= Tomigusuku Seizoku =

Ryukyuan bureaucrat (1520–1622)

- 豊見城 盛続

sanshikan of Ryukyu
- In office 1614–1622
- Preceded by: Nago Ryōhō
- Succeeded by: Kunigami Chōchi

Personal details
- Born: 1560
- Died: May 28, 1622 (aged 61–62)
- Parent: Tomigusuku Seishō (father)
- Chinese name: Mō Keiso (毛 継祖)
- Rank: Ueekata

Tomigusuku Ueekata Seizoku (豊見城 親方 盛続; 1560 – 28 May 1622), also known by his Chinese style name Mō Keiso (毛 継祖), was a bureaucrat of the Ryukyu Kingdom.

Tomigusuku Seizoku was born to the aristocratic Mō-uji Tomigusuku Dunchi (毛氏豊見城殿内) family. He was the eldest son of Tomigusuku Seishō (豊見城 盛章, also known as Mō Ryūbun 毛 龍文), whom served as a member of the Sanshikan during Shō Ei and Shō Nei's reign.

Seizoku put down the rebellion of the Jana family (謝名一族) together with two generals, Ikegusuku Anrai and Mabuni Ankō (摩文仁 安恒, also known as Kin Ōku 金 応煦). All of them received ueekata, the highest rank in the yukatchu aristocracy of Ryukyu.

Ming China sent a mission for the investiture of King Shō Nei in 1606. Concerned about the rampant wakō pirates, King Shō Nei dispatched an army led by Seizoku to defend Nakijin Castle.

Satsuma Domain invaded Ryukyu in the spring of 1609. When Satsuma troops approached Naha, Gushichan Chōsei led a mission to hold peace talks at Oyamise (親見世). Tomigusuku Seizoku, Kikuin, Kian, Ikegusuku Anrai, Esu Seishō (江洲 盛韶) and Tsuken Seisoku (津堅 盛則) were sent as assistants. Neither Kabayama Hisataka nor Hirata Masumune appeared at the peace talk, and the peace proposal was rejected by Satsuma.

Later, Tomigusuku Seizoku and Jana Ueekata oversaw the defense of Yarazamori Castle and Mie Castle in Naha harbor respectively, and repelled an initial Japanese landing there. However, the Satsuma navy landed at nearby Makiminato and seized Naha port after the king surrendered. Seizoku had to retreat to Shuri. His house was burned by Satsuma troops during the siege of Shuri.

After the surrender of king Shō Nei, Seizoku was left in Ryukyu to control Shuri Castle under the watch of Satsuma bugyō together with Nago Ryōhō and Mabuni Ankō, while the king and a number of other officials were brought to Kagoshima, the capital of Satsuma Domain.

Seizoku served as a member of Sanshikan from 1614 to 1622.

Tomigusuku Seizoku
| Preceded by Tomigusuku Seishō | Head of Mō-uji Tomigusuku Dunchi | Succeeded by Tomigusuku Seiryō |
Political offices
| Preceded by Nago Ryōhō | Sanshikan of Ryukyu; 1614 - 1622 | Succeeded by Kunigami Chōchi |
