= Mabuni Ankō =

Mabuni Ankō 摩文仁 親方 安恒
- Born: Mabuni Ueekata Ankō
- Occupation: Bureaucrat of Ryukyu Kingdom

Mabuni Ueekata Ankō (摩文仁 親方 安恒), also known by his Chinese style name Kin Ōku (金 応煦), was a bureaucrat of the Ryukyu Kingdom.

Mabuni Ankō was the eldest son of Gushichan Nōan (具志頭 能安, also known as Kin Kokutei 金 国鼎), the originator of Uezu clan (上江洲家). Nōan married with a sister of Aragusuku Anki, and they had four sons and two daughters; the third son Gushichan Anchi (具志頭 安之, also known as Kin Ōshō 金 応照) later became a member of Sanshikan; and the eldest daughter Mae-agari no Aji (前東之按司), was the queen of King Shō Ei.

The Jana family (謝名一族) launched a rebellion against the king in 1592. Mabuni was appointed as general together with Ikegusuku Anrai and Kochinda Higa Seizoku (東風平比嘉 盛続). They used fire attack and put down the rebellion successfully. All of them received ueekata, the highest rank in the yukatchu aristocracy of Ryukyu.

In the spring of 1609, Satsuma invaded Ryukyu and sieged the Shuri Castle. The women all were frightened of Japanese ashigaru, they ran away hiding in the mountains. There were no rest food in the castle, Mabuni sent his men into the mountains, hunted for food and sent into the castle.

Unlike many residences that were ransacked and burned by Japanese ashigaru, his house survived. Shimazu Iehisa sent samurai to guard the gate of his residence, and strictly ordered his forces not to disturb his family.

After the surrender of king Shō Nei, Mabuni was left in Ryukyu to control Shuri Castle under the watch of Satsuma bugyo together with Nago Ryōhō and Tomigusuku Seizoku, while the king and a number of other officials were brought to Kagoshima, the capital of Satsuma Domain.
