= Ankon =

Ankon may refer to:

- Ankon (Picenum), an ancient Greek colony, now Ancona in Italy
- Ankon (Pontus), an ancient settlement of Pontus, now in Turkey
- Ankon (surname)
  - Mahidul Islam Ankon (born 1999), Bangladeshi cricketer
  - Ikegusuku Ankon (1768–?), Ryukyuan bureaucrat
