= Zakimi Seifu =

Ryukyuan bureaucrat (1801–1859)

- 座喜味 盛普

sanshikan of Ryukyu
- In office 1847–1858
- Preceded by: Oroku Ryōkyō
- Succeeded by: Fukuyama Chōten

Personal details
- Born: December 20, 1801
- Died: April 21, 1859 (aged 57)
- Parent: Zakimi Seichin (father)
- Chinese name: Mō Tatsutoku (毛 達徳), later Mō Kōtoku (毛 恒徳)
- Rank: Ueekata

Zakimi Ueekata Seifu (座喜味 親方 盛普; 20 December 1801 – 21 April 1859), was a bureaucrat of the Ryukyu Kingdom. His Chinese style name (唐名, Karana) was Mō Tatsutoku (毛 達徳), later changed to Mō Kōtoku (毛 恒徳).

Zakimi Seifu was born to an aristocrat family called Mō-uji Zakimi Dunchi (毛氏座喜味殿内). He was the 11th head of this family, and his father Zakimi Seichin, was a Sanshikan during Shō Kō's reign.

King Shō Iku dispatched Prince Urasoe Chōki (浦添 朝憙, also known as Shō Genro 尚 元魯) and him in 1839 to celebrate Tokugawa Ieyoshi succeeded as shōgun of the Tokugawa shogunate. They sailed back in the next year.

Zakimi Seifu was selected as a member of Sanshikan in 1847. In 1857, Makishi Chōchū, who was a member of omote jūgonin (表十五人; "The fifteen magistrates"), planned to act as an intermediary for buying warship from France at Shimazu Nariakira's behest. It was strongly apposed by Seifu. He came into conflict with pro-Japanese factions, including Makishi Chōchū, Onga Chōkō and Oroku Ryōchū. He was impeached by Onga and had to resign in 1858. It was needed to elect a new member of Sanshikan to follow him, and the election was held in the next year. Oroku helped Makishi to offer a bribe to two Japanese samurai, Ichiki Shirō and Sonoda Niemon (園田 仁右衛門), in order to let Makishi be elected. However, Seifu heard about this and accused him. Soon Makishi, Onga and Oroku were removed from their positions and arrested. This incident was known as Makishi Onga Incident (牧志恩河事件).

Zakimi Seifu
Preceded by Zakimi Seichin	Head of Mō-uji Zakimi Dunchi	Succeeded by Zakimi Seishō
Political offices
Preceded by Oroku Ryōkyō	Sanshikan of Ryukyu; 1847–1858	Succeeded by Fukuyama Chōten
