= Inoha Seiki =

Ryukyuan bureaucrat (1619–1688)

- 伊野波 盛紀

sanshikan of Ryukyu
- In office 1665–1688
- Preceded by: Kanegusuku Ryōsei
- Succeeded by: Sadoyama Anji

Personal details
- Born: February 15, 1619
- Died: August 2, 1688 (aged 69)
- Children: Inoha Seihei (son); Shikina Seimei (son)
- Parent: Tomigusuku Seiryō (father)
- Chinese name: Mō Taiei (毛 泰永)
- Rank: Ueekata

Inoha Ueekata Seiki (伊野波 親方 盛紀; 15 February 1619 – 2 August 1688), also known by his Chinese style name Mō Taiei (毛 泰永), was a bureaucrat of Ryukyu Kingdom.

Inoha Seiki was the second son of Tomigusuku Seiryō. He served as a member of Sanshikan from 1665 to 1688.

Motobu magiri was established in 1666, and was given to him as a hereditary fief. He was also the first head of an aristocrat family called Mō-uji Inoha Dunchi (毛氏伊野波殿内).

Inoha Seiki
title created	Head of Mō-uji Inoha Dunchi	Succeeded by Inoha Seihei
Political offices
Preceded by Kanegusuku Ryōsei	Sanshikan of Ryukyu; 1665 - 1688	Succeeded by Sadoyama Anji
