= Nago Ryōhō =

Ryukyuan bureaucrat (1551–1617)

- 名護 良豊

sanshikan of Ryukyu
- In office 1592–1614
- Preceded by: Nago Ryōin
- Succeeded by: Tomigusuku Seizoku

Personal details
- Born: 1551
- Died: 1617 (aged 65–66)
- Parent: Nago Ryōin (father)
- Childhood name: 太良金
- Chinese name: Ba Ryōhitsu (馬 良弼)
- Rank: Ueekata

Nago Ueekata Ryōhō (名護 親方 良豊; 1551–1617), also known by the Chinese-style name Ba Ryōhitsu (馬 良弼), was a Ryukyuan aristocrat and bureaucrat in the royal government of the Ryukyu Kingdom.

Nago was born to an aristocrat family called Ba-uji Oroku Dunchi (馬氏小禄殿内), whose ancestor was Yuwan Ufunushi, a tribal chief from Amami Ōshima. Both his father and grandfather been a member of the Sanshikan, the king's closest advisors. In 1579, he went to Ming China to pay tribute together with Jana Ueekata, whom later became his colleague. In 1592, at the age of 41, his father retired, and he became a member of the Sanshikan.

At this time, Japan was unified by the daimyō Toyotomi Hideyoshi. Hideyoshi planned to invade Korea and China, and demanded that the Kingdom supply 10 months' rations for 7,000 troops to aid in his invasions through agents of Satsuma. The court was split between pro-Chinese and pro-Japanese factions; Nago was pro-Japanese, suggested that king Shō Nei should obey, but this suggestion was strongly opposed by his colleague Jana. Jana suggested that all the demands should be rejected. However, both of their advice was not accepted by king Shō Nei; the king sent a warning to China in 1591, and sent only half of the demanded supplies in 1593.

Following Hideyoshi's death and after Tokugawa Ieyasu came to power, king Shō Nei was ordered by Satsuma to pay tribute to the Tokugawa shogunate, the newly established government. Shō Nei ignored the demand, largely upon the advice of Jana Ueekata. In 1609, Ryukyu was invaded by Satsuma, in response to this and other refusals of Japanese demands on the part of the Kingdom. The war broke out on April 8, 1609; less than a month later, Satsuma troops landed on the Motobu Peninsula on northern Okinawa Island. Nago Ryōhō was sent by the king to reinforce Nakijin Castle, leading a force of a thousand soldiers. On April 30, Nago met the samurai at Nakijin, but lost half his force and was captured.

Nago was brought to Naha harbor by the Japanese. After the surrender of king Shō Nei, Nago was released to control Shuri Castle, the capital of Ryukyu, under the watch of Satsuma bugyō while the king and a number of other officials were brought to Kagoshima, the capital of Satsuma Domain. Two years after the invasion, the king returned to Ryukyu, and Nago remained in his position. Nago retired in 1614, and died three years later.

Nago Ryōhō
Preceded by Nago Ryōin	Head of Ba-uji Oroku Dunchi; 1592–1617	Succeeded by Nago Ryōeki
Political offices
Preceded by Nago Ryōin	Sanshikan of Ryukyu; 1592–1614	Succeeded by Tomigusuku Seizoku
