= Shikina Seimei =

Ryukyuan bureaucrat (1652–1715)

- 識名 盛命

sanshikan of Ryukyu
- In office 1702–1712
- Preceded by: Nakada Chōjū
- Succeeded by: Ishadō Seifu

Personal details
- Born: January 29, 1652
- Died: November 18, 1715 (aged 63)
- Parent: Inoha Seiki (father)
- Chinese name: Mō Kiryū (毛 起龍)
- Rank: Ueekata

Shikina Ueekata Seimei (識名 親方 盛命; 29 January 1652 – 18 November 1715), also known by his Chinese style name Mō Kiryū (毛 起龍), was a bureaucrat, politician and scholar of Japanese literature of the Ryukyu Kingdom.

Shikina was born to an aristocrat family called Mō-uji Inoha Dunchi (毛氏伊野波殿内). He was the third son of Inoha Seiki, and also a younger brother of Inoha Seihei (also known as Mōi Ueekata). Both Seiki and Seihei had been served as Sanshikan, and Shikina Seimei himself served as a member of Sanshikan from 1702 to 1712. In his term, he was assigned to take charge of collecting Omoro Sōshi (1710), and compiling Konkōkenshū (混効験集) (1711), the first dictionary of the Okinawan language in history.

Shikina was also the writer of Omoidegusa (思出草), a poetic diary written in Japanese.

Political offices
Preceded by Nakada Chōjū	Sanshikan of Ryukyu; 1702 - 1712	Succeeded by Ishadō Seifu
