= Tajima Chōyū =

Ryukyuan bureaucrat (1655–1737)

- 田島 朝由

sanshikan of Ryukyu
- In office 1710–1716
- Preceded by: Kōchi Ryōshō
- Succeeded by: Katsuren Seiyū

Personal details
- Born: May 17, 1655
- Died: August 9, 1737 (aged 82)
- Parent: Okuma Chōjū (father)
- Chinese name: Shō Genryō (向 元良)
- Rank: Ueekata

Tajima Ueekata Chōyū (田島 親方 朝由; 17 May 1655 – 9 August 1737), also known by his Chinese style name Shō Genryō (向 元良), was a bureaucrat of the Ryukyu Kingdom.

He was the eldest son of Okuma Chōjū (奥間 朝充), and was also a grandson of Urasoe Chōshi. In 1703, King Shō Tei established the Kyūkiza (旧記座, "Bureau of Old Records") in order to compiled an official chorography of Ryukyu Kingdom. Tajima was appointed as the first Kyūki bugyō (旧記奉行), the magistrate of this bureau. He compiled the earliest and most voluminous regional gazetteer, Ryūkyū-koku yurai-ki, and dedicated it to King Shō Kei in 1713.

Tajima served as a member of Sanshikan from 1710 to 1716.

Political offices
Preceded by Kōchi Ryōshō	Sanshikan of Ryukyu; 1710 - 1716	Succeeded by Katsuren Seiyū
