= Anki (disambiguation) =

Anki is a free and open-source flashcard program.

Anki may also refer to:

- Anki (American company), an American robotics and artificial intelligence startup
- Anki (Finnish company), a Finnish manufacturer of rugs
- Anxi County (安溪县) (Anki), Quanzhou, Fujian, People's Republic of China
- Ikegusuku Anki (1829–1877), a Ryukyuan bureaucrat
