= Kunigami Seijun =

Ryukyuan bureaucrat (1511–1580)

Kunigami Ueekata Seijun (国頭 親方 盛順; 1511 – 14 April 1580), also known by his Chinese style name Ō Jushō (翁 寿祥), was a bureaucrat of the Ryukyu Kingdom.

There were few details about his parents and family background even they were not recorded in his genealogy book. Kunigami was a son-in-law of Urasoe Ryōken. He was appointed ishi bugyō (石奉行, "Magistrate of stone") in 1554. He served as Sanshikan during King Shō Gen's reign.

He was dispatched as congratulatory envoy together with Ryō Gen (梁炫) to celebrate the Longqing Emperor's coronation in 1568, and sailed back two years later.

Kunigami Seijun was the originator of Ō-uji Nagayama Dunchi (翁氏永山殿内), which was one of the "Five Aristocratic Families" (五大名門) in Ryukyuan history.

Kunigami Seijun
title created	Head of Ō-uji Nagayama Dunchi ? － 1580	Succeeded by Gusukuma Seikyū
