= Misato Anman =

Ryukyuan bureaucrat (1669–1744)

- 美里 安満

sanshikan of Ryukyu
- In office 1725–1735
- Preceded by: Mabuni Ansei
- Succeeded by: Shikina Chōei

Personal details
- Born: April 19, 1669
- Died: September 4, 1744 (aged 75)
- Parent: Takehara An'i (father)
- Chinese name: Mō Heijin (毛 秉仁)
- Rank: Ueekata

Misato Ueekata Anman (美里 親方 安満; 19 April 1669 – 4 September 1744), also known by his Chinese style name Mō Heijin (毛 秉仁), was a politician and bureaucrat of the Ryukyu Kingdom.

Misato Anman was born to an aristocrat family called Mō-uji Misato Dunchi (毛氏美里殿内). He was the eldest son of Takehara An'i.

Misato was elected as Sanshikan in 1725. Toyokawa Seiei (豊川 正英) wrote Gokyōjō (御教条) based on Liuyu Yanyi (六諭衍義) at Sai On's behest in order to regulate moral behavior with Chinese Confucianism. It was identified as textbook by law in 1732. The law was jointly signed by Misato, Sai On, Ie Chōjo, all were members of Sanshikan, and later the sessei Chatan Chōki. But it was strongly resisted by pro-Japanese faction, including Heshikiya Chōbin and one of Misato's younger brother Tomoyose Anjō (友寄 安乗). They composed a letter in 1734 to Zaibanbukyō (在番奉行), the judicial offices of Japan's Satsuma Domain which set up in Ryukyu Kingdom, criticizing the kingdom's government, in particular royal advisor Sai On, who was accused of being pro-Chinese. But the letter was handed over to the king. Both Heshikiya and Tomoyose were executed by crucifixion, and their offspring were exiled. This incident was known as Heshikiya Tomoyose Incident (平敷屋友寄事件).

Misato was not implicated in this incident and his descendants survived. He retired in the next year.

Political offices
Preceded by Mabuni Ansei	Sanshikan of Ryukyu; 1725 - 1735	Succeeded by Shikina Chōei
