= Oroku Ryōchū =

19th-century Ryukyuan bureaucrat

- 小禄 良忠

sanshikan of Ryukyu
- In office 1857–1859
- Preceded by: Kōchi Chōken
- Succeeded by: Yonabaru Ryōkyō

Personal details
- Born: 27 June 1819 Ryukyu Kingdom
- Died: Unknown
- Parent: Oroku Ryōkyō (father)
- Chinese name: Ba Kokushō (馬 克承)
- Rank: Ueekata

Oroku Ueekata Ryōchū (小禄 親方 良忠; b. 27 June 1819), also known by the Chinese-style name Ba Kokushō (馬 克承), was a bureaucrat of the Ryukyu Kingdom.

Ryōchū was born to an aristocrat family called Ba-uji Oroku Dunchi (馬氏小禄殿内). He was the 12th head of Oroku Dunchi, and his father Oroku Ryōkyō, was a Sanshikan during Shō Iku's reign.

Oroku Ryōchū was selected as a member of Sanshikan in 1857. He was pro-Japanese, and was a political ally of Makishi Chōchū and Onga Chōkō (恩河 朝恒, also known as Shō Jorin 向 汝霖). The election of Sanshikan would be held in 1859, Oroku helped Makishi Chōchū to offer a bribe to two Japanese samurai, Ichiki Shirō and Sonoda Niemon (園田 仁右衛門), in order to let Makishi be elected. However, Zakimi Seifu, a former Sanshikan who was impeached by Onga Chōkō and had to resign before, accused Makishi Chōchū of practice bribery at election. Soon Oroku's unlawful act was exposed, he was removed from his position and arrested together with Makishi Chōchū and Onga Chōkō. Prince Ie was appointed as judge to interrogate them. Oroku denied all the allegations but Makishi pleaded guilty. Oroku was exiled to Ie Island and imprisoned at a temple for 500 days, while Makishi was sentenced to exile to Yaeyama for ten years and Onga to Kume Island for six years, respectively. This incident was known as Makishi Onga Incident (牧志恩河事件).

Oroku Ryōchū
Preceded by Oroku Ryōkyō	Head of Ba-uji Oroku Dunchi	Succeeded by Oroku Ryōkyū
Political offices
Preceded by Kōchi Chōken	Sanshikan of Ryukyu; 1857–1859	Succeeded by Yonabaru Ryōkyō
