= Ikegusuku An'i =

Ryukyuan bureaucrat (1669–1710)

- 池城 安倚

sanshikan of Ryukyu
- In office 1699–1710
- Preceded by: Takehara An'i
- Succeeded by: Nago Ryōi

Personal details
- Born: October 16, 1669
- Died: August 12, 1710 (aged 40)
- Chinese name: Mō Tenshō (毛 天相)
- Rank: Ueekata

Ikegusuku Ueekata An'i (池城 親方 安倚; 16 October 1669 – 12 August 1710), also known by his Chinese style name Mō Tenshō (毛 天相), was a bureaucrat of Ryukyu Kingdom.

An'i was the eighth head of an aristocrat family, Mō-uji Ikegusuku Dunchi (毛氏池城殿内). He was a grandson of Ikegusuku Anken.

An'i was dispatched to China to pay tribute together with Tei Kōryō (鄭 弘良) and Tei Junsoku in 1696. He went to Satsuma to report this in 1698. He served as a member of sanshikan from 1699 to 1710.

He was good at waka poetry.

Ikegusuku An'i
| Preceded by Noza Ansen | Head of Mō-uji Ikegusuku Dunchi | Succeeded by Ikegusuku Anhon |
Political offices
| Preceded by Takehara An'i | Sanshikan of Ryukyu; 1699 - 1710 | Succeeded by Nago Ryōi |
