= Takehara An'i =

Ryukyuan bureaucrat (1651–1697)

- 嵩原 安依

sanshikan of Ryukyu
- In office 1690–1697
- Preceded by: Ikegusuku Anken
- Succeeded by: Ikegusuku An'i

Personal details
- Born: February 27, 1651
- Died: October 27, 1697 (aged 46)
- Parent: Aragusuku Anjū (father)
- Chinese name: Mō Kenryū (毛 見龍)
- Rank: Ueekata

Takehara Ueekata An'i (嵩原 親方 安依; 27 February 1651 – 27 October 1697), also known by his Chinese style name Mō Kenryū (毛 見龍), was a bureaucrat of Ryukyu Kingdom.

Takehara was a descendant of Aragusuku Anki. He was the third son of Aragusuku Anjū (新城 安充), and was the originator of an aristocrat family, Mō-uji Misato Dunchi (毛氏美里殿内).

Takehara served as a member of sanshikan from 1690 to 1697. He was appointed Kumejima kensha (久米島検者, "investigator of Kume Island") and sent to Kume Island in 1690, there he promulgated the memorandum, Kume-jima Kibochō (久米島規模帳). He was granted Misato magiri (美里間切, modern part of Okinawa, Okinawa) as his hereditary fief in 1697.

Takehara was a son-in-law of King Shō Shitsu. He had two famous sons: the eldest son Misato Anman and the third son Tomoyose Anjō (友寄 安乗). One later became a member of sanshikan; the other plotted to overthrow Sai On together with Heshikiya Chōbin, and was executed by crucifixion.

Takehara An'i
title created	Head of Mō-uji Misato Dunchi	Succeeded by Misato Anman
Political offices
Preceded by Ikegusuku Anken	Sanshikan of Ryukyu; 1690 - 1697	Succeeded by Ikegusuku An'i
