= Gusukuma =

Gusukuma (Okinawan:Gushikuma) is a Ryukyuan surname that may refer to the following notable people:

- Gusukuma Seihō (1614–1644), Japanese royal court painter of the Ryūkyū Kingdom
- Gusukuma Seikyū (1542–1612), Japanese bureaucrat of the Ryukyu Kingdom
- Gusukuma Shūshin (1507–1585), Japanese bureaucrat of the Ryukyu Kingdom
- Shinpan Gusukuma (1890–1954), Okinawan martial artist
