= Kunigami Seikaku =

Ryukyuan bureaucrat (died 1571)

Kunigami Ueekata Seikaku (国頭 親方 正格; ? – 1571), also known by his Chinese style name Ba Juntoku (馬 順徳), was a bureaucrat of the Ryukyu Kingdom.

Seikaku was the eldest son of Kunigami Seikan (国頭 正鑑), and was also a grandson of Kunigami Seiin (国頭 正胤). He served as Sanshikan during King Shō Gen's reign.

Amami Ōshima revolted and refused to pay tribute in 1571. Troops led by King Shō Gen went to suppress them, but the king got sick seriously on the way. Seikaku prayed to heaven and said that he would like to replace the king to die. Magically, the king fully recovered and quickly put down the rebellion, but Seikaku died. The king was moved, promoted his son Kunigami Seichi to the rank of Aji, and established the aristocrat family of Kunigami Udun. This was the only Aji family with no royal blood, and Kunigami Seikaku was regarded posthumously as the third head of this Kunigami Udun.

Kunigami Seikaku
Preceded by Kunigami Seikan	head of Kunigami Udun	Succeeded by Kunigami Seichi
