= Kunigami Seiin =

Ryukyuan bureaucrat (died 1537)

Kunigami Ueekata Seiin (国頭 親方 正胤; ? – 1537), also known by his Chinese style name Ba Shiryō (馬 思良), was a bureaucrat of the Ryukyu Kingdom.

Kunigami Seiin was the second son of Okuma Kanjaa (奥間カンジャー), a blacksmith who lived in Okuma, Kunigami. Kanamaru fled to Okuma and hid in the mountain. Okuma Kanjaa found him and saved him from starving to death.

Later, Kanamaru ascended the throne and changed his name to King Shō En. As a reward for saving his life, Shō En elevated Kunigami Seiin to the peerage, gave Seiin Kunigami magiri (modern Kunigami, Okinawa) as the hereditary fief.

Kunigami Seiin served as Sanshikan during King Shō Shin and Shō Sei's reign. He was the grandfather of Kunigami Seikaku. Later, Seiin was regarded as the first head of Kunigami Udun (国頭御殿) posthumously.

Kunigami Seiin
title created	head of Kunigami Udun	Succeeded by Kunigami Seikan
