= Ikegusuku Antō =

Ryukyuan bureaucrat (died 1579)

Ikegusuku Antō Ueekata
- 池城 安棟
- Disappeared: 1579; East China Sea
- Known for: Bureaucrat of Ryukyu Kingdom

Ikegusuku Ueekata Antō (池城 親方 安棟; 1??? – 1579), also known by his Chinese style name Mō Ren (毛 廉), was a bureaucrat of the Ryukyu Kingdom.

== Biography ==
Ikegusuku Antō was the second head of an aristocrat family called Mō-uji Ikegusuku Dunchi (毛氏池城殿内). His father was Aragusuku Anki.

Antō served as a member of Sanshikan during Shō Gen and Shō Ei's reign. He was dispatched as congratulatory envoy to Ming China together with Sai Chōki (蔡 朝器) to celebrate the investiture of Crown Prince Zhu Yijun (later Wanli Emperor) in 1569.

== Disappearance ==
In 1579, Chinese envoys would come to Ryukyu to install Shō Ei as the new king. But Ryukyu was suffering from famine in this year. Antō was sent to China to ask for postponement, but his ship was caught in a storm and disappeared in the sea and was never seen again.

== See also ==
- List of people who disappeared mysteriously at sea

Ikegusuku Antō
Preceded by Aragusuku Anki	Head of Mō-uji Ikegusuku Dunchi	Succeeded by Ikegusuku Anrai
