= Tomikawa =

Tomikawa may refer to:

- Tomikawa Station, a railway station in Hokkaido, Japan

== People with the surname ==
- Tomikawa Seikei (1832–1890), politician and bureaucrat of the Ryukyu Kingdom
- Sumio Tomikawa (1941–?), Japanese actor who played the role of George Kirishima in Robot Detective
- Moritake Tomikawa (born 1948), Japanese economist and civil servant, acting governor of Okinawa Prefecture in 2018
- Harumi Tomikawa (born 1969), member of disbanded idol group Onyanko Club
