= Takehara Anshitsu =

Ryukyuan bureaucrat (1756–1811)

- 嵩原 安執

sanshikan of Ryukyu
- In office 1798–1811
- Preceded by: Kōchi Ryōtoku
- Succeeded by: Oroku Ryōwa

Personal details
- Born: January 31, 1756
- Died: June 28, 1811 (aged 55)
- Parent: Takehara Anshun (father)
- Chinese name: Mō Kokutō (毛 国棟)
- Rank: Ueekata

Takehara Ueekata Anshitsu (嵩原 親方 安執; 31 January 1756 – 28 June 1811), also known by his Chinese style name Mō Kokutō (毛 国棟), was a bureaucrat of Ryukyu Kingdom.

Takehara Anshitsu was born to an aristocrat family called Mō-uji Misato Dunchi (毛氏美里殿内). He was the eldest son of Takehara Anshun (嵩原 安春). He succeeded as the head of Mō-shi Misato Dunchi in 1792, and was given Misato magiri (modern a part of Uruma), which was the hereditary fief of his family in the same year.

He served as a member of Sanshikan from 1798 to 1811.

Political offices
Preceded by Kōchi Ryōtoku	Sanshikan of Ryukyu; 1798 - 1811	Succeeded by Oroku Ryōwa
