= Wakugawa Chōkyō =

Ryukyuan bureaucrat (1712–1785)

- 湧川 朝喬

sanshikan of Ryukyu
- In office 1765–1778
- Preceded by: Kochinda Chōei
- Succeeded by: Fukuyama Chōki

Personal details
- Born: March 24, 1712
- Died: April 16, 1785 (aged 73)
- Chinese name: Shō Hōten (向 邦鼎)
- Rank: Ueekata

Wakugawa Ueekata Chōkyō (湧川 親方 朝喬; 24 March 1712 – 16 April 1785) also known by his Chinese style name Shō Hōten (向 邦鼎), was a bureaucrat of Ryukyu Kingdom.

Wakugawa was born to an aristocrat family called Shō-uji Wakugawa Dunchi (向氏湧川殿内); later, he became the eleventh head of this family, and was given Goeku magiri (越来間切, modern part of Okinawa, Okinawa) as a hereditary fief. He was also a descendant of King Shō Sen'i.

Wakugawa was dispatched together with Prince Yuntanza Chōkō (also known by Yuntanza Chōken) in 1764 to celebrate Tokugawa Ieharu succeeded as shōgun of the Tokugawa shogunate. They sailed back in the next year.

He served as a member of sanshikan from 1765 to 1778. He put forward a proposal for the first statutory law in Ryukyuan history, together with his two colleagues, Miyahira Ryōtei and Yonabaru Ryōku, and the sessei Yuntanza Chōkō in 1775. This proposal was approved by King Shō Boku. The law was completed in 1786.

Wakugawa Chōkyō
Preceded by Wakugawa Chōryaku	Head of Shō-uji Wakugawa Dunchi	Succeeded by Wakugawa Chōkō
Political offices
Preceded by Kochinda Chōei	Sanshikan of Ryukyu; 1765–1778	Succeeded by Fukuyama Chōki
