= Takushi Seiri =

Ryukyuan bureaucrat (died 1526)

Takushi Ueekata Seiri (沢岻 親方 盛里; ? – 24 September 1526), also known by the Chinese style name (唐名, Kara-naa) Mō Bunei (毛 文英) and childhood name (童名, warabi-naa) Tatsurokane (達魯加禰), was a bureaucrat of the Ryukyu Kingdom. In some poems of Omoro Sōshi, he was mentioned and called Takushi Tarō (沢岻 太郎).

Takushi Seiri was the third son of Tomigusuku Seishin (豊見城 盛親), so he was a grandson of Gosamaru. He was also the first head of an aristocrat family called Mō-uji Uesato Dunchi (毛氏上里殿内).

Takushi served as Sanshikan during Shō Shin and Shō Sei's reign, and was trusted by the kings very much. He was dispatched as congratulatory envoy to Ming China to celebrate Jiajing Emperor's coronation in 1522. He bought a litter and a tap in China, and brought them back to Ryukyu in the next year. He dedicated the litter to King Shō Shin, and fixed the tap in Ryūtoi (龍樋, "dragon rain gutter"), a spring near Zuisen gate (瑞泉門) in Shuri Castle.
