= Giwan Chōho =

Ryukyuan bureaucrat (1823–1876)

- 宜湾 朝保
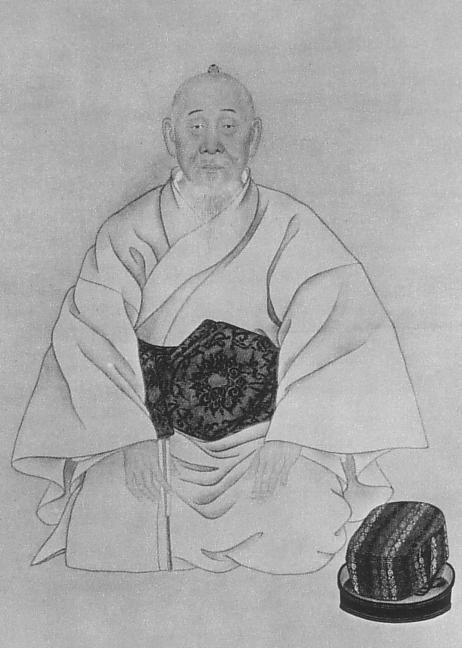

sanshikan of Ryukyu
- In office 1862–1875
- Preceded by: Ikegusuku Anyū
- Succeeded by: Tomikawa Seikei

Personal details
- Born: April 15, 1823
- Died: September 23, 1876 (aged 53)
- Parent: Ginowan Chōkon (father)
- Chinese name: Shō Yūkō (向 有恒)
- Rank: Ueekata

Shō Yūkō Ginowan ueekata Chōho (向有恒 宜湾 親方 朝保; 1823–1876), also known more simply as Giwan Chōho (宜湾 朝保), was a Ryukyuan government official and emissary; at the time of the Meiji Restoration in Japan, he was a member of the Sanshikan, the Council of Three top government ministers in the Ryūkyū Kingdom.

Giwan was the representative of the kingdom tasked, in 1872, with conveying to the king & his fellow ministers the imperial government's orders that the kingdom be abolished, and its territory annexed by Japan.

He is also known for his waka poetry.

== Life and career ==
Giwan was born in Shuri to an aristocratic family, and inherited from his father Ginowan magiri as his domain, along with the title of Ginowan ueekata (宜野湾親方; "Lord of Ginowan") in 1835. He would have his title changed to "Giwan ueekata" in 1875 when the king's second son Shō In was named "Prince of Ginowan" (宜野湾王子, Ginowan Ōji).

He served many years in the bureaucracy, and was dispatched on missions to China and Japan on a number of occasions. He became a member of the Sanshikan in 1862, and on account of his experience, continued to lead missions overseas.

The Tokugawa shogunate fell in Japan in 1868, to be replaced by a new Imperial government. Three years later, an incident in which a number of Okinawans, shipwrecked on Taiwan, were killed by natives there developed into disputes between the Japanese Imperial government and that of Qing Dynasty China over sovereignty or suzerainty over Okinawa. After discussions in the Okinawan royal capital of Shuri with Japanese representatives of Satsuma Domain, the Japanese government summoned King Shō Tai to Tokyo to further discuss the political status of the Ryūkyū Kingdom vis-a-vis Japan. So as to not imply his subordination to the Meiji Emperor by appearing before him himself, Shō Tai feigned illness and sent a mission on his behalf, led by his uncle Prince Ie, and by Giwan Chōho.

The mission was also to serve to officially present congratulations from the kingdom on the occasion of the birth of the new Imperial Japanese government. Similar missions had journeyed to Edo in the past, on the occasion of the accession of a new shōgun. As had occurred on the occasions of such previous missions, Giwan and his party presented a number of gifts to the Japanese, and were well received and well-treated. The ambassadors took part in a variety of activities organized by the Ministry of Foreign Affairs, including meeting with Ainu chiefs and attending the opening of the first railway in Japan.

On October 14, 1872, the ambassadors were presented with an imperial decree, stating that the Ryūkyū Kingdom was to become Ryukyu Domain, a province within the Japanese nation, with Shō Tai as governor. While this brought to an end the identity of the kingdom as an independent (or semi-independent) foreign nation, and the absorption of the islands into the Japanese state, it also meant an end to over 250 years of the kingdom's subordination to Satsuma.

Giwan and his party returned to Okinawa with this news, and a new mission was sent presently to Tokyo to work out details of this new political arrangement, while Giwan remained at Shuri.

For a brief time, it seemed that Ryukyu was to enjoy a newfound degree of self-rule, with Shō Tai serving as governor of the domain. Though the system of han, or feudal domains, had been abolished even before Ryukyu Domain was established, the system of prefectures had yet to be put into place. Thus, for this brief time, Shō Tai was Governor of Ryukyu, and not Lord or daimyō as the rulers of the han were up until then.

However, several years later, in 1875, Giwan, along with a number of other government ministers and royals, received a mission led by Matsuda Michiyuki, Chief Secretary of the Home Ministry. Matsuda oversaw the implementation of a number of wide-ranging political changes and other systematic changes concordant with the incorporation of Ryukyu into Japan, including the establishment of a permanent military garrison in the Ryukyus. Giwan came under attack, as did all officials who had negotiated with the Japanese or accepted their terms, and was forced to resign from public office.

He retired to the countryside, and died the following year.

Giwan Chōho
Preceded by Ginowan Chōkon	Head of Shō-uji Giwan Dunchi; 1836 － 1876	Succeeded by Ginowan Chōhō
Political offices
Preceded by Ikegusuku Anyū	Sanshikan of Ryukyu; 1862 - 1875	Succeeded by Tomikawa Seikei
