= Kamegawa Seibu =

Ryukyuan bureaucrat (1808–1880)

- 亀川 盛武
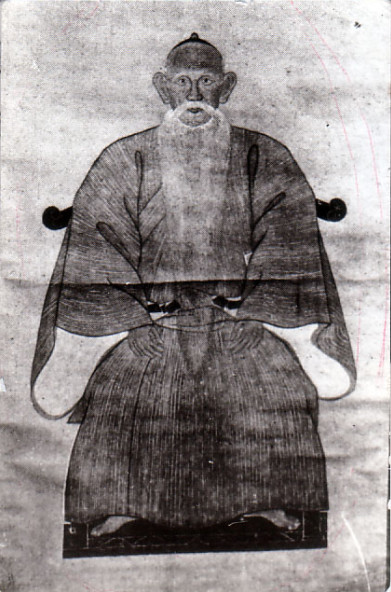

sanshikan of Ryukyu
- In office 1871–1872
- Preceded by: Yonabaru Ryōkyō
- Succeeded by: Urasoe Chōshō

Personal details
- Born: 1808 Ryukyu Kingdom
- Died: 13 November 1880 (aged 71–72) Shuri, Okinawa, Empire of Japan
- Chinese name: Mō Inryō (毛 允良)
- Rank: Ueekata

Kamegawa Ueekata Seibu (亀川 親方 盛武; 1808 – 13 November 1880), also known by the Chinese-style name Mō Inryō (毛 允良), was a politician and bureaucrat of Ryukyu Kingdom.

Kamegawa was selected as a member of the Sanshikan in 1871, but was forced to retire by Japan in the next year because he was strongly pro-Chinese.

After Ryukyu was annexed by Japan in 1879, Kamegawa Seibu became the chief leader of anti-Japanese factions. He sent his grandson Kamegawa Seitō (亀川 盛棟, also known as Mō Yūkei 毛 有慶) to Fuzhou to request China negotiate it with Japan. In the next year, Seitō came back to Shuri and spread rumors that Chinese troops would come to liberate Ryukyu soon. The Kamegawa family was arrested by police, and tortured in the prison. Seibu was released on 3 November, but died ten days later.

Political offices
Preceded by Yonabaru Ryōkyō	Sanshikan of Ryukyu; 1871 - 1872	Succeeded by Urasoe Chōshō
