= Urasoe Chōshi =

Ryukyuan bureaucrat (1558–1620)

- 浦添 朝師

sanshikan of Ryukyu
- In office ?–1611
- Preceded by: ?
- Succeeded by: Ikegusuku Anrai

Personal details
- Born: 1558
- Died: 1620 (aged 61–62)
- Children: Kunigami Chōchi (son); Urasoe Chōri (son)
- Parent: Urasoe Chōkyō (father)
- Chinese name: Shō Ritan (向 里端), or Shō Rizui (向 里瑞)
- Rank: Ueekata

Urasoe Ueekata Chōshi (浦添 親方 朝師; 1558 – 1620) was a politician and bureaucrat of the Ryukyu Kingdom. He was also known by his Chinese style name Shō Ritan (向 里端) or Shō Rizui (向 里瑞).

Urasoe Chōshi was the sixth son of Prince Urasoe Chōkyō (浦添 朝喬). He was also an uncle of King Shō Nei. After Shō Nei ascended to the throne, he became a member of the Sanshikan. He was pro-Chinese and supported his colleague Jana Ueekata. In the spring of 1609, Satsuma invaded Ryukyu and besieged Shuri Castle. Chōshi's three sons, Makaru (真かる), Mayamado (真大和) and Momochiyo (百千代), were killed in the battle.

After King Shō Nei's surrender, Chōshi was taken to Kagoshima together with King Shō Nei and a number of high officials by Satsuma troops. King Shō Nei was released and went back to Ryukyu together with many ministers in 1611, except for two pro-Chinese high ministers: Urasoe Chōshi and Jana Ueekata Rizan. Chōshi was held as hostage, and Rizan was executed. Chōshi was removed from his position and remained in Satsuma until 1616. He died in Shuri at the age of 61.

Political offices
Preceded by ?	Sanshikan of Ryukyu ? - 1611	Succeeded by Ikegusuku Anrai
