= Naha Port Facility =

United States Forces Japan facility in Naha, Okinawa, Japan

Coordinates: 26°12′30″N 127°40′00″E

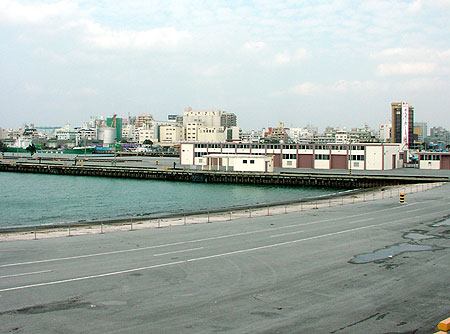
LST ramp

The Naha Port Facility, formerly the Naha Military Port, is a United States Forces Japan facility located in Naha, Okinawa, Japan, at the mouth of Kokuba River (国場川, Kokuba-gawa), which flows into the East China Sea.

The Naha Military Port was constructed by the U.S. troops after their landing on Okinawa Island in 1945. In 1950, Yarazamori Castle was demolished to make room for the port facility. It served as a logistic base during the Vietnam War. After the reversion of Okinawa from the United States to Japan in 1972, return of the land to the government of Japan was agreed at the 15th U.S.-Japan Security Consultative Committee held in 1974. A part of the land has been returned and the remaining land will be returned after the completion of planned move of the facility to Urasoe, Okinawa.

== See also ==
- Naval Base Okinawa
