= Ikegusuku Anrai =

Ryukyuan bureaucrat (1558–1623)

- 池城 安頼

sanshikan of Ryukyu
- In office 1611–1623
- Preceded by: Urasoe Chōshi
- Succeeded by: Gushichan Anshi

Personal details
- Born: 1558 Ryukyu Kingdom
- Died: 1 February 1623 (aged 64–65) Jiangnan, Ming China
- Parent: Ikegusuku Antō (father)
- Chinese name: Mō Hōgi (毛 鳳儀)
- Rank: Ueekata

Ikegusuku Ueekata Anrai (池城 親方 安頼; 1558 – 1 February 1623), also known by his Chinese style name Mō Hōgi (毛 鳳儀), was a bureaucrat of the Ryukyu Kingdom.

Ikegusuku Anrai was the third head of an aristocrat family called Mō-uji Ikegusuku Dunchi (毛氏池城殿内). His father Ikegusuku Antō (池城 安棟), was a Sanshikan during Shō Gen and Shō Ei's reign.

Jana family (謝名一族) launched a rebellion against King Shō Nei in 1592. He took part in suppressing this rebellion together with Kochinda-Higa Seizoku (東風平比嘉 盛続) and Mabuni Ankō, and put down it successfully. All of them received ueekata, the highest rank in the yukatchu aristocracy of Ryukyu.

Satsuma invaded Ryukyu in the spring of 1609. When Satsuma troops approached Naha, he followed the sessei Gushichan Chōsei to hold peace talks with Satuma at Oyamise (親見世), but the peace proposal was rejected. After King Shō Nei's surrender, he was taken to Kagoshima together with King Shō Nei and a number of high officials by Satsuma troops. He returned to Ryukyu together with Gushichan Chōsei in the next year in order to deal with tributary affairs. Satsuma sent him to Ming China to pay tribute together with Kin Ōkai (金 応魁, also known as Gushi Pekumi 具志親雲上), but they tried to let Ming China get involved in secretly. Ming China refused to receive tribute from Ryukyu, until King Shō Nei was released by Satsuma in the year 1611.

Ikegusuku took the place of Urasoe Chōshi and became a member of Sanshikan. In 1623, he was sent to China together with Sai Ken (蔡 堅, also known as Kiyuna Pekumi 喜友名親雲上) to ask for investiture of King Shō Hō, and requested for permission to pay tribute once every five years. Ikegusuku was serious ill on the way home and died in Jiangnan.

Ikegusuku Anrai
Preceded by Ikegusuku Antō	Head of Mō-uji Ikegusuku Dunchi	Succeeded by Ikegusuku Ankan
Political offices
Preceded by Urasoe Chōshi	Sanshikan of Ryukyu; 1611 - 1623	Succeeded by Gushichan Anshi
