= Kochinda Ando =

Ryukyuan bureaucrat (died 1839)

- 東風平 安度

sanshikan of Ryukyu
- In office 1836–1839
- Preceded by: Ginowan Chōkon
- Succeeded by: Oroku Ryōkyō

Personal details
- Born: Unknown
- Died: 21 October 1839
- Chinese name: Mō Ishin (毛 惟新)
- Rank: Ueekata

Kochinda Ueekata Ando (東風平 親方 安度; d. 21 October 1839) also known by Takushi Ueekata Ando (沢岻 親方 安度) and his Chinese style name Mō Ishin (毛 惟新), was a bureaucrat of Ryukyu Kingdom.

King Shō Iku dispatched a gratitude envoy for his taking power to Edo, Japan in 1832. Prince Tomigusuku Chōshun and Ando was appointed as Envoy (正使, seishi) and Deputy Envoy (副使, fukushi) respectively. However, Prince Tomigusuku died in Kagoshima; Futenma Chōten (普天間 朝典, also known by Kanegusuku Chōten) served as the political decoy of the prince, took the title "Prince Tomigusuku", and went to Edo. They sailed back in the next year.

He served as a member of sanshikan from 1836 to 1839.

Political offices
Preceded by Ginowan Chōkon	Sanshikan of Ryukyu; 1836–1839	Succeeded by Oroku Ryōkyō
