= Yonabaru Ryōō =

Ryukyuan bureaucrat (1761–1820)

- 与那原 良応

sanshikan of Ryukyu
- In office 1805–1820
- Preceded by: Kyan Chōchō
- Succeeded by: Ishadō Seigen

Personal details
- Born: October 25, 1761
- Died: November 5, 1820 (aged 59)
- Chinese name: Ba Isai (馬 異才)
- Rank: Ueekata

Yonabaru Ueekata Ryōō (与那原 親方 良応; 25 October 1761 – 5 November 1820), also known by his Chinese style name Ba Isai (馬 異才), was a bureaucrat of the Ryukyu Kingdom.

Yonabaru Ryōō served as a member of Sanshikan from 1805 to 1820. In 1816, he translated Tongmeng Xuzhi (童蒙須知), a Confucian textbook suitable for teaching young children written by Zhu Xi, into Japanese, and taught at school.

Yonabaru Ryōō
| Preceded by Yonabaru Ryōtō | Head of Ba-uji Yonabaru Dunchi | Succeeded by Yonabaru Ryōkō |
Political offices
| Preceded by Kyan Chōchō | Sanshikan of Ryukyu; 1805 - 1820 | Succeeded by Ishadō Seigen |
