= Yonabaru Ryōtō =

Ryukyuan bureaucrat (1737–1803)

- 与那原 良頭

sanshikan of Ryukyu
- In office 1798–1803
- Preceded by: Fukuyama Chōki
- Succeeded by: Sadoyama Anshun

Personal details
- Born: April 4, 1737
- Died: November 20, 1803 (aged 66)
- Chinese name: Ba Bunzui (馬 文瑞)
- Rank: Ueekata

Yonabaru Ueekata Ryōtō (与那原 親方 良頭; 4 April 1737 – 20 November 1803) also known by Yasumura Ueekata Ryōtō (安村 親方 良頭) and his Chinese style name Ba Bunzui (馬 文瑞), was a bureaucrat of Ryukyu Kingdom. He was born to an aristocrat family called Ba-uji Yonabaru Dunchi (馬氏与那原殿内).

King Shō On dispatched a gratitude envoy for his accession to Edo, Japan in 1796. Prince Ōgimi Chōki (大宜見 朝規, also known by Misatō Chōki 美里 朝規 and Shō Kaku 尚 恪) and he was appointed as Envoy (正使, seishi) and Deputy Envoy (副使, fukushi) respectively. They sailed back in the next year.

He served as a member of Sanshikan from 1798 to 1803.

Yonabaru Ryōtō
Preceded by Yonabaru Ryōku	Head of Ba-uji Yonabaru Dunchi	Succeeded by Yonabaru Ryōō
Political offices
Preceded by Fukuyama Chōki	Sanshikan of Ryukyu; 1798 - 1803	Succeeded by Sadoyama Anshun
