= Oroku Ryōwa =

Ryukyuan bureaucrat (1765–1818)

- 小禄 良和

sanshikan of Ryukyu
- In office 1811–1818
- Preceded by: Takehara Anshitsu
- Succeeded by: Tamagusuku Seirin

Personal details
- Born: May 15, 1765
- Died: February 22, 1818 (aged 52)
- Parent(s): Hamamoto Ryōkyō (father); Oroku Ryōei (adoptive father)
- Chinese name: Ba Ōshō (馬 応昌)
- Rank: Ueekata

Oroku Ueekata Ryōwa (小禄 親方 良和; 15 May 1765 – 22 February 1818), also known by his Chinese style name Ba Ōshō (馬 応昌), was a bureaucrat of the Ryukyu Kingdom.

Oroku Ryōwa was a son of Hamamoto Ryōkyō (浜元 良恭). He was adopted by Oroku Ryōei (小禄 良穎) because Ryōei had no heir. Later, he became the tenth head of the aristocratic family called Ba-uji Oroku Dunchi (馬氏小禄殿内).

King Shō Kō dispatched a gratitude envoy for his accession to Edo, Japan in 1806. Prince Yuntanza Chōei (読谷山 朝英, also known as Shō Tairetsu 尚 太烈) and Oroku Ryōwa were appointed as Envoy (正使, seishi) and Deputy Envoy (副使, fukushi) respectively. They sailed back in the next year.

He served as a member of Sanshikan from 1811 to 1818.

Oroku Ryōwa
Preceded by Oroku Ryōei	Head of Ba-uji Oroku Dunchi	Succeeded by Oroku Ryōkyō
Political offices
Preceded by Takehara Anshitsu	Sanshikan of Ryukyu; 1811 - 1818	Succeeded by Tamagusuku Seirin
