= Ie Chōboku =

Ryukyuan bureaucrat

- 伊江 朝睦

sanshikan of Ryukyu
- In office 1782–1801
- Preceded by: Miyahira Ryōtei
- Succeeded by: Kyan Chōchō

Personal details
- Born: 1731
- Died: Unknown
- Chinese name: Shō Tenteki (向 天迪)
- Rank: Ueekata

Ie Ueekata Chōboku (伊江 親方 朝睦; 1731 – ?) also known by Ie Ueekata Chōkei (伊江 親方 朝慶) and his Chinese style name Shō Tenteki (向 天迪), was a bureaucrat of the Ryukyu Kingdom. He served as a member of sanshikan from 1782 to 1801.

In 1775, he and Kōchi Ryōtoku was ordered to make the first statutory law in Ryukyuan history by King Shō Boku. The law was completed in 1786. and was jointly signed by Ie and his two colleges, Yonabaru Ryōku (与那原 良矩) and Fukuyama Chōki (譜久山 朝紀). Later, it was officially promulgated and implemented by the king in the same year.

The mountain forests in Nakagami and Kunigami were withered. Ie was sent there to deal with it. He managed to propagate them by cutting off withered trees and planting trees in a reasonable method.

Ie's diary, Ie Ueekata Hinikki (伊江親方日々記), was a very important history record.

Ie was also the Eboshioya (烏帽子親) of King Shō On.

Political offices
Preceded by Miyahira Ryōtei	Sanshikan of Ryukyu; 1782 - 1801	Succeeded by Kyan Chōchō
