= Seishu =

Seishu may refer to:

- Seishu (清酒), another name for sake.
- Seishū (勢州), another name for Ise Province.
- Seishū (濟州), the Japanese name for Jeju Island.
- Hanaoka Seishū (華岡 青洲), a Japanese surgeon of the Edo period with a knowledge of Chinese herbal medicine.
- Hase Seishū (馳 星周), a well-known Japanese novelist.
- Seishu Hatake (畠 世周), Japanese baseball player
- Seishū Uragami (浦上 晟周), Japanese actor
- Zakimi Seishū (座喜味 盛秀), politician and bureaucrat
