= Urasoe Chōri =

Ryukyuan bureaucrat (died 1638)

- 浦添 朝利

sanshikan of Ryukyu
- In office 1636–1638
- Preceded by: Kunigami Chōchi
- Succeeded by: Ginowan Seisei

Personal details
- Born: 1??? Ryukyu Kingdom
- Died: c.1638 East China Sea or Philippine Sea?
- Parent: Urasoe Chōshi (father)
- Chinese name: Shō Kakusen (向 鶴躚)
- Rank: Ueekata

Urasoe Ueekata Chōri (浦添 親方 朝利; 1??? – 1638), also known by Urasoe Jūri (浦添 重利) and his Chinese style name Shō Kakusen (向 鶴躚), was a bureaucrat of the Ryukyu Kingdom.

== Biography ==
Urasoe Chōri was a son of Urasoe Chōshi, and was also an younger brother of Kunigami Chōchi. He was elected as a member of Sanshikan in 1636.

== Disappearance ==
A Spanish ship docked at Ishigaki Island in 1624. Juan de los Angeles Rueda, who was a missionary of the Dominican Order, preached to local people. Though Christianity was banned by Japan at that time, Rueda was sheltered by a local officer Ishigaki Eishō (石垣 永将). He was uncovered in 1634, resulting with both Ishigaki and Rueda sent into exile and later executed. This incident was known by Yaeyama Kirishitan Incident (八重山キリシタン事件). After this incident, Ryukyu started to investigate religious beliefs of its people, and forced Christians to convert (Shūmon-aratame 宗門改). Urasoe Chōri went to Satsuma to report the result of Shūmon-aratame, but on the way home, his ship was caught in a storm and disappeared in the sea. His position was vacant until 1641.

== See also ==
- List of people who disappeared mysteriously at sea

Political offices
Preceded by Kunigami Chōchi	Sanshikan of Ryukyu; 1636 - 1638	Succeeded by Ginowan Seisei
