= Katsuren =

Katsuren (Japanese: 勝連) can refer to several things:

- Katsuren, Okinawa, a former town in Okinawa Prefecture, Japan.
- Katsuren Castle, a Ryukyuan gusuku in Uruma, Okinawa.
- Katsuren Peninsula, a peninsula on Okinawa Island.
- Katsuren Seiyū, a bureaucrat of Ryukyu Kingdom.
- Chie Katsuren, a Japanese handball player.
