= Kōchi Ryōtoku =

Ryukyuan bureaucrat (died 1798)

- 幸地 良篤

sanshikan of Ryukyu
- In office 1796–1798
- Preceded by: Yonabaru Ryōku
- Succeeded by: Takehara Anshitsu

Personal details
- Born: Unknown
- Died: 24 June 1798
- Chinese name: Ba Kokugi (馬 克義)
- Rank: Ueekata

Kōchi Ueekata Ryōtoku (幸地 親方 良篤; d. 24 June 1798) also known by his Chinese style name Ba Kokugi (馬 克義), was a bureaucrat of Ryukyu Kingdom.

In 1775, Kōchi Ryōtoku and Ie Chōkei was ordered to make the first statutory law in Ryukyuan history by King Shō Boku. The law was completed in 1786. It was called Ryūkyū Karitsu (琉球科律), and was jointly signed by Yonabaru Ryōku, Fukuyama Chōki and Ie Chōkei, all were members of sanshikan. It was officially promulgated and implemented by the king in the same year.

Kōchi was dispatched together with Prince Ginowan Chōyō (also known by Ginowan Chōshō) in 1790 to celebrate Tokugawa Ienari succeeded as shōgun of the Tokugawa shogunate. They sailed back in the next year.

Kōchi served as a member of sanshikan from 1796 to 1798.

Political offices
Preceded by Yonabaru Ryōku	Sanshikan of Ryukyu; 1796–1798	Succeeded by Takehara Anshitsu
