= Urasoe Chōshō =

Ryukyuan bureaucrat (1825–1883)

- 浦添 朝昭
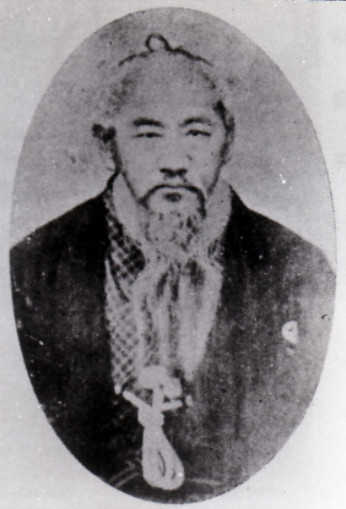

sanshikan of Ryukyu
- In office 1872–1879
- Preceded by: Kamegawa Seibu
- Succeeded by: title abolished

Personal details
- Born: July 25, 1825 Ryukyu Kingdom
- Died: January 6, 1883 (aged 57) Shuri, Okinawa, Empire of Japan
- Parent: Kuniyoshi Chōshō (father)
- Chinese name: Shō Kyoken (向 居謙)
- Rank: Ueekata

Urasoe Ueekata Chōshō (浦添 親方 朝昭; 25 July 1825 – 6 January 1883), also known by his Chinese style name Shō Kyoken (向 居謙), was a politician and bureaucrat of Ryukyu Kingdom.

Chōshō was born to an aristocrat family called Shō-uji Urasoe Dunchi (向氏浦添殿内). He was the 14th head of Urasoe Dunchi, and his father Kuniyoshi Chōshō (国吉 朝章, also known as Shō Ryōhitsu 向 良弼), was a Sanshikan during Shō Iku's reign.

Chōshō was selected as a member of the Sanshikan in 1872. In 1876, Ryukyu had to break off diplomatic relations with Qing China under pressure from Imperial Japan. Chōshō sent Kōchi Chōjō, Rin Seikō and Sai Taitei (蔡 大鼎) to China to seek help.

In 1879, the Meiji government decided to abolish the Ryukyu Domain, and sent Matsuda Michiyuki to Shuri. Chōshō met Michiyuki and tried to prevent it but failed. Ryukyu was annexed by Japan and it was later organized as Okinawa Prefecture. Two of the last three Sanshikan returned to Okinawa, and Urasoe Chōshō and Tomikawa Seikei were appointed advisers of Okinawa Prefecture, but both of them wanted to restore the Ryukyu Domain. Chōshō stayed in Shuri, while Seikei fled to Fuzhou. The other Sanshikan, Yonabaru Ryōketsu, went to Tokyo serving as Keishi (家司) of the former King Shō Tai. All of them struggled for this ideal until their deaths.

Chōshō was good at waka and Han learning.

Urasoe Chōshō
Preceded by Kuniyoshi Chōshō	Head of Shō-uji Urasoe Dunchi	Succeeded by ?
Political offices
Preceded by Kamegawa Seibu	Sanshikan of Ryukyu; 1872 - 1879	title abolished
