= Yarazamori Castle =

Ryukyuan gusuku in Naha, Okinawa, Japan

Yarazamori Castle 屋良座森城
- Naha, Okinawa
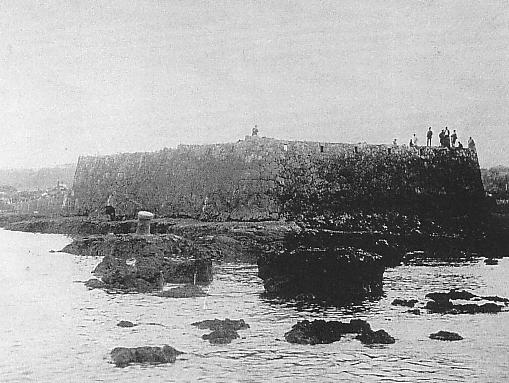
- Yarazamori Castle before 1945

Site information
- Type: Gusuku
- Owner: United States Navy
- Controlled by: Ryūkyū Kingdom (1546–1879); Empire of Japan (1879–1945); United States (1945-present)
- Open to the public: No
- Condition: Demolished

Location

Site history
- Built: 1546
- Built by: Shō Sei
- In use: 1546-1950
- Materials: Ryukyuan limestone
- Demolished: 1950
- Battles/wars: Pirate attacks (1553, 1556), Invasion of Ryukyu (1609), Battle of Okinawa (1945)

Garrison information
- Past commanders: Jana Ueekata

Yarazamori Castle (屋良座森城, Yarazamori jō; Okinawan: Yarazamui gushiku) was a Ryūkyūan gusuku in Naha, Okinawa, Japan. It was located on the southern mouth of the Kokuba River in Naha Port.

== History ==
Yarazamori Castle was built on the southern mouth of Naha Port in 1546 by King Shō Sei. It was built to defend the port and city of Naha, alongside its sister Mie Castle. Between the two castles, an iron chain boom-net could be drawn up to deny ships access to the harbor. Yarazamori Castle, the larger of the two, was armed with 7–9 cm cannons. The defenders were also armed with pikes and native-made hand cannons. These defenses were intended for use against pirates, however they also proved successful in driving away the fleet of the Satsuma during their 1609 invasion, where Yarazamori proved pivotal. The castle would continue to be used for anti-piracy, however it became generally used for seeing ships off by civilians.

Originally, the castle was built in the middle of the water, with a long causeway connecting it to the mainland. Over time however, sediment became deposited between the causeway and the land to the south until the causeway served as the coast. After the 1945 Battle of Okinawa, the United States established the southern shore of Naha Port as a naval base. As part of expanding the base, Yarazamori Castle was demolished in 1950.
