= Chōei =

- Gender: Male

Origin
- Origin: Japanese
- Meaning: Different meanings depending on the kanji used

Chōei or Choei (written: 長栄, 長英, 朝衛, 朝盈 or 朝英) is a masculine Japanese given name. Notable people with the name include:

- Gushikawa Chōei (具志川 朝盈) (1610–????), a member of the royal family of the Ryukyu Kingdom
- Kochinda Chōei (東風平 朝衛) (1701–1765), bureaucrat of Ryukyu Kingdom
- Takano Chōei (高野 長英) (1804–1850), Japanese scholar
- Choei Sato (佐藤 長栄) (born 1951), Japanese footballer
- Yuntanza Chōei (読谷山 朝英) (1768–1817), a prince of Ryukyu Kingdom
