= Kunigami Keimei =

Ryukyuan bureaucrat

Kunigami Ueekata Keimei (国頭 親方 景明; ? – ?), also known by Urasoe Keimei (浦添 景明) and his Chinese style name Wa Imi (和 為美), was a bureaucrat of the Ryukyu Kingdom.

He was father-in-law of Aragusuku Anki. In the summer 1555, King Shō Sei became seriously ill. The king ordered Kunigami Keimei, Gusukuma Shūshin and Aragusuku Anki, all of them were members of Sanshikan, to assist the Crown Prince Shō Gen. But after the king's death, Kunigami and Gusukuma broke their promises and said that Shō Gen was too sickly to succeed the throne. They suggested that Shō Kanshin (尚 鑑心), who was the fourth son of Shō Sei and titled Great Prince Ie (大伊江王子), should be the next king. Aragusuku stood in the audience hall with a naginata in his hand, and called on all ministers to comply with the will. Finally, Shō Gen ascended to the throne. Kunigami was exiled to Kume Island and Gusukuma to Iheya Island in 1559, respectively.

Both of them lost official position and peerage and were not allowed to return to Shuri until their political opponent Aragusuku died 1567. He regained his peerage and was given Urasoe magiri as his new hereditary fief.
