= Goeku Chōsei =

Ryukyuan bureaucrat (1621–1695)

- 越来 朝誠

sanshikan of Ryukyu
- In office 1675–1683
- Preceded by: Gushichan Antō
- Succeeded by: Inamine Seihō

Personal details
- Born: December 23, 1621
- Died: May 1, 1695 (aged 73)
- Chinese name: Shō Mizai (向 美材)
- Rank: Ueekata

Goeku Ueekata Chōsei (越来 親方 朝誠; 23 December 1621–1 May 1695) also known by his Chinese style name Shō Mizai (向 美材), was a bureaucrat of the Ryukyu Kingdom.

Goeku was born to an aristocrat family called Shō-uji Wakugawa Dunchi (向氏湧川殿内), later became the eighth head of this family. He was also a descendant of King Shō Sen'i.

King Shō Tei dispatched a gratitude envoy for his accession to Edo, Japan in 1671. Prince Kin Chōkō (金武 朝興, also known by Shō Ki 尚 熙) and he was appointed as Envoy (正使, seishi) and Deputy Envoy (副使, fukushi) respectively. They sailed back in the next year.

He served as a member of Sanshikan from 1675 to 1683.

Goeku Chōsei
Preceded by Goeku Chōjō	Head of Shō-uji Wakugawa Dunchi	Succeeded by Goeku Chōsei
Political offices
Preceded by Gushichan Antō	Sanshikan of Ryukyu; 1675–1683	Succeeded by Inamine Seihō
