= Yonabaru Ryōchō =

Ryukyuan bureaucrat (1698–1754)

- 与那原 良暢

sanshikan of Ryukyu
- In office 1752–1754
- Preceded by: Zakimi Seishū
- Succeeded by: Miyahira Ryōtei

Personal details
- Born: December 16, 1698
- Died: October 17, 1754 (aged 55)
- Chinese name: Ba Genretsu (馬 元烈)
- Rank: Ueekata

Yonabaru Ueekata Ryōchō (与那原 親方 良暢; 16 December 1698 – 17 October 1754), also known by his Chinese style name Ba Genretsu (馬 元烈), was a politician and bureaucrat of the Ryukyu Kingdom. He was born to an aristocrat family Ba-uji Yonabaru Dunchi (馬氏与那原殿内).

King Shō Kei dispatched Prince Gushichan Chōri (具志川 朝利, also known as Shō Shōki 尚 承基) and him in 1748 to celebrate Tokugawa Ieshige succeeded as shōgun of the Tokugawa shogunate. They sailed back in the next year.

He served as a member of sanshikan from 1752 to 1754.

Yonabaru Ryōchō
Preceded by Yonabaru Ryōshō	Head of Ba-uji Yonabaru Dunchi	Succeeded by Yonabaru Ryōku
Political offices
Preceded by Zakimi Seishū	Sanshikan of Ryukyu; 1752–1754	Succeeded by Miyahira Ryōtei
