= Ishadō Seigen =

Ryukyuan bureaucrat (1776–1842)

- 伊舎堂 盛元

sanshikan of Ryukyu
- In office 1821–1828
- Preceded by: Yonabaru Ryōō
- Succeeded by: Yonabaru Ryōkō

Personal details
- Born: March 13, 1776
- Died: November 3, 1842 (aged 66)
- Chinese name: Ō Kōretsu (翁 宏烈)
- Rank: Ueekata

Ishadō Ueekata Seigen (伊舎堂 親方 盛元; 13 March 1776 – 3 November 1842), also known as his Chinese style name Ō Kōretsu (翁 宏烈), was a bureaucrat of the Ryukyu Kingdom.

Ishadō served as a member of Sanshikan from 1821 to 1828. He was also known by good at writing waka poetry, and was designated as a member of the Okinawan Thirty-Six Immortals of Poetry (沖縄三十六歌仙, Okinawa Sanjūrokkasen).

Political offices
Preceded by Yonabaru Ryōō	Sanshikan of Ryukyu; 1821 - 1828	Succeeded by Yonabaru Ryōkō
