= Shūshin =

Shūshin may refer to:

- Shūshin koyō, a term for permanent employment in Japan
- Gidō Shūshin (1325–1388), Japanese writer
- Gusukuma Shūshin (1507–1585), Japanese bureaucrat of the Ryukyu Kingdom
