= Kanegusuku Chōten =

Ryukyuan bureaucrat (died 1839)

- 兼城 朝典
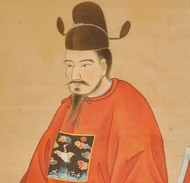
- Portrait of "Prince Tomigusuku" by Toda Ujitsune on 17 December 1832 (Japanese calendar: 16 November, Tenpō 3) in Edo, Japan. In fact this man is the Futenma Chōten, a political decoy of Prince Tomigusuku Chōshun. Prince Tomigusuku died on 23 September 1832 (Chinese calendar: 29 August, Daoguang 12) in Kagoshima.

sanshikan of Ryukyu
- In office 1836–1839
- Preceded by: Zakimi Seichin
- Succeeded by: Kuniyoshi Chōshō

Personal details
- Born: Unknown
- Died: December 4, 1839
- Parent: Tomigusuku Chōkō (father)
- Chinese name: Shō Tatsukan (向 達寛), later Shō Kan (向 寛)
- Rank: Ueekata

Kanegusuku Ueekata Chōten (兼城 親方 朝典; ? – 4 December 1839), also known by Futenma Chōten (普天間 朝典), his Chinese-style name Shō Kan (向 寛) and Shō Tatsukan (向 達寛), was a bureaucrat of the Ryukyu Kingdom.

Chōten was the second son of Prince Tomigusuku Chōkō (豊見城 朝興), and he was also a younger brother of Prince Tomigusuku Chōshun.

Tomigusuku Chōshun and Takushi Ando were dispatched as a gratitude envoy for King Shō Iku's taking power to Edo, Japan, in 1832. Chōten sent as sangikan (讃議官) in the mission. However, Prince Tomigusuku died in Kagoshima on 23 September 1832 (lunar calendar 29 August). Chōten served as the political decoy of the prince, took the title "Prince Tomigusuku" and went to Edo. They sailed back in the next year.

Chōten served as a member of sanshikan from 1836 to 1839. He was sent to China together with Yō Tokushō (楊 徳昌) and Ba Ikō (馬 維興) as a gratitude envoy for King Shō Iku's investiture. In the next year, he was seriously ill on the way home and died in Fuzhou.

Political offices
Preceded by Zakimi Seichin	Sanshikan of Ryukyu; 1836–1839	Succeeded by Kuniyoshi Chōshō
