= Yonabaru Ryōku =

Ryukyuan bureaucrat (1718–1797)

- 与那原 良矩

sanshikan of Ryukyu
- In office 1769–1796
- Preceded by: Ikegusuku Anmei
- Succeeded by: Kōchi Ryōtoku

Personal details
- Born: 26 July 1718 (29 June, 57th year of Kangxi)
- Died: 10 December 1797 (aged 79) (23 October, 2nd year of Jiaqing)
- Chinese name: Ba Kokuki (馬 国器)
- Rank: Ueekata
- Nickname: Kunshi Ueekata (君子親方)

Yonabaru Ueekata Ryōku (与那原 親方 良矩; 26 July 1718 – 10 December 1797), also known by his Chinese style name Ba Kokuki (馬 国器), was a bureaucrat of the Ryukyu Kingdom.

He was the ninth head of an aristocrat family, Ba-uji Yonabaru Dunchi (馬氏与那原殿内). He was dispatched to China to pay tribute together with Ryō Kō (梁 煌) in 1762, and was sent to Satsuma to report this in 1665.

Yonabaru served as a member of the sanshikan from 1769 to 1796. He managed to run the country by Confucianism, and earned the nickname Kunshi Ueekata (君子親方, "high-minded ueekata"). He put forward a proposal to make the first statutory law in Ryukyuan history together with his two colleagues, Miyahira Ryōtei and Wakugawa Chōkyō, and the sessei Yuntanza Chōkō in 1775. This proposal was approved by King Shō Boku. The law was completed by Ie Chōkei and Kōchi Ryōtoku in 1786. It was called Ryūkyū Karitsu (琉球科律), and was jointly signed by Yonabaru and his two colleagues, Fukuyama Chōki (譜久山 朝紀) and Ie Chōkei. It was officially promulgated and implemented by the king in the same year.

Yonabaru was skilled at ryūka poetry. He was designated a member of the Okinawan Thirty-Six Immortals of Poetry (沖縄三十六歌仙, Okinawa Sanjūrokkasen).

Yonabaru Ryōku
Preceded by Yonabaru Ryōchō	Head of Ba-uji Yonabaru Dunchi	Succeeded by Yonabaru Ryōtō
Political offices
Preceded by Ikegusuku Anmei	Sanshikan of Ryukyu; 1769 - 1796	Succeeded by Kōchi Ryōtoku
