= Sadoyama Anji =

17th-century Ryukyuan bureaucrat

- 佐渡山 安治

sanshikan of Ryukyu
- In office 1688–1693
- Preceded by: Inoha Seiki
- Succeeded by: Yonabaru Ryōgi

Personal details
- Parent: Ikegusuku Ansei (father)
- Chinese name: Mō Kokuzui (毛 国瑞)
- Rank: Ueekata

Sadoyama Ueekata Anji (佐渡山 親方 安治; fl. 17th century) also known by Onna Ueekata Anji (恩納 親方 安治) and his Chinese style name Mō Kokuzui (毛 国瑞), was a bureaucrat of the Ryukyu Kingdom.

Anji was the second son of Ikegusuku Ansei (池城 安成). In 1673, Onna magiri (恩納間切, modern Onna, Okinawa) was established, and granted to Anji as his hereditary fief. He was the originator of Mō-uji Sadoyama Dunchi (毛氏佐渡山殿内).

He was sent to Miyako and Yaeyama to carry out political reform in 1678. King Shō Tei dispatched Prince Nago Chōgen (名護 朝元, also known as Shō Kōjin 尚 弘仁) and him in 1682 to celebrate Tokugawa Tsunayoshi succeeded as shōgun of the Tokugawa shogunate. In the next year, Prince Nago died in Kagoshima, and Anji sailed back to Ryukyu.

Anji served as a member of Sanshikan from 1688 to 1693.

Political offices
| Preceded by Inoha Seiki | Sanshikan of Ryukyu; 1688–1693 | Succeeded by Yonabaru Ryōgi |
