= Kunigami Chōchi =

Ryukyuan bureaucrat (died 1635)

- 国頭 朝致
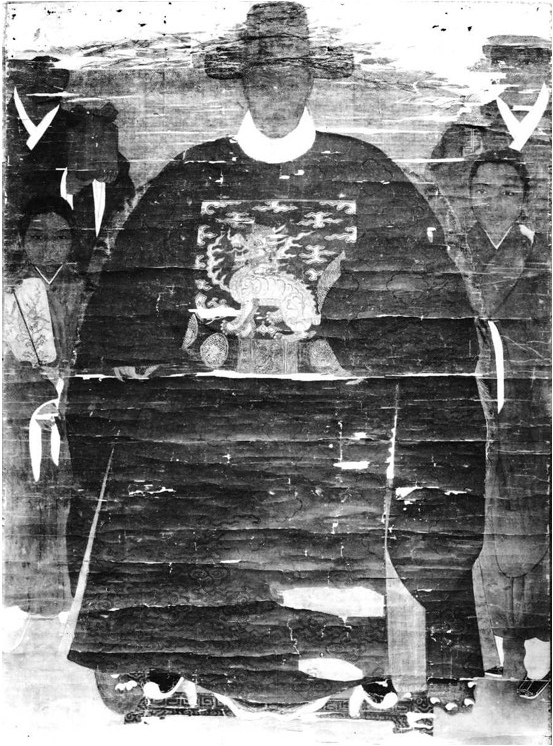

sanshikan of Ryukyu
- In office 1622–1635
- Preceded by: Tomigusuku Seizoku
- Succeeded by: Urasoe Chōri

Personal details
- Born: Unknown Ryukyu Kingdom
- Died: 27 July 1635 Fujian Province, Ming China
- Parent: Urasoe Chōshi (father)
- Chinese name: Shō Kakurei (向 鶴齢)
- Rank: Ueekata

Kunigami Ueekata Chōchi (国頭 親方 朝致; ? – 27 July 1635), also known by Kunigami Jūshin (国頭 重信) and his Chinese style name Shō Kakurei (向 鶴齢), was a bureaucrat of Ryukyu Kingdom.

Kunigami was the originator of an aristocrat family called Shō-uji Ōgimi Dunchi (向氏大宜見殿内). He was a son of Urasoe Chōshi, and was also an elder brother of Urasoe Chōri. He was elected as a member of Sanshikan in 1622.

In 1633, King Shō Hō dispatched him and Sai Ken (蔡 堅, also known as Kiyuna Pekumi 喜友名親雲上) as a gratitude envoy for his investiture to Ming China. Kunigami requested for permission to pay tribute twice every three years just like before the country was invaded by Satsuma. It was approved by Chongzhen Emperor. Two years later, Kunigami was serious ill on the way home and died in Fujian Province.

Political offices
Preceded by Tomigusuku Seizoku	Sanshikan of Ryukyu; 1622 - 1635	Succeeded by Urasoe Chōri
