= Ishadō Seifu =

Ryukyuan bureaucrat (1659–1721)

- 伊舎堂 盛富

sanshikan of Ryukyu
- In office 1712–1721
- Preceded by: Shikina Seimei
- Succeeded by: Ufugusuku Chōshō

Personal details
- Born: September 1, 1659
- Died: November 15, 1721 (aged 62)
- Chinese name: Ō Jidō (翁 自道)
- Rank: Ueekata

Ishadō Ueekata Seifu (伊舎堂 親方 盛富; 1 September 1659 – 15 November 1721), also known by his Chinese style name Ō Jidō (翁 自道), was a bureaucrat of the Ryukyu Kingdom.

Ishadō had been dispatched as envoys to China and Japan for several times. In 1694, he brought yellow potatoes from Fujian Province, China and planted them around his house. Later, he spread them to people. The yellow potatoes propagated around the country and soon became the main food of common people.

Ishadō served as a member of Sanshikan from 1712 to 1721.

Political offices
Preceded by Shikina Seimei	Sanshikan of Ryukyu; 1712 - 1721	Succeeded by Ufugusuku Chōshō
