= Yonabaru Ryōketsu =

Ryukyuan bureaucrat (1836–1893)

- 与那原 良傑
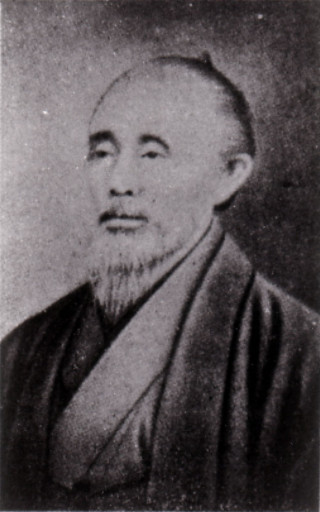

sanshikan of Ryukyu
- In office 1877–1879
- Preceded by: Ikegusuku Anki
- Succeeded by: title abolished

Personal details
- Born: February 8, 1836 Ryukyu Kingdom
- Died: December 22, 1893 (aged 57) Shuri, Okinawa, Empire of Japan
- Parent: Yonabaru Ryōkyō (father)
- Chinese name: Ba Kensai (馬 兼才)
- Rank: Ueekata

Yonabaru Ueekata Ryōketsu (与那原 親方 良傑; 8 February 1836 – 22 December 1893), also known by his Chinese style name Ba Kensai (馬 兼才), was a politician, bureaucrat and diplomat of Ryukyu Kingdom.

Ryōketsu was born to an aristocrat family called Ba-uji Yonabaru Dunchi (馬氏与那原殿内). His father Yonabaru Ryōkyō (与那原 良恭, also known as Ba Chōtō 馬 朝棟), was a Sanshikan from 1859 to 1871.

In 1876, Ryukyu had to break off diplomatic relations with Qing China under the pressure of Imperial Japan. Ikegusuku Anki led a mission to Tokyo to register a complaint. Yonabaru Ryōketsu was good at diplomacy and the Japanese language, so he was sent as an assistant. But the Shogunate ignored the mission. Ikegusuku Anki died in 1877, Ryōketsu succeeded him as a member of Sanshikan. Ryōketsu contacted envoys of Western countries and tried to get them involved, but there was little response. He Ruzhang (何如璋) and Huang Zunxian were appointed the Imperial Chinese envoy and counselor, respectively, and went to Tokyo by ship in the same year. Ryōketsu met them secretly when their ship passed Kobe, and petitioned Qing China to rescue the Ryukyu from annexation by Japan.

In 1879, Ryukyu was annexed by Japan, and later, Japan declared the creation of Okinawa Prefecture. King Shō Tai moved to Tokyo in the same year, Ryōketsu serving as Keishi (家司) of the former king. The last three Sanshikan, Urasoe Chōshō, Tomikawa Seikei and Yonabaru Ryōketsu, all wanted to restore the Ryukyu Domain, and they struggled for this ideal until their deaths.

Ryōketsu was also the Eboshioya (烏帽子親) of Shō In (Prince Ginowan) and Shō Jun (Prince Matsuyama).

Yonabaru Ryōketsu
Preceded by Yonabaru Ryōkyō	Head of Ba-uji Yonabaru Dunchi	title abolished
Political offices
Preceded by Ikegusuku Anki	Sanshikan of Ryukyu; 1877 - 1879	title abolished
