= Chatan Chōchō =

Ryukyuan bureaucrat (1607–1667)

- 北谷 朝暢

sanshikan of Ryukyu
- In office 1652–1666
- Preceded by: Ōsato Ryōan
- Succeeded by: Gushichan Antō

Personal details
- Born: November 28, 1607
- Died: July 11, 1667 (aged 59)
- Chinese name: Go Kokuyō (呉 国用), later Shō Kokuyō (向 国用)
- Rank: Ueekata

Chatan Ueekata Chōchō (北谷 親方 朝暢; 28 November 1607 – 11 July 1667), also known by his Chinese style name Shō Kokuyō (向 国用), was a bureaucrat of the Ryukyu Kingdom.

Chatan Chōchō was an uncle of the famous sessei Shō Shōken. He served as a member of Sanshikan from 1652 to 1666.

In 1663, King Shō Shitsu dispatched Chatan as a gratitude envoy for his investiture to Qing China. The mission stayed at Fuzhou on their way home the next year. King Shō Shitsu dispatched Eso Jūkō (恵祖 重孝, also known as Ei Jōshun 英 常春) as a congratulatory envoy to celebrate Kangxi Emperor's coronation at the same time. But Eso's envoy was shipwrecked near Meihua Port (梅花港, a port in modern Changle, Fuzhou) in the mouth of Min River, and was attacked by pirates. Eso fled to Fuzhou, some of his entourage were murdered by poison, and golden pots prepared for Kangxi Emperor were stolen.

Two envoys came back to Ryukyu in 1665. Soon Chatan found the truth: the pirates were actually Ryukyuans disguised as Chinese, and all of them were his entourage. When the ship passed by Iheya Island, he threw all participants into the sea in order to hush up the incident. But finally the truth was known by Satsuma Domain. Both Chatan and Eso were sentenced to death by Satsuma, and decapitated by Ryukyu Kingdom. Their eight sons were exiled to outlying islands and imprisoned at temples (寺預). This incident was known as Chatan Eso Incident (北谷恵祖事件).

Political offices
Preceded by Ōsato Ryōan	Sanshikan of Ryukyu; 1652 - 1666	Succeeded by Gushichan Antō
