= Miyahira =

Miyahira (written: 宮平) is a Japanese surname. Notable people with the surname include:

- Hideharu Miyahira (宮平 秀治, born 1973), Japanese ski jumper
- Katsuya Miyahira (宮平 勝哉, 1918–2010), Japanese karateka
- Miyahira Ryōtei (宮平 良廷), Ryukyuan bureaucrat
