= Oroku Ryōkyō =

Ryukyuan bureaucrat (1798–1859)

- 小禄 良恭

sanshikan of Ryukyu
- In office 1839–1847
- Preceded by: Kochinda Ando
- Succeeded by: Zakimi Seifu

Personal details
- Born: October 1, 1798
- Died: November 3, 1859 (aged 61)
- Parent: Oroku Ryōwa (father)
- Chinese name: Ba Inchū (馬 允中)
- Rank: Ueekata

Oroku Ueekata Ryōkyō (小禄 親方 良恭; 1 October 1798 – 3 November 1859), also known by his Chinese-style name Ba Inchū (馬 允中), was a bureaucrat of Ryukyu Kingdom.

Oroku Ryōkyō born to an aristocrat family called Ba-uji Oroku Dunchi (馬氏小禄殿内), and was given the name Oroku Ryōkō (小禄 良綱). He was the eldest son of Oroku Ryōwa. He was appointed as odori bugyō (踊奉行, "Magistrate of dance") by King Shō Kō in 1808 and danced kumi odori for the entertainment of the Chinese envoys.

He succeeded as the eleventh head of Ba-uji Oroku Dunchi after his father died in 1818.

Oroku was elected as a member of Sanshikan in 1839. Oroku changed his name to Ryōkyō (良恭) to avoid confusion with his colleague, Yonabaru Ryōkō (与那原 良綱, also known as Ba Tokubō 馬 徳懋). He retired in 1847.

Oroku Ryōkyō
Preceded by Oroku Ryōwa	Head of Ba-uji Oroku Dunchi	Succeeded by Oroku Ryōchū
Political offices
Preceded by Kochinda Ando	Sanshikan of Ryukyu; 1839–1847	Succeeded by Zakimi Seifu
