= Urasoe Ryōken =

Ryukyuan bureaucrat (died 1566)

- 浦添 良憲

sanshikan of Ryukyu
- In office ?–1566
- Preceded by: Aragusuku Anki
- Succeeded by: Nago Ryōin

Personal details
- Born: Unknown
- Died: November 4, 1566
- Children: Nago Ryōin (son)
- Parent: Nukanakagusuku (father)
- Childhood name: Umitarugani (思太郎金)
- Chinese name: Ba Ryōsen (馬 良詮)
- Rank: Ueekata
- Nickname: Ufu Urasoe Ueekata (大浦添親方)

Urasoe Ueekata Ryōken (浦添 親方 良憲; ? – 4 November 1566), also known by Ufu Urasoe Ueekata (大浦添親方) and his Chinese style name Ba Ryōsen (馬 良詮), was a bureaucrat of Ryukyu Kingdom.

Urasoe was the eldest son of Nukanakagusuku (糠中城), and was also a grandson of Yuwan Ufunushi. Urasoe was the adoptive father of King Shō Gen. He raised Shō Gen and they had a close relationship. After Aragusuku Anki retired, Urasoe was appointed as a member of Sanshikan.

Urasoe was the originator of Ba-uji Oroku Dunchi (馬氏小禄殿内), which was one of the "Five Aristocratic Families" (五大名門) in Ryukyuan history. He was buried in Miagemori (見上森陵) after he died. King Shō Gen attended his funeral. His eldest son, Nago Ryōin, succeeded his position.

Urasoe Ryōken
title created	Head of Ba-uji Oroku Dunchi	Succeeded by Nago Ryōin
Political offices
Preceded by Aragusuku Anki	Sanshikan of Ryukyu ? - 1566	Succeeded by Nago Ryōin
