= Tomigusuku Seiryō =

Ryukyuan bureaucrat (1586–1642)

- 豊見城 盛良

sanshikan of Ryukyu
- In office 1627–1642
- Preceded by: Gushichan Anshi
- Succeeded by: Kunigami Chōki

Personal details
- Born: July 1, 1586 Ryukyu Kingdom
- Died: September 26, 1642 (aged 56) near Tokunoshima
- Parent: Tomigusuku Seizoku (father)
- Chinese name: Mō Taiun (毛 泰運)
- Rank: Ueekata

Tomigusuku Ueekata Seiryō (豊見城 親方 盛良; 1 July 1586 – 26 September 1642), also known by his Chinese style name Mō Taiun (毛 泰運), was a bureaucrat of the Ryukyu Kingdom.

Tomigusuku Seiryō was the sixth head of an aristocrat family called Mō-uji Tomigusuku Dunchi (毛氏豊見城殿内). He was the eldest son of Tomigusuku Seizoku.

Tomigusuku was elected as a member of Sanshikan in 1627. King Shō Hō dispatched Prince Chatan Chōshū (北谷 朝秀, also known as Shō Kei 尚 慶) and him in 1638 to celebrate Shimazu Mitsuhisa succeeded as daimyō of Satsuma. Prince Chatan returned to Ryukyu in the next year, but Tomigusuku remained in Satsuma to handle official business. He sailed back to Ryukyu in 1642 but his ship was shipwrecked near Tokunoshima. His body was not found so he had no grave.

Tomigusuku Seiryō
Preceded by Tomigusuku Seizoku	Head of Mō-uji Tomigusuku Dunchi	Succeeded by Tomigusuku Seijō
Political offices
Preceded by Gushichan Anshi	Sanshikan of Ryukyu; 1627–1642	Succeeded by Kunigami Chōki
