= Ikegusuku Anken =

Ryukyuan bureaucrat (1635–1695)

- 池城 安憲

sanshikan of Ryukyu
- In office 1670–1690
- Preceded by: Mabuni Chōi
- Succeeded by: Takehara An'i

Personal details
- Born: October 29, 1635
- Died: April 30, 1695 (aged 59)
- Parent: Ikegusuku Ansei (father)
- Chinese name: Mō Kokuchin (毛 国珍)
- Rank: Ueekata

Ikegusuku Ueekata Anken (池城 親方 安憲; 29 October 1635 – 30 April 1695), also known by his Chinese style name Mō Kokuchin (毛 国珍), was a bureaucrat of Ryukyu Kingdom.

Anken was born to an aristocrat family called Mō-uji Ikegusuku Dunchi (毛氏池城殿内). He was the eldest son of Ikegusuku Ansei (池城 安成). Later, he became the sixth head of this family.

Anken served as a member of sanshikan from 1670 to 1690. He was dispatched to Satsuma for several times. He was sent to China together with Ō Minsa (王 明佐, also known by Kokuba Pekumi 国場親雲上) as a gratitude envoy for King Shō Tei's investiture in 1683.

Ikegusuku Anken
Preceded by Ikegusuku Ansei	Head of Mō-uji Ikegusuku Dunchi	Succeeded by Noza Ansen
Political offices
Preceded by Mabuni Chōi	Sanshikan of Ryukyu; 1670 - 1690	Succeeded by Takehara An'i
