= Kochinda Chōei =

Ryukyuan bureaucrat (1701–1765)

- 東風平 朝衛

sanshikan of Ryukyu
- In office 1752–1765
- Preceded by: Sai On
- Succeeded by: Wakugawa Chōkyō

Personal details
- Born: 1701
- Died: 20 February 1765 (aged 63–64)
- Parent: Kushi Chōu (father)
- Chinese name: Shō Ketsu (向 傑)
- Rank: Ueekata

Kochinda Ueekata Chōei (東風平 親方 朝衛; 1701 – 20 February 1765), also known by his Chinese style name Shō Ketsu (向 傑), was a bureaucrat of Ryukyu Kingdom.

Kochinda was the eldest son of Kushi Chōu (久志 朝右), and he was also the second head of an aristocrat family, Shō-uji Tōme Dunchi (向氏当銘殿内). His younger brother Tasato Chōchoku, was a famous kumi odori playwright.

Kochinda served as a member of sanshikan from 1752 to 1765. He was good at ryūka and waka poetry, and was designated as a member of the Okinawan Thirty-Six Immortals of Poetry (沖縄三十六歌仙, Okinawa Sanjūrokkasen).

Political offices
Preceded by Sai On (Gushichan Bunjaku)	Sanshikan of Ryukyu; 1752 - 1765	Succeeded by Wakugawa Chōkyō
