= Zakimi Seishū =

Ryukyuan bureaucrat (1699–1766)

- 座喜味 盛秀

sanshikan of Ryukyu
- In office 1750–1752
- Preceded by: Ginowan Chōga
- Succeeded by: Yonabaru Ryōchō

Personal details
- Born: November 11, 1699
- Died: March 9, 1766 (aged 66)
- Chinese name: Mō Kyōken (毛 恭倹)
- Rank: Ueekata

Zakimi Ueekata Seishū (座喜味 親方 盛秀; 11 November 1699 – 9 March 1766), also known by his Chinese style name Mō Kyōken (毛 恭倹), was a politician and bureaucrat of the Ryukyu Kingdom.

He was the fourth head of an aristocrat family called Mō-uji Zakimi Dunchi (毛氏座喜味殿内).

In 1737, a Yaeyama-based vessel was shipwrecked off the coast of Hizen Province, and the crew were rescued by Saga Domain. Zakimi Seishū was dispatched as a gratitude envoy to Japan in 1737.

Zakimi served as a member of Sanshikan from 1750 to 1752.

Political offices
Preceded by Ginowan Chōga	Sanshikan of Ryukyu; 1750 - 1752	Succeeded by Yonabaru Ryōchō
