= Tasato Chōchoku =

Ryukyuan bureaucrat (1703–1773)

Tasato Pekumi Chōchoku (田里 親雲上 朝直; 8 May 1703 – 29 October 1773) also known by his Chinese style name Shō Shun (向 俊), was an aristocrat-bureaucrat of Ryukyu Kingdom.

Tasato was a younger brother of Kochinda Chōei. He was also a playwright, and known for writing kumi odori. Three plays by Tasato survive today, and are still performed. These three plays are: Banzai Katakiuchi (万歳敵討), Ufugusuku Kuzure (大城崩) and Gishin Monogatari (義臣物語). They are known today as Chōchoku no Sanban (朝直の三番, "The Chōchoku Three Plays") or just Sanban (三番, "The Three Plays").
