= Miyahira Ryōtei =

Ryukyuan bureaucrat

- 宮平 良廷

sanshikan of Ryukyu
- In office 1755–1782
- Preceded by: Yonabaru Ryōchō
- Succeeded by: Ie Chōboku

Personal details
- Chinese name: Ba Sentetsu (馬 宣哲)
- Rank: Ueekata

Miyahira Ueekata Ryōtei (宮平 親方 良廷; ? – ?), also known by his Chinese style name Ba Sentetsu (馬 宣哲), was a bureaucrat of the Ryukyu Kingdom.

Ryōtei was born to an aristocrat family called Ba-uji Miyahira Dunchi (馬氏宮平殿内). He served as a member of sanshikan from 1755 to 1782. During his term, he put forward a proposals for make the first statutory law in Ryukyuan history together with his two colleges, Wakugawa Chōkyō and Yonabaru Ryōku, and the sessei Yuntanza Chōkō in 1775. This proposal was approved by King Shō Boku. The law was completed in 1786.

Miyahira was also the eboshioya (烏帽子親) of Crown Prince Shō Tetsu.

Political offices
Preceded by Yonabaru Ryōchō	Sanshikan of Ryukyu; 1755 - 1782	Succeeded by Ie Chōboku
