= Ie Chōjo =

Ryukyuan bureaucrat (died 1745)

- 伊江 朝叙

sanshikan of Ryukyu
- In office 1720–1745
- Preceded by: Katsuren Seiyū
- Succeeded by: Fukuyama Chōken

Personal details
- Born: Unknown
- Died: 9 July 1745
- Parent: Ie Chōfu (father)
- Chinese name: Shō Wasei (向 和声)
- Rank: Ueekata

Ie Ueekata Chōjo (伊江 親方 朝叙; ? – 9 July 1745), also known by Nishihira Ueekata Chōjo (西平 親方 朝叙) and his Chinese style name Shō Wasei (向 和声), was a politician and bureaucrat of Ryukyu Kingdom.

Chōjo was the fourth son of Ie Chōfu (伊江 朝敷). He was also the originator of the aristocrat family Shō-uji Ie Dunchi (向氏伊江殿内).

King Shō Kei dispatched Prince Goeku Chōkei (越来 朝慶, also known as Shō Sei 尚 盛) and him in 1718 to celebrate Tokugawa Yoshimune succeeded as shōgun of the Tokugawa shogunate. They sailed back in the next year.

He served as a member of sanshikan from 1720 to 1745.

Political offices
Preceded by Katsuren Seiyū	Sanshikan of Ryukyu; 1720–1745	Succeeded by Fukuyama Chōken
