= Yuntanza Seishō =

Ryukyuan bureaucrat (1556–1632)

- 読谷山 盛韶

sanshikan of Ryukyu
- In office 1611–1623
- Preceded by: Jana Ueekata
- Succeeded by: Nakijin Sōnō

Personal details
- Born: 1556
- Died: 1632 (aged 75–76)
- Children: Uezu Seishō (son)
- Chinese name: Mō Hōchō (毛 鳳朝)
- Rank: Ueekata

Yuntanza Ueekata Seishō (読谷山 親方 盛韶; 1556 – 1632), also known by his Chinese style name Mō Hōchō (毛 鳳朝), was a bureaucrat of the Ryukyu Kingdom.

Yuntanza Seishō was the fifth head of the aristocrat family called Mō-uji Tomikawa Dunchi (毛氏富川殿内). He was appointed as Kane bugyō (金奉行, "Magistrate of metallurgy") in 1592.

In the spring of 1609, Satsuma invaded Ryukyu and captured the strategically important Nakijin Castle. He went there to request a peace negotiation together with Kikuin and Kian, but was rejected and had to return to Shuri. When Satsuma navy approached Naha harbor, he participated in negotiations for the second time but was rejected again. After King Shō Nei's surrender, he was taken to Kagoshima together with the king and a number of high officials by Satsuma troops. The king felt very depressed in the journey, and Yuntanza comforted him several times. He was appointed as a member of Sanshikan after Jana Ueekata's execution in 1611. Shimazu Yoshihiro received him, and gave him a tantō as a present.

Tsuken Seisoku (津堅 盛則, also known as Zen Kōsei 全 興盛) was good at riding horses and Jigen-ryū kendō (swordsmanship), so was intimated with Shimazu Yoshihiro. Tsuken wanted Tsuken Island as his hereditary fief, but was rejected by Yuntanza because an aristocrat owned such a big island was unprecedented and unacceptable. Tsuken began to have a grudge against him. In 1616, Uezu Seishō (上江洲 盛相), the eldest son of Yuntanza, was ordered to construct the Taba harbor (田場港) together with Tsuken and Goeku Chōshu (越来 朝首). Tsuken accused Uezu Seishō of gross misconduct. Uezu and Yuntanza were removed from their positions and lost their peerages. Heard about this incident, Shimazu Iehisa ordered them to go to Satsuma. Iehisa found Yuntanza and Uezu were innocent. They regained their positions and peerages soon.

King Shō Nei died in 1620 without heir. The king had an adopted son, Shō Kyō (尚恭, also known as Prince Urasoe Chōryō 浦添 朝良), but he was too young to succeed the throne. Yuntanza suggested that Shō Kyō's father Shō Hō should be the new king. Many ministers supported him but concerned about reaction of Satsuma. Yuntanza went to Satsuma to report this decision. Finally, Satsuma recognized Shō Hō as the new king, and dispatched a mission to celebrate his coronation.

Yuntanza retired in 1623.

Political offices
Preceded by Jana Ueekata	Sanshikan of Ryukyu; 1611 - 1623	Succeeded by Nakijin Sōnō
