= Gusukuma Seikyū =

Ryukyuan bureaucrat (1542–1612)

- 城間 盛久

sanshikan of Ryukyu
- In office 1601–1605
- Preceded by: ?
- Succeeded by: Jana Ueekata

Personal details
- Born: April 10, 1542
- Died: April 26, 1612 (aged 70)
- Children: Gusukuma Seizō (son)
- Parent: Kunigami Seijun (father)
- Chinese name: Ō Kishō (翁 寄松)
- Rank: Ueekata

Gusukuma Ueekata Seikyū (城間 親方 盛久; 10 April 1542 – 26 April 1612), also known by his Chinese style name Ō Kishō (翁 寄松), was a bureaucrat of the Ryukyu Kingdom. Gusukuma was also a famous calligrapher, he imitated the handwriting of Prince Son'en (尊円法親王), a princely priest and calligrapher of Japan during Kamakura period very well, so he got the nick name Son'en Gusukuma (尊円城間).

Gusukuma was born to an aristocrat family called Ō-uji Nagayama Dunchi (翁氏永山殿内). He was the eldest son of Kunigami Seijun. He was pro-Japanese, and was elected a member of Sanshikan in 1601, but was accused by his political opponent Jana Ueekata and removed from his position in 1605. He lost his official position and peerage, but his hereditary fief remained. He was not restored until 1610.

When Satsuma invaded Ryukyu in the spring of 1609, Gusukuma's eldest son, Gusukuma Sapeechin Seizō (城間 鎖子親雲上 盛増), joined the army led by Goeku Ueekata (越来親方) which tried to block Satsuma troops at the Taihei bridge (太平橋). Seizō was shot by a hinawajū (or arquebus) and decapitated. Ryukyuan soldiers were shocked and fled.

After King Shō Nei's surrender, Gusukuma was taken to Kagoshima together with the king and a number of high officials by Satsuma troops. He regained his peerage in 1610, and returned to Ryukyu together with the king in 1611. He died in the next year.

Gusukuma Seikyū
Preceded by Kunigami Seijun	Head of Ō-uji Nagayama Dunchi; 1580 - 1612	Succeeded by Gushikawa Seikei
Political offices
Preceded by ?	Sanshikan of Ryukyu; 1601 - 1605	Succeeded by Jana Ueekata
