= Tomikawa Seikei =

Ryukyuan bureaucrat (1832–1890)

- 富川 盛奎
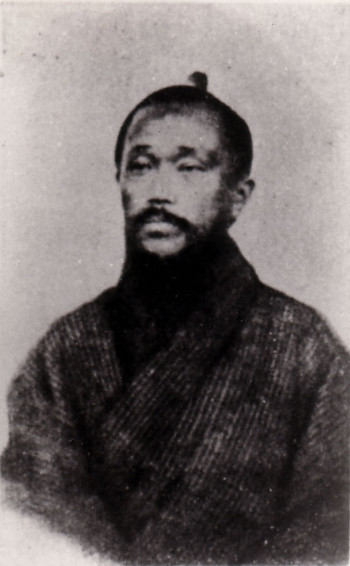

sanshikan of Ryukyu
- In office 1875–1879
- Preceded by: Giwan Chōho
- Succeeded by: title abolished

Personal details
- Born: 28 November 1832 Ryukyu Kingdom
- Died: July 1890 (aged 57) Fuzhou, Qing China
- Chinese name: Mō Hōrai (毛 鳳来)
- Rank: Ueekata

Tomikawa Ueekata Seikei (富川 親方 盛奎; 28 November 1832 – July 1890), also known by his Chinese style name Mō Hōrai (毛 鳳来), was a politician and bureaucrat of the Ryukyu Kingdom.

Seikei was born to an aristocrat family called Mō-uji Tomikawa Dunchi (毛氏富川殿内). In 1875, Sanshikan Giwan Chōho came under attack because of his pro-Japanese foreign policy and was forced to resign from public office. Seikei was selected as his successor. Unlike many Ryukyuan politicians, Seikei was neither pro-Japanese nor pro-Chinese.

Ryukyu had to break off diplomatic relations with Qing China under the pressure of Imperial Japan in 1876. Seikei went to Tokyo in 1878; he and his colleague Yonabaru Ryōketsu contacted envoys of Western countries and tried to get them involved, but there was little response. Two members of Sanshikan were gone to Japan and it was hard to manage internal affairs with only one Sanshikan. King Shō Tai had to choose Ikegusuku Anyū (池城 安邑, also known as Mō Zōkō 毛 増光), a former member of Sanshikan, to act on behalf of them in their absence.

Ryukyu was annexed by Japan in 1879, and later Japan declared the creation of Okinawa Prefecture. Because of his high prestige among Ryukyuan bureaucrats, Tomikawa Seikei was appointed an adviser of Okinawa Prefecture together with his college Urasoe Chōshō. But both of them wanted to restore the Ryukyu Domain. Seikei fled to Fuzhou together with Ō Taigyō (王 大業, also known as Kokuba Pekumi 国場 親雲上) in 1882. He went to Beijing, met Li Hongzhang several times, and submitted numerous petitions to Zongli Yamen asking for help on behalf of the kingdom. Though there was little response, he refused to give up. He became blind in his later years, and died in China.

== See also ==
- Kōchi Chōjō
- Rin Seikō
- Yoshimura Chōmei

Political offices
Preceded by Giwan Chōho	Sanshikan of Ryukyu; 1875 - 1879	title abolished
