= Ikegusuku Anki =

Ryukyuan bureaucrat (1829–1877)

- 池城 安規
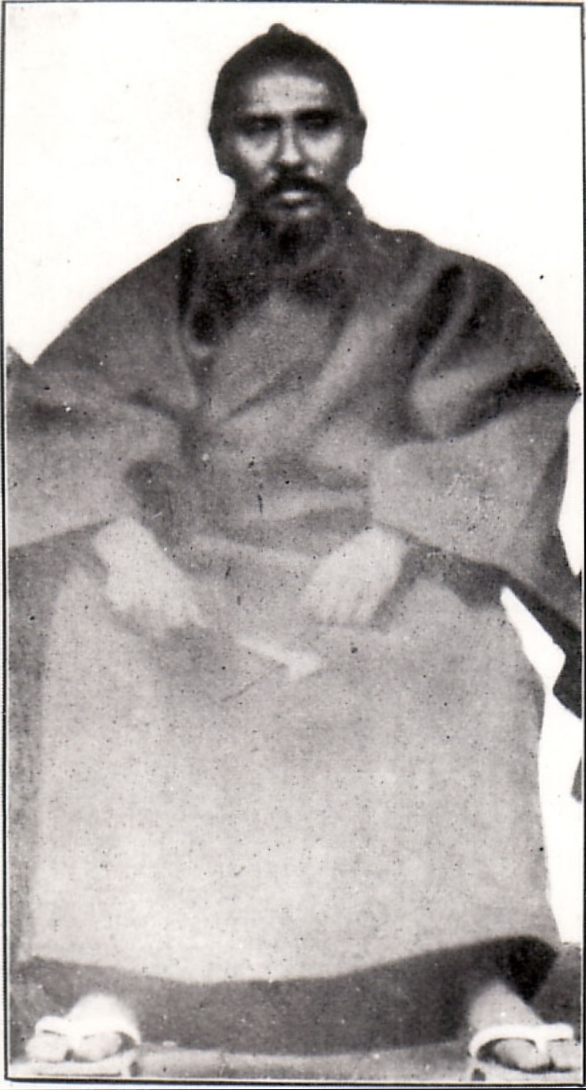

sanshikan of Ryukyu
- In office 1873–1877
- Preceded by: Kawahira Chōhan
- Succeeded by: Yonabaru Ryōketsu

Personal details
- Born: 1829 Ryukyu Kingdom
- Died: 30 April 1877 (aged 47–48) Tokyo, Empire of Japan
- Children: Ikegusuku Ansei
- Parent: Ikegusuku Anyū (father)
- Chinese name: Mō Yūhi (毛 有斐)
- Rank: Ueekata

Ikegusuku Ueekata Anki (池城 親方 安規; 1829 – 30 April 1877), also known by his Chinese style name Mō Yūhi (毛 有斐), was a politician and bureaucrat of Ryukyu Kingdom.

Anki was born to an aristocrat family called Mō-uji Ikegusuku Dunchi (毛氏池城殿内). He was the 15th head of Ikegusuku Dunchi, and his father Ikegusuku Anyū (池城 安邑, also known as Mō Zōkō 毛 増光), was a Sanshikan from 1848 to 1862.

Anki was selected as a member of the Sanshikan in 1873. In 1876, Ryukyu had to break off diplomatic relations with Qing China under the pressure of Imperial Japan. Anki led a mission to Tokyo to complaint with it (Yonabaru Ryōketsu, Kōchi Chōjō, Kyan Chōfu, Uchima Chōchoku and Ishatō Seiei as assistant), but Japanese ignored.

In the year 1877, Anki became seriously ill. He sent Kōchi Chōjō back to Ryukyu, suggested that Ryukyu should seek for China's help. Not long after he died in Tokyo, his body was returned to Shuri.

Ikegusuku Anki
Preceded by Ikegusuku Anyū	Head of Mō-uji Ikegusuku Dunchi	Succeeded by Ikegusuku Ansei
Political offices
Preceded by Kawahira Chōhan	Sanshikan of Ryukyu; 1873 - 1877	Succeeded by Yonabaru Ryōketsu
