= Katsuren Seiyū =

Ryukyuan bureaucrat (died 1719)

- 勝連 盛祐

sanshikan of Ryukyu
- In office 1716–1719
- Preceded by: Tajima Chōyū
- Succeeded by: Ie Chōjo

Personal details
- Born: Unknown
- Died: 17 July 1719
- Chinese name: Mō Ōhō (毛 応鳳)
- Rank: Ueekata

Katsuren Ueekata Seiyū (勝連 親方 盛祐; ? – 17 July 1719) also known by Bin Ueekata Seiyū (保栄茂 親方 盛祐) and his Chinese style name Mō Ōhō (毛 応鳳), was a bureaucrat of Ryukyu Kingdom.

King Shō Kei dispatched a gratitude envoy for his accession to Edo, Japan in 1714. Prince Kin Chōyū (金武 朝祐, also known by and Shō Eikyō 尚 永恭) and he was appointed as Envoy (正使, seishi) and Deputy Envoy (副使, fukushi) respectively. They sailed back in the next year.

He served as a member of Sanshikan from 1716 to 1719.

Political offices
Preceded by Tajima Chōyū	Sanshikan of Ryukyu; 1716 - 1719	Succeeded by Ie Chōjo
