= Ankon (surname) =

Ankon is a surname. Notable people with the surname include:

- Ikegusuku Ankon (1768–?), Ryukyuan bureaucrat
- Mahidul Islam Ankon (born 1999), Bangladeshi cricketer
