= Inoha Seihei =

Ryukyuan bureaucrat (1648–1700)

- 伊野波 盛平

sanshikan of Ryukyu
- In office 1694–1699
- Preceded by: Yonabaru Ryōgi
- Succeeded by: Kōchi Ryōshō

Personal details
- Born: 26 March 1648
- Died: 13 December 1700 (aged 52)
- Parent: Inoha Seiki (father)
- Chinese name: Mō Kokusei (毛 克盛)
- Rank: Ueekata

Inoha Ueekata Seihei (伊野波 親方 盛平; 26 March 1648 – 13 December 1700), also known by his Chinese style name Mō Kokusei (毛 克盛), was a bureaucrat of the Ryukyu Kingdom.

Inoha Seihei was the eldest son of Inoha Seiki. He was also the second head of an aristocrat family called Mō-uji Inoha Dunchi (毛氏伊野波殿内). Inoha Seihei was a smart man and appeared in many Okinawan shibai (沖縄芝居, "Okinawan play") and folktales in which he was known by Seimō (盛毛), Mōi Ueekata (モーイ親方) or Mōwi Ueekata (モーヰ親方).

Seihei served as a member of Sanshikan from 1694 to 1699.

Inoha Seihei
| Preceded by Inoha Seiki | Head of Mō-uji Inoha Dunchi | Succeeded by Inoha Seichū |
Political offices
| Preceded by Yonabaru Ryōgi | Sanshikan of Ryukyu; 1694 - 1699 | Succeeded by Kōchi Ryōshō |
