= Zakimi Seichin =

Ryukyuan bureaucrat (1781–1837)

- 座喜味 盛珍

sanshikan of Ryukyu
- In office 1826–1836
- Preceded by: Ie Chōan
- Succeeded by: Kanegusuku Chōten

Personal details
- Born: March 23, 1781
- Died: October 25, 1837 (aged 56)
- Chinese name: Mō Shikkō (毛 執功)
- Rank: Ueekata

Zakimi Ueekata Seichin (座喜味 親方 盛珍; 23 March 1781–25 October 1837), also known by his Chinese style name Mō Shikkō (毛 執功), was a bureaucrat of Ryukyu Kingdom.

Seichin was born to an aristocrat family, Mō-uji Zakimi Dunchi (毛氏座喜味殿内), and he was also the seventh head of this family. In 1807, he was granted Yuntanza magiri (読谷山間切, modern Yomitan) as his hereditary fief.

Seichin was dispatched as nentōshi (年頭使), a mission sent to Kagoshima each year to convey formal New Year's greetings to daimyō of Satsuma, in 1826. He served as a member of sanshikan from 1826 to 1836.

Political offices
Preceded by Ie Chōan	Sanshikan of Ryukyu; 1826–1836	Succeeded by Kanegusuku Chōten
