= Mie Castle =

Ryukyuan gusuku in Naha, Okinawa, Japan

Coordinates: 26.2138°N 127.6651°E

Mie Castle 三重城
- Naha, Okinawa
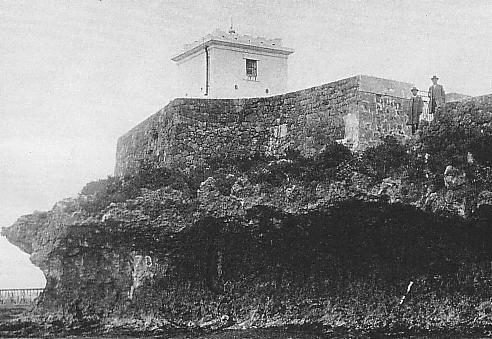
- Mie Castle before 1945

Site information
- Type: Gusuku
- Controlled by: Ryūkyū Kingdom (1546–1879); Empire of Japan (1879–1945); United States Military Government of the Ryukyu Islands (1945-1950); United States Civil Administration of the Ryukyu Islands (1950-1972); Japan (1972-present)
- Open to the public: yes
- Condition: Ruins

Location

Site history
- Built by: Shō Sei
- In use: 1546–present
- Materials: Ryukyuan limestone
- Battles/wars: Invasion of Ryukyu (1609), Battle of Okinawa (1945)

Garrison information
- Past commanders: Jana Ueekata

Mie Castle (三重城, Mie jō; Okinawan: Mii gushiku) is a Ryūkyūan gusuku in Naha, Okinawa, Japan. It is located on the northern mouth of the Kokuba River in Naha Port.

== History ==
Mie Castle was built on the northern mouth of Naha Port in 1546 by King Shō Sei. It was built to defend the port and city of Naha, alongside its sister Yarazamori Castle. Between the two castles, an iron chain boom-net could be drawn up to deny ships access to the harbor. Mie Castle, although the smaller of the two, was armed with 7–9 cm cannons. The defenders were also armed with pikes and native-made hand cannons. These defenses were intended for use against pirates, however they proved successful in driving away the fleet of the Satsuma during their 1609 invasion. The castle would continue to be used for anti-piracy, however it became generally used by civilians for seeing ships' departures.

Originally, the castle was built in the middle of the water, with a long causeway connecting it to the mainland. Over time however, sediment became deposited between the causeway and the land to the north until the causeway served as the coast. After the Ryukyu Kingdom was annexed by Japan in 1879, a watchtower was built on the castle. Today, a Japan Coast Guard watchtower stands on the site, although the site itself is open to the public.
