= Anki (Finnish company) =

Finnish rug manufacturer

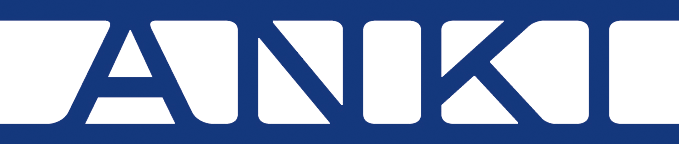
- Type: Private company
- Industry: Rug manufacture
- Founded: 1968
- Headquarters: Helsinki, Finland; Headquarters and Store; Kaavi, Finland; Factory
- Key people: Peggy Björnberg; Oscar Paul, Charlotta Björnberg-Paul (2012-)
- Products: Handmade rugs
- Website: ankirugs.com?lang=en

Anki is a Finnish manufacturer of rugs. It was founded in 1968 by Anja Harju and Eevi-Kirsti Järvelä in Kaavi, Finland.

In 1989 Peggy Björnberg bought the company and opened Anki Shop in the center of Helsinki. Oscar Paul bought the business in 2011.

== Anki Rug ==
Anki rug is made out of natural raw materials. Company uses cotton that has been flawed for clothing, but can still be used for making handmade rugs. Every sheet of cotton is individually ripped by hand depending on the customer's choice of pattern. The width of the strips vary from one centimeter to eight centimeters depending on the choice of pattern.

Linen warp is a key raw material in every Anki rug. Historically Nordic rugs have been woven with strong linen warp.

The largest hand-woven Anki rug measures 14 m^{2} (c. 150 ft^{2}).

In 2016 Anki Online Shop launched a unique online rug design tool for customers around the world.
