= Yuwan Ufunushi =

Tribal chief in the Amami Islands (died 1537)

Yuwan Ufunushi (与湾大親; Amami: ユアン ウフヌシ, ? – 1537) was a tribal chief of Amami Ōshima, an island in the Amami Islands archipelago currently controlled by Japan.

According to Chūzan Seifu, Yuwan was given the title of Ufunushi (大親, "Great Chief") by king Shō Sei. He served the Ryukyu Kingdom loyally. However, many chiefs disliked him; they reported to the royal government that Yuwan was planning a revolt. The king sent the Ryukyuan army, which landed on the island in 1537. Yuwan was forced to commit suicide.

He had a son named Nukanakagusuku (糠中城). When his father died, Nukanakagusuku was captured and brought to Shuri Castle. Later, Yuwan was proven innocent, and Nukanakagusuku's son Urasoe Ryōken became the originator of Ba-uji Oroku Dunchi (馬氏小禄殿内), which was one of the "Five Aristocratic Families"(五大名門) in Ryukyuan history.
