= Gusukuma Shūshin =

Ryukyuan bureaucrat (1507–1585)

Gusukuma Ueekata Shūshin (城間 親方 秀信; 1507 – 1585), also known by his Chinese style name Katsu Kashō (葛 可昌), was a bureaucrat of the Ryukyu Kingdom.

In the summer of 1555, King Shō Sei became seriously ill. The king ordered three members of Sanshikan, Gusukuma Shūshin, Kunigami Keimei and Aragusuku Anki, to assist the Crown Prince Shō Gen. But Gusukuma and Kunigami broke their promises, they wanted to install Prince Shō Kanshin (尚 鑑心) instead of Shō Gen. Aragusuku stood in the audience hall with a naginata in his hand, and called on all ministers to comply with the will. Finally, Shō Gen became the new king successfully. Gusukuma and Kunigami were exiled to Iheya Island and Kume Island in 1559, respectively. They lost official position and peerage and were forbidden to come back to Shuri until their political opponent Aragusuku died 1567. He regained his peerage and was given Jana village (謝名) of Chatan magiri (北谷間切) as his new hereditary fief.
