= Ancon (Pontus) =

Town in ancient Pontus

Coordinates: 41°22′26″N 36°37′54″E

Ancon or Ankon (Ancient Greek: Ἀγκών) was a populated place of ancient Pontus, on the Black Sea and on the coast road east of Amisus. It was on a headland and bay both of the same name. It is mentioned by Gaius Valerius Flaccus in his Argonautica, after the Iris, as if it were east of the mouth of that river. Apollonius Rhodius simply speaks of it as a headland.

Its site is located at mouth of the Yeşilırmak (the ancient Iris) in Asiatic Turkey.
