= Aragusuku Anki =

Ryukyuan bureaucrat (died 1567)

- 新城 安基

sanshikan of Ryukyu
- In office ?–?
- Preceded by: ?
- Succeeded by: Urasoe Ryōken

Personal details
- Born: Unknown
- Died: June 6, 1567
- Children: Ikegusuku Antō (son)
- Parent(s): Shō Shin (father?); Gibo Ōamoshirare (mother)
- Childhood name: Shutarugani (小太郎金)
- Chinese name: Mō Ryūgin (毛 龍唫)
- Rank: Ueekata
- Nickname: Ufu Aragusuku (大新城)

Aragusuku Ueekata Anki (新城 親方 安基; Unknown – 1567) was a politician and bureaucrat of the Ryukyu Kingdom. He was also known by Ufu Aragusuku (大新城), and his Chinese style name, Mō Ryūgin (毛 龍唫). His mother was a Noro. According to legend, Aragusuku was a love child of King Shō Shin.

In the summer 1555, King Shō Sei became seriously ill. The king ordered three ministers, Aragusuku Anki, Kunigami Keimei (国頭 景明, also known by Wa Imi 和 為美) and Gusukuma Shūshin (城間 秀信, also known by Katsu Kashō 葛 可昌), to assist the Crown Prince Shō Gen. But after the king's death, Kunigami and Gusukuma broke their promises and wanted to install other the prince, Shō Kanshin (尚 鑑心), as the new king instead of Shō Gen. They said that Shō Gen was too sickly to succeed the throne, and many ministers supported them. It made Aragusuku very angry. He stood in the audience hall, with a naginata in his hand, and said that Shō Gen was the eldest son of the Queen Umimajingani Aji-ganashi, so he should be the new king because of the primogeniture. Kunigami and Gusukuma were afraid of him and never said a word. All ministers agreed with him. Finally, Shō Gen ascended to the throne successfully. In the year 1559, Aragusuku exiled Kunigami to Kume Island and Gusukuma to Iheya Island.

Aragusuku Anki
title created	Head of Mō-shi Ikegusuku Dunchi ? － 1567	Succeeded by Ikegusuku Antō
Political offices
Preceded by ?	Sanshikan of Ryukyu ? - ?	Succeeded by Urasoe Ryōken
