= Ikegusuku Ankon =

Ryukyuan bureaucrat

- 池城 安昆

sanshikan of Ryukyu
- In office 1823–1829
- Preceded by: Tamagusuku Seirin
- Succeeded by: Ginowan Chōkon

Personal details
- Born: 19 October 1768
- Died: Unknown
- Chinese name: Mō Teijō (毛 廷勷)
- Rank: Ueekata

Ikegusuku Ueekata Ankon (池城 親方 安昆; 19 October 1768 – ?), also known by his Chinese-style name Mō Teijō (毛 廷勷), was a bureaucrat of the Ryukyu Kingdom.

Ikegusuku Ankon was the eleventh head of an aristocrat family called Mō-uji Ikegusuku Dunchi (毛氏池城殿内).

He was sent to China together with Tei Kokutei (鄭 国鼎) to request for King Shō Kō's investiture in 1804. Later, he served as a member of sanshikan from 1823 to 1829.

He was also the eboshioya (烏帽子親) of King Shō Iku.

Ikegusuku Ankon
Preceded by Ikegusuku Ansoku	Head of Mō-uji Ikegusuku Dunchi	Succeeded by Ikegusuku An'iku
Political offices
Preceded by Tamagusuku Seirin	Sanshikan of Ryukyu; 1823 - 1829	Succeeded by Ginowan Chōkon
