= Sanshikan =

Government body of the Ryūkyū Kingdom

The Sanshikan (三司官 sanshikwan), or Council of Three, was a government body of the Ryūkyū Kingdom, which originally developed out of a council of regents.

== History ==
It emerged in 1556, when the young Shō Gen, who was mute, ascended to the throne of Ryūkyū. The council of regents that formed in order to handle this challenge and manage the country on the king's behalf soon grew into an established and powerful government organ. Shō Gen died in 1571, but the Council remained, acting alongside the successive kings in managing the affairs of government. In fact, the Articles Subscribed to by the King's Councillors, which bound the royal government in loyalty and servitude to the Japanese daimyō of Satsuma, explicitly prohibit the king from "entrust[ing] the conduct of public affairs in the islands to any persons other than San-shi-kuan".

Over time, the Sanshikan eclipsed the power and prestige of the sessei, a post which is often translated as "prime minister," and which served as chief royal advisor. Candidates to join the Council of Three had to live in Shuri, the capital, and had to pass tests of both merit and birth; they had to be of proper aristocratic heritage, and to pass tests of knowledge of literature, ethics, and other classical Chinese subjects. These exams were very much akin to those taken by scholar-bureaucrats in China, but were less strict.

The council, and sessei, worked alongside the heads of various administrative departments who were known as the Council of Fifteen when assembled. The Fifteen advised the higher-ranking officials on policy, and made recommendations to fill vacancies in the administration.

The Sanshikan was dismantled along with the rest of the royal government when Ryūkyū was formally annexed by Meiji Japan in the 1870s. Members of Ryūkyū's aristocratic class were allowed to maintain some of their prestige and privileges, but even members of the council were only afforded the equivalent of the sixth rank in the Japanese Imperial Court structure.

== List of Sanshikan ==
=== Uncategorized ===
Name	In office	Kings
Yoasutahemaushikakokauchinoōyakumohi 世アスタヘマウシカ子カウチノ大ヤクモヒ	?-?	Shō Shin
Yoasutahemiyaheiōyakumohimaikusakako 世アスタヘミヤ平大ヤクモヒマイクサカ子	?-?	Shō Sei
Yoasutahekauchinoōyakumohitarukako 世アスタヘカウチノ大ヤクモヒタルカ子	?-?	Shō Sei
Yoasutahekusukunoōyakumohimaikusa 世アスタヘクスクノ大ヤクモヒマイクサ	?-?	Shō Sei
Sanshikan Takushi Daijin 三司官沢子大臣	?-?	Shō Gen
Mō Bunei Takushi Ueekata Seiri 毛文英 沢岻 親方 盛里	? - 1526	Shō Shin, Shō Sei
Ba Shiryō Kunigami Ueekata Seiin 馬思良 国頭 親方 正胤	?-1537	Shō Shin, Shō Sei
Yō Taikaku Yamauchi Ueekata Shōshin 楊太鶴 山内 親方 昌信		Shō Sei
Ma Bodo Ōzato Ueekata Seigyō 麻勃都 大里 親方 盛行	?-1546	Shō Sei
Go Keigen Kunigami Ueekata Sengen 呉啓元 国頭 親方 先元	?-1549	Shō Sei
Tō Gensai Kochinda Ueekata Seigu 東元宰 東風平 親方 政供	?-1560	Shō Sei
In Tatsuro Gusushi Ueekata Yōken 殷達魯 宜寿次 親方 庸憲		Shō Sei
Boku Gentoku Ikegusuku Ueekata Shōshi 穆源徳 池城 親方 昌氏		Shō Sei, Shō Gen
Ba Juntoku Kunigami Ueekata Seikaku 馬順徳 国頭 親方 正格		Shō Gen
Hō Tokushin Ganaha Ueekata Jogen 封徳新 我那覇 親方 助元		Shō Sei
Wa Imi Kunigami Ueekata Keimei 和為美 国頭 親方 景明	?-1559	Shō Sei, Shō Gen
Katsu Kashō Gusukuma Ueekata Shūshin 葛可昌 城間 親方 秀信	?-1559	Shō Sei, Shō Gen
Mō Ryūgin Aragusuku Ueekata Anki 毛龍唫 新城 親方 安基		Shō Gen
Mō Ren Ikegusuku Ueekata Antō 毛廉 池城 親方 安棟	?-1579	Shō Gen, Shō Ei
Ō Jushō Kunigami Ueekata Seijun 翁寿祥 国頭 親方 盛順	?-1580	Shō Gen, Shō Ei
Mō Genryū Kunigami Ueekata Seimai 毛元龍 国頭 親方 盛埋	1580-?	Shō Ei
Kin Kokutei Gushichan Ueekata Nōan 金国鼎 具志頭 親方 能安	?-1593	Shō Ei, Shō Nei
Mō Ryūbun Tomigusuku Ueekata Seishō 毛龍文 豊見城 親方 盛章	1583-1604	Shō Ei, Shō Nei
Go Seisai Kunigami Ueekata Senji 呉世済 国頭 親方 先次	?-1599	Shō Nei

=== Chūkaban (丑日番) ===
Name	In office	Kings
Ō Kishō Gusukuma Ueekata Seikyū 翁寄松 城間 親方 盛久	1601-1605	Shō Nei
Tei Dō Jana Ueekata Rizan 鄭迵 謝名 親方 利山	1606-1611	Shō Nei
Mō Hōchō Yuntanza Ueekata Seishō 毛鳳朝 読谷山 親方 盛韶	1611-1623	Shō Nei, Shō Hō
Mō Kijin Nakijin Ueekata Sōnō 孟帰仁 今帰仁 親方 宗能	1622-1629	Shō Hō
Ba Shōren Katsuren Ueekata Ryōkei 馬勝連 勝連 親方 良継	1629-1643	Shō Hō, Shō Ken
Ba Kami Ōsato Ueekata Ryōan 馬加美 大里 親方 良安	1643-1652	Shō Ken, Shō Shitsu
Shō Kokuyō Chatan Ueekata Chōchō 向国用 北谷 親方 朝暢	1652-1666	Shō Shitsu
Mō Kokutō Gushichan Ueekata Antō 毛国棟 具志頭 親方 安統	1666-1675	Shō Shitsu, Shō Tei
Shō Mizai Goeku Ueekata Chōsei 向美材 越来 親方 朝誠	1675-1683	Shō Tei
Ō Jigi Inamine Ueekata Seihō 翁自儀 稲嶺 親方 盛方	1683-1696	Shō Tei
Shō Seishun Nakada Ueekata Chōjū 向世俊 仲田 親方 朝重	1696-1702	Shō Tei
Mō Kiryū Shikina Ueekata Seimei 毛起龍 識名 親方 盛命	1702-1712	Shō Tei, Shō Eki
Ō Jidō Ishadō Ueekata Seifu 翁自道 伊舎堂 親方 盛富	1712-1721	Shō Kei
Shō Ryūyoku Ufugusuku Ueekata Chōshō 向龍翼 大城 親方 朝章	1722-1723	Shō Kei
Mō Shōshō Mabuni Ueekata Ansei 毛承詔 摩文仁 親方 安政	1723-1725	Shō Kei
Mō Heijin Misato Ueekata Anman 毛秉仁 美里 親方 安満	1725-1735	Shō Kei
Shō Joshū Shikina Ueekata Chōei 向汝楫 識名 親方 朝栄	1735-1745	Shō Kei
Shō Tokukō Ginowan Ueekata Chōga 向得功 宜野湾 親方 朝雅	1745-1750	Shō Kei
Mō Kyōken Zakimi Ueekata Seishū 毛恭倹 座喜味 親方 盛秀	1750-1752	Shō Kei
Ba Genretsu Yonabaru Ueekata Ryōchō 馬元烈 与那原 親方 良暢	1752-1754	Shō Boku
Ba Sentetsu Miyahira Ueekata Ryōtei 馬宣哲 宮平 親方 良廷	1755-1782	Shō Boku
Shō Tenteki Ie Ueekata Chōkei 向天廸 伊江 親方 朝慶	1782-1801	Shō Boku, Shō On
Shō Bunryū Kyan Ueekata Chōchō 向文龍 喜屋武 親方 朝昶	1801-1805	Shō On, Shō Sei, Shō Kō
Ba Isai Yonabaru Ueekata Ryōō 馬異才 与那原 親方 良応	1805-1820	Shō Kō
Ō Kōretsu Ishadō Ueekata Seigen 翁宏烈 伊舎堂 親方 盛元	1821-1828	Shō Kō
Ba Tokubō Yonabaru Ueekata Ryōkō 馬徳懋 与那原 親方 良綱	1828-1848	Shō Kō, Shō Iku, Shō Tai
Mō Zōkō Ikegusuku Ueekata Anyū 毛増光 池城 親方 安邑	1848-1862	Shō Tai
Shō Yūkō Giwan Ueekata Chōho 向有恒 宜湾 親方 朝保	1862-1875	Shō Tai
Mō Hōrai Tomikawa Ueekata Seikei 毛鳳来 富川 親方 盛奎	1875-1879	Shō Tai

=== Shikaban (巳日番) ===
Name	In office	Kings
Shō Ritan Urasoe Ueekata Chōshi 向里端 浦添 親方 朝師	?-1611	Shō Nei
Mō Hōgi Ikegusuku Ueekata Anrai 毛鳳儀 池城 親方 安頼	1611-1624	Shō Nei, Shō Hō
Kin Ōshō Gushichan Ueekata Anshi 金応照 具志頭 親方 安之	1624-1627	Shō Hō
Mō Taiun Tomigusuku Ueekata Seiryō 毛泰運 豊見城 親方 盛良	1627-1642	Shō Hō, Shō Ken
Shō Kokuki Kunigami Ueekata Chōki 向国噐 国頭 親方 朝季	1643-1654	Shō Ken, Shō Shitsu
Ba Hōki Kanegusuku Ueekata Ryōsei 馬逢熙 兼城 親方 良正	1654-1665	Shō Shitsu
Mō Taiei Inoha Ueekata Seiki 毛泰永 伊野波 親方 盛紀	1665-1688	Shō Shitsu, Shō Tei
Mō Kokuzui Sadoyama Ueekata Anji 毛国瑞 佐渡山 親方 安治	1688-1693	Shō Tei
Ba Teishun Yonabaru Ueekata Ryōgi 馬廷駿 与那原 親方 良義	1693-1694	Shō Tei
Mō Kokusei Inoha Ueekata Seihei 毛克盛 伊野波 親方 盛平	1694-1699	Shō Tei
Ba Teiki Kōchi Ueekata Ryōshō 馬廷噐 幸地 親方 良象	1700-1710	Shō Tei, Shō Eki
Shō Genryō Tajima Ueekata Chōyū 向元良 田島 親方 朝由	1710-1716	Shō Eki, Shō Kei
Mō Ōhō Katsuren Ueekata Seiyū 毛応鳳 勝連 親方 盛祐	1716-1719	Shō Kei
Shō Wasei Ie Ueekata Chōjo 向和声 伊江 親方 朝叙	1720-1745	Shō Kei
Shō Kentoku Fukuyama Ueekata Chōken 向倹徳 譜久山 親方 朝見	1745-1755	Shō Kei, Shō Boku
Mō Bunwa Urasoe Ueekata Anzō 毛文和 浦添 親方 安蔵	1755-1759	Shō Boku
Mō Genyoku Ikegusuku Ueekata Anmei 毛元翼 池城 親方 安命	1760-1769	Shō Boku
Ba Kokuki Yonabaru Ueekata Ryōku 馬国噐 与那原 親方 良矩	1769-1796	Shō Boku, Shō On
Ba Kokugi Kōchi Ueekata Ryōtoku 馬克義 幸地 親方 良篤	1796-1798	Shō On
Mō Kokutō Takehara Ueekata Anshitsu 毛国棟 嵩原 親方 安執	1798-1811	Shō On, Shō Sei, Shō Kō
Ba Ōshō Oroku Ueekata Ryōwa 馬応昌 小禄 親方 良和	1811-1818	Shō Kō
Ō Teitō Tamagusuku Ueekata Seirin 翁廷棟 玉城 親方 盛林	1818-1823	Shō Kō
Mō Teijō Ikegusuku Ueekata Ankon 毛廷勷 池城 親方 安昆	1823-1829	Shō Kō
Shō Teikai Ginowan Ueekata Chōkon 向廷楷 宜野湾 親方 朝昆	1829-1835	Shō Kō
Mō Ishin Kochinda Ueekata Ando 毛惟新 東風平 親方 安度	1836-1839	Shō Iku
Ba Inchū Oroku Ueekata Ryōkyō 馬允中 小禄 親方 良恭	1839-1847	Shō Iku
Mō Kōtoku Zakimi Ueekata Seifu 毛恒徳 座喜味 親方 盛普	1847-1858	Shō Tai
Shō Jorei Fukuyama Ueekata Chōten 向汝礪 譜久山 親方 朝典	1858-1871	Shō Tai
Shō Rinshi Kawahira Ueekata Chōhan 向麟趾 川平 親方 朝範	1871-1873	Shō Tai
Mō Yūhi Ikegusuku Ueekata Anki 毛有斐 池城 親方 安規	1873-1877	Shō Tai
Ba Kensai Yonabaru Ueekata Ryōketsu 馬兼才 与那原 親方 良傑	1877-1879	Shō Tai

=== Yūkaban (酉日番) ===
Name	In office	Kings
Mō Ryūgin Aragusuku Ueekata Anki 毛龍唫 新城 親方 安基	?-?	Shō Gen
Ba Ryōsen Urasoe Ueekata Ryōken 馬良詮 浦添 親方 良憲	?-1566	Shō Gen
Ba Seiei Nago Ueekata Ryōin 馬世栄 名護 親方 良員	1566-1592	Shō Gen, Shō Ei, Shō Nei
Ba Ryōhitsu Nago Ueekata Ryōhō 馬良弼 名護 親方 良豊	1592-1614	Shō Nei
Mō Keiso Tomigusuku Ueekata Seizoku 毛継祖 豊見城 親方 盛続	1614-1622	Shō Nei, Shō Hō
Shō Kakurei Kunigami Ueekata Chōchi 向鶴齢 国頭 親方 朝致	1622-1635	Shō Hō
Shō Kakusen Urasoe Ueekata Chōri 向鶴躚 浦添 親方 朝利	1636-1638	Shō Hō
Shō Hōgen Ginowan Ueekata Seisei 章邦彦 宜野湾 親方 正成	1641-1652	Shō Ken
Shō Seibun Mabuni Ueekata Chōi 向成文 摩文仁 親方 朝維	1654-1670	Shō Ken, Shō Shitsu, Shō Tei
Mō Kokuchin Ikegusuku Ueekata Anken 毛国珍 池城 親方 安憲	1670-1690	Shō Tei
Mō Kenryū Takehara Ueekata An'i 毛見龍 嵩原 親方 安依	1690-1697	Shō Tei
Mō Tensō Ikegusuku Ueekata An'i 毛天相 池城 親方 安倚	1699-1710	Shō Tei, Shō Eki
Ba Kenzu Nago Ueekata Ryōi 馬獻図 名護 親方 良意	1710-1728	Shō Eki, Shō Kei
Sai On Gushichan Ueekata Bunjaku 蔡温 具志頭 親方 文若	1728-1752	Shō Kei
Shō Ketsu Kochinda Ueekata Chōei 向傑 東風平 親方 朝衛	1752-1765	Shō Boku
Shō Hōten Wakugawa Ueekata Chōkyō 向邦鼎 湧川 親方 朝喬	1765-1778	Shō Boku
Shō Kōki Fukuyama Ueekata Chōki 向宏基 譜久山 親方 朝紀	1778-1798	Shō Boku, Shō On
Ba Bunzui Yonabaru Ueekata Ryōtō 馬文瑞 与那原 親方 良頭	1798-1803	Shō On, Shō Sei
Mō Kōkoku Sadoyama Ueekata Anshun 毛光国 佐渡山 親方 安春	1803-1815	Shō Kō
Shō Shōkun Ie Ueekata Chōan 向承訓 伊江 親方 朝安	1815-1826	Shō Kō
Mō Shikkō Zakimi Ueekata Seichin 毛執功 座喜味 親方 盛珍	1826-1836	Shō Kō
Shō Kan Kanegusuku Ueekata Chōten 向寛 兼城 親方 朝典	1836-1839	Shō Iku
Shō Ryōhitsu Kuniyoshi Ueekata Chōshō 向良弼 国吉 親方 朝章	1840-1851	Shō Iku, Shō Tai
Shō Kōkun Sakuma Ueekata Seimō 章鴻勲 佐久真 親方 正孟	1852-1854	Shō Tai
Shō Tōseki Kōchi Ueekata Chōken 向統績 幸地 親方 朝憲	1854-1857	Shō Tai
Ba Kokushō Oroku Ueekata Ryōchū 馬克承 小禄 親方 良忠	1857-1859	Shō Tai
Ba Chōtō Yonabaru Ueekata Ryōkyō 馬朝棟 与那原 親方 良恭	1859-1871	Shō Tai
Mō Inryō Kamegawa Ueekata Seibu 毛允良 亀川 親方 盛武	1871-1872	Shō Tai
Shō Kyoken Urasoe Ueekata Chōshō 向居謙 浦添 親方 朝昭	1872-1879	Shō Tai
