= Ichiki Shirō =

Japanese photographer (1828–1903)

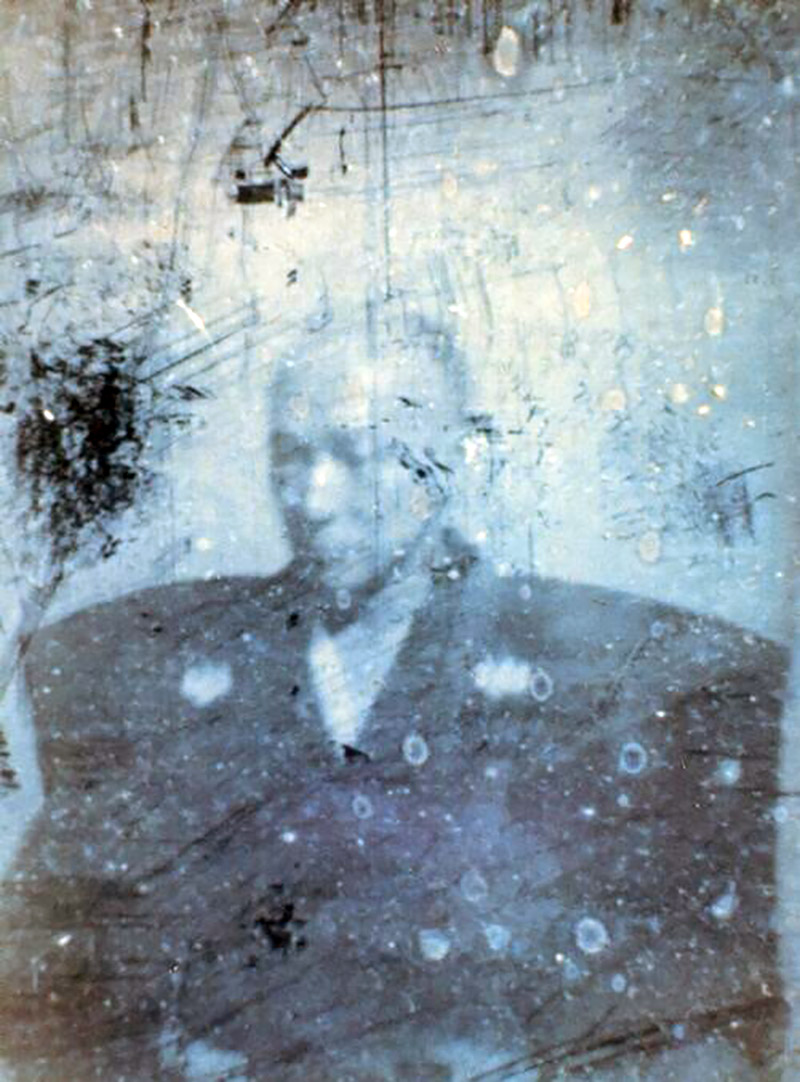
Ichiki's daguerreotype of Shimazu Nariakira, the earliest surviving Japanese photograph

Ichiki Shirō (市来 四郎; January 29, 1828 – February 12, 1903) was a pioneering Japanese photographer.

Ichiki was born in Satsuma Province (now Kagoshima Prefecture) in Kyūshū on 24 December 1828. He excelled in the study of topics related to gunpowder production in the Takashima-ryū school of gunnery. This talent was recognized by Shimazu Nariakira, the daimyō of Satsuma, who selected Ichiki to be one of his personal retainers. In 1848, Shimazu obtained the first daguerreotype camera ever imported into Japan. Ever fascinated by Western technology, he ordered his retainers (including Ichiki) to study it and produce working photographs. Due to the limitations of the lens used and the lack of formal training, it took many years for a quality photograph to be created, but on 17 September 1857, Ichiki created a portrait of Shimazu in formal attire. All this was recorded in detail in Ichiki's memoirs, which were compiled in 1884.

This photograph became an object of worship in Terukuni jinja after Shimazu's death, but it later went missing. Lost for a century, the daguerreotype was discovered in a warehouse in 1975 and was later determined to be the oldest daguerreotype in existence that was created by a Japanese photographer. For this reason, it was designated an Important Cultural Property by the government of Japan in 1999, the first photograph so designated.
