= Kokuba River =

River in Japan

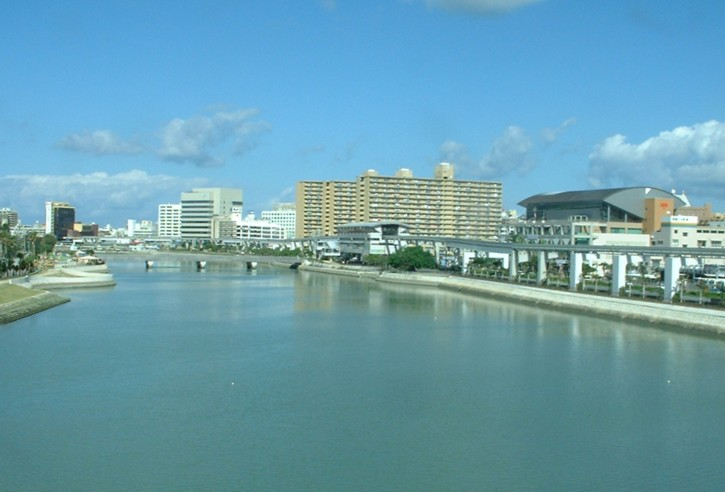

- Location within Japan

Physical characteristics
- Mouth: East China Sea

The Kokuba River (国場川, Kokuba-gawa; Okinawan: Kukuba-gāra) is a river in Naha, Okinawa, and is the hydrographic resource for domestic urban fresh water. A number of geographical places on Okinawa bear its name, such as Lake Man Park (漫湖公園) and Kokuba Danchi (国場団地). The river flows into the East China Sea.

== Poisoning ==
The river and people living around it suffered when pentachlorophenol herbicides were dumped into the river, obtained from the U.S. military by a civilian company in 1971, when it was still a US territory. Some 30,000 Okinawans had used the river for water supply, which was halted when school children came down with abdominal pain and nausea. Okinawa continues to suffer from extremely elevated levels of dioxins far beyond allowed limits, from the areas in and surrounding its US military bases, which are adjacent urban population centers, despite decades of denials and cleanup refusals by US officials.
