= Jana Ueekata =

Ryukyuan bureaucrat (1549–1611)

Tei Dō
- 鄭 迵
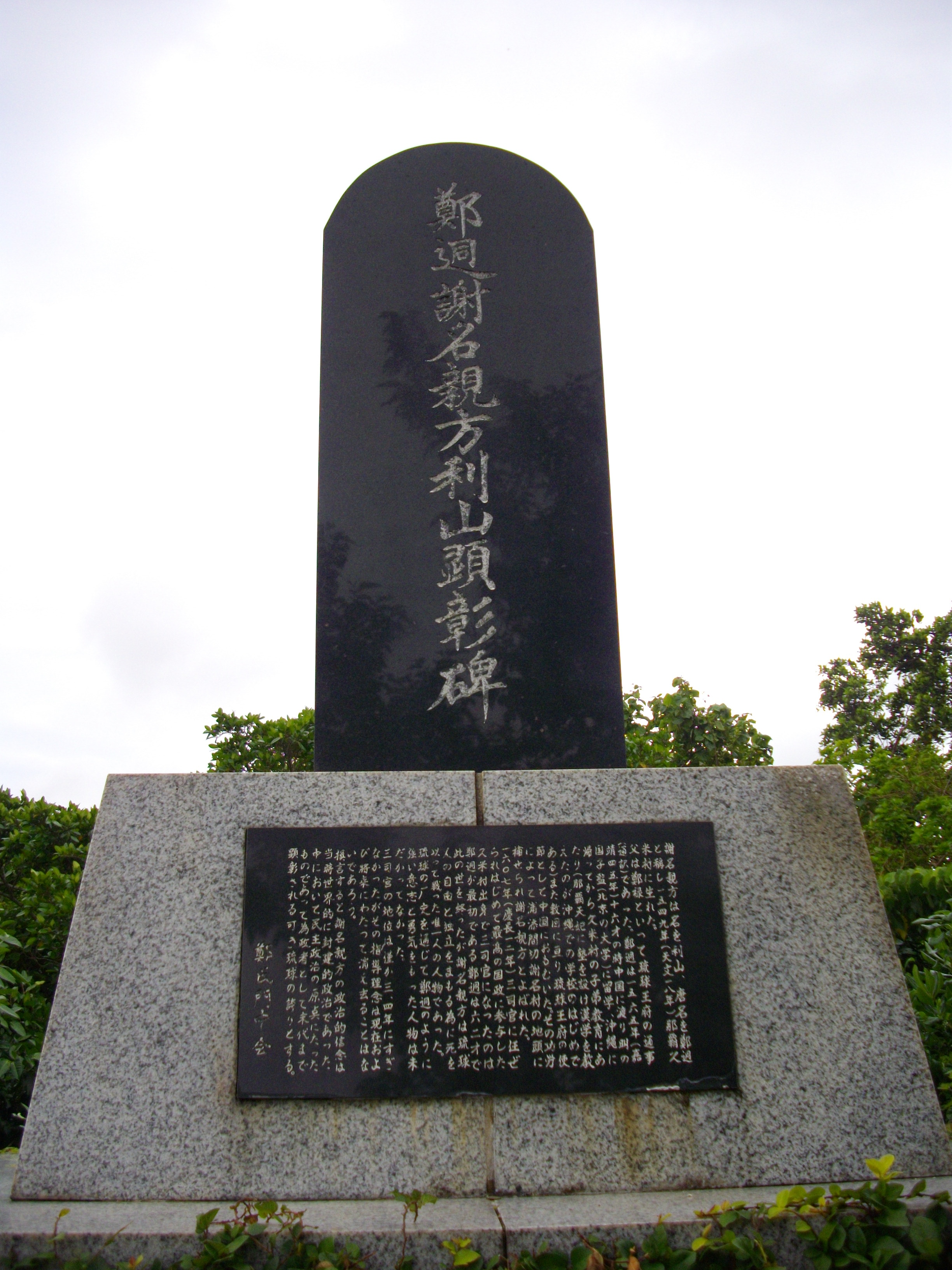
- Monument to Jana Ueekata in Naha, Okinawa

sanshikan of Ryukyu
- In office 1606–1611
- Preceded by: Gusukuma Seikyū
- Succeeded by: Yuntanza Seishō

Head of Kumemura
- In office 1580–1611
- Preceded by: unknown
- Succeeded by: Sai Ken

Personal details
- Born: 1549 Kumemura, Ryukyu Kingdom
- Died: October 24, 1611 (aged 61–62) Kagoshima, Satsuma Domain, Japan
- Japanese name: Jana Rizan (謝名 利山)
- Rank: Ueekata

Jana Ueekata Rizan (謝名 親方 利山) (1549–1611), also known by the Chinese-style name Tei Dō (鄭迵) (pinyin Zheng Dong), was a Ryukyuan aristocrat and bureaucrat in the royal government of the Ryukyu Kingdom. A member of the Sanshikan, the king's closest advisors, Rizan was the only Ryukyuan official to refuse to recognize the suzerainty of Japan's Satsuma Domain over the kingdom; he was executed as a result.

"Jana Ueekata" is actually a title, not a name, reflecting that Rizan was of ueekata rank, and assigned to the region or territory of Jana. This name structure, along with the fact that he possessed a separate, Chinese-style, name (Tei Dō) was typical of the Ryukyuan aristocracy.

== Biography ==
Rizan was, like most officials in the royal government, originally from Kumemura, a Chinese colony and the primary center of learning in the Ryukyu Kingdom. Having been chosen to start on the track to becoming a bureaucrat, he traveled to China to study at the age of 16, remaining at the Imperial Academy in Beijing for six years. He would return there a number of times over the course of his career, heading tribute missions and being involved in other diplomatic activities. In 1606, at the age of 57, he became a member of the Sanshikan, the king's closest advisors.

The court at this time was split between pro-Chinese and pro-Japanese factions; Jana Ueekata was strongly pro-Chinese, and it is said he behaved rudely to Japanese envoys from Satsuma. When Toyotomi Hideyoshi, through agents of Satsuma, demanded that the Kingdom supply forces and supplies to aid in his invasions of Korea, King Shō Nei ignored the demand, largely upon the advice of Jana Ueekata.

In 1602, a Ryukyu ship was washed ashore in the Sendai domain, and was repatriated in 1603 by the order of Ieyasu Tokugawa . After that, a messenger to thank Ieyasu was often requested. However Ryukyu officials did not show any gratuity to Tokugawa Shogunate.
Ryukyu was invaded in 1609 by forces from the Japanese feudal domain of Satsuma, nominally in response to this and other refusals of Tokugawa Shogunate demands to show gratuity with a courtesy manner.

Rizan oversaw the defense of Mie Castle in Naha harbor and successfully repelled an initial Japanese landing there. After the fall of Shuri Castle, the royal palace, and the surrender of King Shō Nei, Rizan was taken captive along with the king and a number of other officials. They were brought to Kagoshima, the capital of Satsuma Domain, and then to Sunpu, where they met with the retired former shōgun Tokugawa Ieyasu, and were forced to sign a number of vows of fealty and allegiance to the Shimazu clan lords of Satsuma. Refusing to do this, Rizan was decapitated.

There is anecdotes about Rizan and karate saying it took a number of men to overcome his resistance and successfully execute him.

Political offices
Preceded by Gusukuma Seikyū	Sanshikan of Ryukyu; 1606 - 1611	Succeeded by Yuntanza Seishō
