= Ueekata =

Okinawan noble title

Ueekata (親方), in the Okinawan language, was the highest rank in the yukatchu aristocracy of the former Ryukyu Kingdom (modern-day Okinawa, Japan), though it was still below the aji nobility. Members of the Council of Three (三司官, Sanshikan), a very high-ranking governmental body, were chosen from among the ueekata.

Ueekata rank was generally obtained as the last step in a progression from shii (子) rank to satonushi (里之子), then to peekumi (親雲上), and finally to ueekata. As with other Ryukyuan aristocratic titles, a member would often be referred to by their title, along with an associated placename. For example, royal government official Tei Dō (1549-1611) is equally well known by the title Jana Ueekata, or "ueekata of Jana," Jana (謝名) being an area (specifically, an azana) within what is today the city of Ginowan, Okinawa.

Holders of ueekata rank wore purple hachimachi headbands, the color being a symbol of rank.
