= Writing in the Ryukyu Kingdom =

The Ryukyu Kingdom (1372–1879) on Okinawa Island used various writing conventions, all of which were markedly different from spoken registers. A unique feature of Ryūkyū's writing conventions is that in the Old Ryūkyū period (?–1609), it developed a predominantly kana writing convention that was based on sōrō-style Written Japanese but exhibited heavy Okinawan influence. After the conquest by Satsuma Domain in 1609, however, this style of writing was replaced by sōrō-style Japanese that was written predominantly with kanji. Other than that, Okinawan features were confined to the recordings of songs to sing, poems to read aloud, and plays to perform verbally, and did not have an autonomous status as literary writing. Instead, the samurai class of the kingdom was aligned with the literary tradition of Japan that was established during the Heian period.

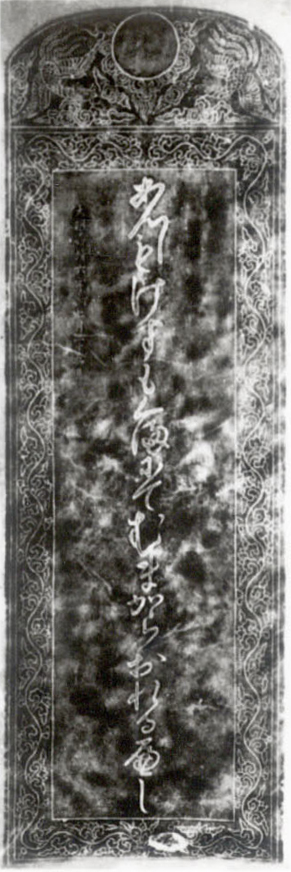
Rear side of the Sōgen-ji geba-hi (1527).

== Predominantly kana writings of Old Ryūkyū ==
It is not clear when and how writing systems were introduced to Okinawa Island. Modern scholars generally speculate that Zen Buddhist monks brought kana from Japan to Okinawa Island. During the Muromachi period, Zen monks worked as translators, diplomats and political advisers using a network of temples that was centered in Kyoto and was extended to Okinawa Island. Writings they left on Okinawa Island in the 15th century were mostly Classical Chinese (Kanbun) stone inscriptions, but a stone epitaph was written with kana.

In the 16th century, a new style of stone inscriptions emerged, with Kanbun on one side and sōrō-style Japanese on another side. This style of writing is noted for heavy linguistic interference from Okinawan. An example of this style is the Sōgen-ji geba-hi (1527), which reads:

あんしもけすもくまにてむまからおれるへし

Translation:

Both high- and low-ranking ones shall dismount here

The first part of the inscription, anji mo gesu mo, is a characteristically Okinawan phrase. The word kuma (this place) is an Okinawan word that corresponds to Japanese koko. Verbs, in addition to nominals, exhibit Okinawan characteristics. The verb oreru was chosen instead of the Written Japanese form oriru, and it regularly corresponds to the modern Shuri speech form /uriyun/. At the same time, however, this inscription exhibits non-Okinawan features. The Okinawans would have used wote (modern Shuri speech: /wuti/) as the locative marker, but Japanese ni te was used in the inscription. The obligation marker beshi at the end of the sentence is another Written Japanese feature that was borrowed into the Shuri variety but remains rare. Overall, the Okinawan influence is so heavy that this writing style can alternatively be seen as Written Okinawan with heavy interference from Written Japanese. Nevertheless, it was markedly different from any spoken register of the day.

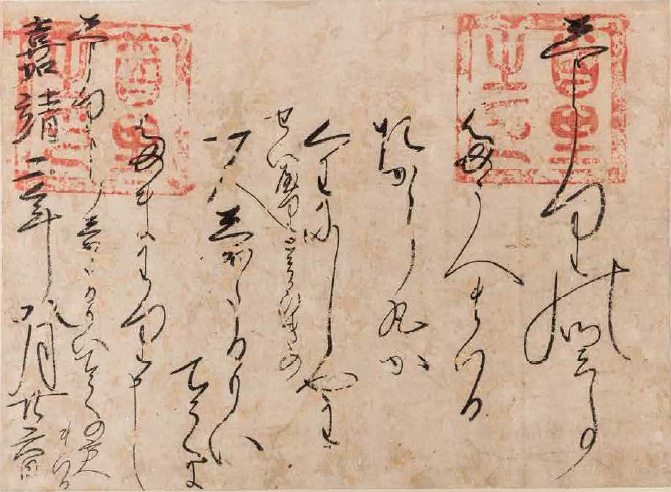
Dana Family Document dated to the twenty-sixth day of the eighth month of the second year of the Jiajing era (1523) (ICP), kept at the Okinawa Prefectural Museum & Art Museum

Another genre where this writing style was adopted was letters of appointment. In the famous Dana Documents, a collection of appointment letters preserved by a samurai family, the first appointment letter dated 1523 reads:

しよりの御ミ事
たうへまいる
たから丸か
くわにしやわ
せいやりとみかひきの
一人しおたるもい
てこくに
たまわり申候
しよりよりしおたるもい
てこくの方へまいる
嘉靖二年八月廿六日

In the document, the king appointed Shiotarumoi as a member of Takara-maru, a ship designated for a tributary mission to China. Although Okinawan flavor is non-negligible, the phrase tamawari mōshi sōrō (an honorific form of "to be given by the king's order") is a distinctive characteristic of sōrō-style Japanese.

Apart from lexical and grammatical features, a notable characteristic as a writing convention is the ratio of kana in relation to kanji. Kanji appeared very infrequently, and the number of unique kanji in the corpus is less than a hundred. This Old Ryūkyū-style writing disappeared after the conquest of the kingdom by Satsuma Domain in 1609.

== Shift to sōrō-style Written Japanese ==
Under Satsuma Domain, the style of appointment letters shifted to sōrō-style Written Japanese. The relative frequency of kanji remarkably increased during a transitional period. An example from the transitional period is the 12th appointment letter from the Dana Documents (1627):

首里乃御美事

真和志間切きま村より
知行高三捨石ハ
南風のこおりの
一人きまの大やくもいに
給申候

天啓七年六月廿二日

In the end, kana disappeared from appointment letters:

首里之御詔

真和志間切
儀間里主所者
儀間筑登之親雲上給之

康熙十年辛亥正月十七日

Although this letter was written completely with kanji, it was read aloud as sōrō-style Japanese. This writing convention was used in local administrative documents and correspondence between Ryūkyū and Satsuma. Except for the use of Chinese era names, the local administrative documents were no different from those produced in other domains under the Tokugawa shogunate.

== Recordings of oral performance ==
The Omoro Sōshi (1531–1623) was the first systematic attempt to record songs. The song at the very beginning of the anthology, for example, was:

あおりやへかふし
一 きこゑ大きみきや
おれてあすひよはれは
たいらけてちよわれ
又 とよむせたかこか
又 しよりもりくすく
又 またまもりくすく

The first line specifies the melody (the melody of Aoriyae) while the special characters "一" (start) and "又" (repeat) are used for flow control. Kana was chosen to precisely record the oral tradition. Only 51 unique kanji were used in the song part of the Omoro Sōshi. Some songs were accompanied by notes that were written in Written Japanese. Because the Omoro Sōshi was enigmatic even to the Okinawan elites of the day, a dictionary named Konkōkenshū was compiled in 1711, where each archaic word is described in Written Japanese, with extensive references to Japanese classics such as the Tale of Genji and the Tales of Ise.

In parallel with the shift in administrative documents, Ryūkyū's elite oral culture came to be recorded with the mixture of kana and kanji, under the influence of Japanese writing conventions. As a result, the relationships between spelling and pronunciation became complicated. At the time omoro songs were recorded, radical sound changes that characterize the Shuri speech and other modern South Okinawan varieties, such as vowel raising, palatalization of [k] and [g] before [i], dropping of [r] before [i] were not completed if they had started. In contrast, ryūka songs and poems and kumi odori plays have significant gaps between spelling and pronunciation. For example, the first block of a ryūka is written as:

けふのほこらしやや
kefu no hokorashiya ya

However, it is pronounced as:

kiyu nu hukurasha ya

Still, this pronunciation convention has non-negilible differences with modern colloquial speech. In the modern Shuri speech, the first word, meaning "today", is pronounced as [t͡ɕuː], not [kiju].

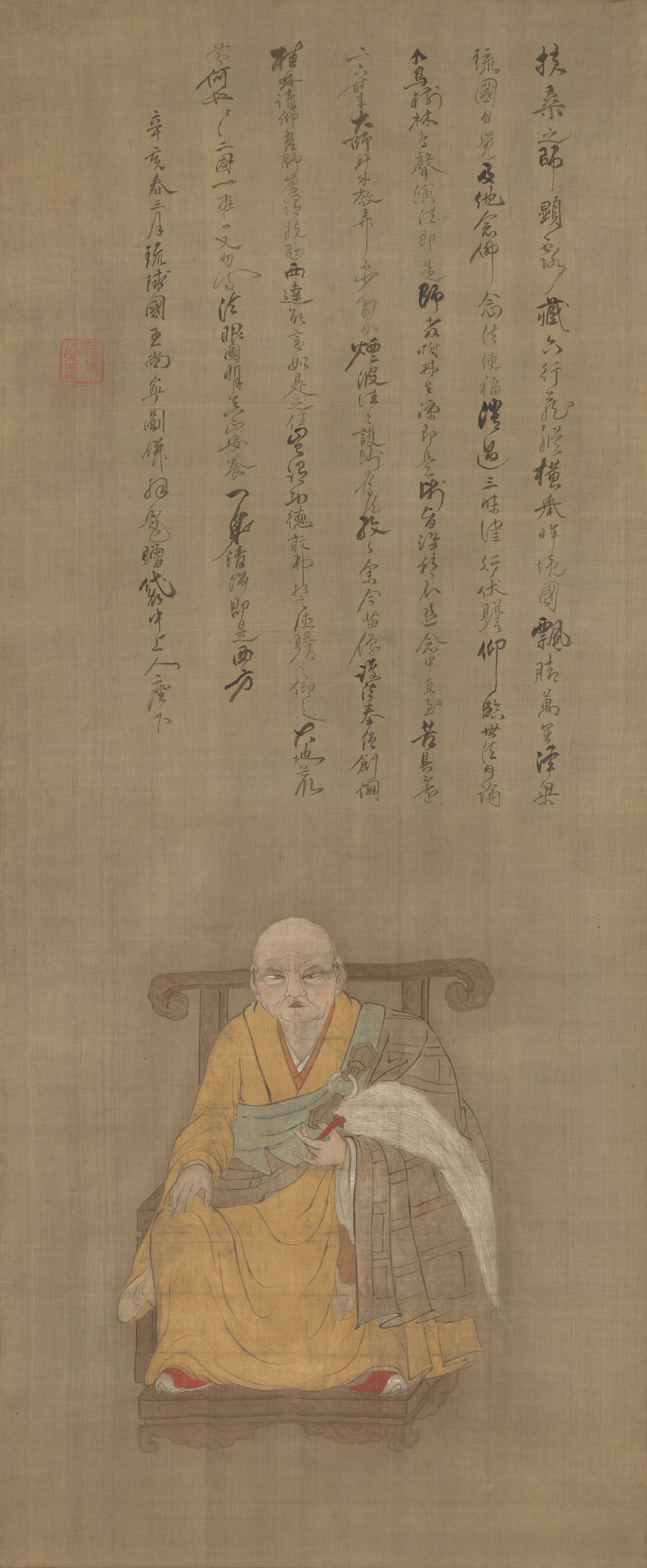
King Shō Nei's 1611 portrait of Taichū, along with an inscription, from the Kyoto temple of Dannōhōrin-ji (ja), deposited at Kyoto National Museum

== Adoption of the Japanese literary tradition ==
Instead of developing their own literary writing, the samurai class of the kingdom embraced the literary tradition of Japan. Fragmentary sources indicate that Japanese classics took a firm hold in the elite society even before Satsuma's conquest. The social lives of the elites at the very end of the Old Ryūkyū period were depicted by Taichū's Ryūkyū ōrai (early 17th century), a collection of correspondence arranged by month for the purpose of elementary education. In a letter between two ruling elites, one asked the other for copies of waka anthologies, namely, the Kokin Wakashū, the Man'yōshū, the Tales of Ise, the Shin Kokin Wakashū, and the Senzai Wakashū, in order to hold a renga (collaborative poetry) session. After the session, they played a kemari game. Kemari was taught by a member of the Asukai family, who had visited Okinawa prior to the event. One had visited Japan and learned the Ikenobō school of ikebana (flower arrangement). Apparently, the ruling elites enjoyed the complete set of Japanese high culture.

However, most extant literary works date back only to the end of the 17th century. Two notable exceptions are the Kian Nikki (early 17th century) and the Chūzan Seikan (1650). The Kian Nikki was written by Kian, a tea master from Sakai, and it is the sole extant record of Satsuma's conquest of Ryūkyū from the view point of Ryūkyū. It followed the style of gunki monogatari (war tales) and extensively copied the Tale of the Heike, the Tale of Hōgen, and the Tale of Heiji. The unprecedented event was hardly explained with Okinawa's own words. The style of war tales was adopted in a more sophisticated way by the Chūzan Seikan, Ryūkyū's first official history book written by Haneji Chōshū.

Haneji Chōshū issued a set of directives known as the Haneji shioki in 1667, where young samurai were instructed to study an array of subjects including Japanese arts and literature. Haneji's directives remained in effect for long periods of time. The testament of Aka Chokushiki (1778 and 1783), which was written in sōrō-style Japanese by a samurai of Naha, enumerated a wide range of subjects to be mastered by his young son. He was instructed to follow the Nijō school of waka by studying introductory books published in Japan. He was also expected to master the classical writing style by reading the Tales of Ise, the Tale of Genji, and the Tsurezuregusa among others.

Haneji Chōshū's policy resulted in a flood of literary works from the end of the 17th century to the early 18th century. The Omoidegusa (1700) by Shikina Seimei was a poetic diary, a genre of Japanese literature with the Tosa Nikki as a representative work. In this work, Shikina Seimei detailed his official trip to Satsuma, intermixed with waka poems. Another major genre of Japanese literature, monogatari (narrative tales), was pursued by Heshikiya Chōbin (1701–1734). He left four short tales, the Manzai, the Koke no shita, the Wakakusa monogatari, and the Hinkaki. The sole form of literary writing the Okinawan elites acquired in the end was Written Japanese.

== Kanbun kundoku ==
Since the reign of King Satto in the 14th century, the king of Ryūkyū maintained tributary relations with the emperor of China. Diplomatic duties were performed by technocrats of Kumemura, who were believed to have their roots in Fujian. Their duties covered writing of diplomatic documents in Classical Chinese and interpretation of Spoken Chinese as well as sea navigation. Since the reign of Shō Shin, however, Ryūkyū's sea trade under the disguise of tributary missions had shown a steady decline, which devastated the community of Kumemura. The population dropped and the remaining population had limited command of Chinese. In addition, Kumemura was largely isolated from the rest of the Okinawan society during the Old Ryūkyū period. In fact, most Classical Chinese stone inscriptions were written by Buddhist monks, not the people of Kumemura.

Satsuma's conquest of Ryūkyū of 1609 turned Chinese affairs into Ryūkyū's raison d'etre. The Tokugawa shogunate refused to embrace the Chinese world order and had never established diplomatic relations with China. As a result, Ryūkyū became Japan's one of four gateways to foreign countries. Under the direction of Satsuma, Ryūkyū was committed to rebuild Kumemura. In the 17th century, the samurai of Kumemura replaced Buddhist monks as the writers of stone inscriptions. The 18th century is dubbed as the "century of Kumemura". They switched from Written Japanese to Classical Chinese as the language of Ryūkyū's official books. The Chūzan Seifu, the Kyūyō, and other official books were the products of this period. However, the samurai of Kumemura were assimilated to the Okinawan society to the level that they chose sōrō-style Written Japanese for daily activities.

How Classical Chinese texts were read aloud in Okinawa is a question that attracts scholarly interest. There were two approaches in Japan: chokudoku and kundoku. Chokudoku is a way of reading Chinese texts in the original order, usually with Chinese sounds. Kundoku is an elaborate method to read Chinese texts as Japanese. While Chinese uses the SVO (Subject-Verb-Object) word order, Japanese is SOV. To cope with the ordering differences, kaeri-ten markers were added to the texts to change the word ordering to the Japanese one. While Chinese is an analytic language, Japanese is an agglutinative language with a rich set of small grammatical markers. For this reason, Chinese texts were annotated with okurigana, Japanese grammatical markers written with kana. The annotation scheme that realizes kundoku is called kunten (reading marks).

The Okinawan elites adopted the Japanese way of reading Classical Chinese. Tomari Jochiku (1570–1655), a Confucian scholar from Yakushima, is credited for introducing a style of kunten called Bunshi-ten, together with the Satsunan school of Neo-Confucianism. Bunshi-ten was developed by Tomari Jochiku's mentor, Bunshi Genshō. Tomari Jochiku brought the Four Books of Confucianism annotated with Bunshi-ten. Kundoku based on Bunshi-ten became the standard way of reading Classical Chinese in Ryūkyū. Even in Kumemura, both chokudoku and kundoku were taught in school. When Ryūkyū received Classical Chinese documents from countries under the Chinese world order (i.e., China and Korea), the samurai of Kumemura made kunten annotations to them. The government officials then read them as Japanese.

Linguistically speaking, the Okinawan varieties underwent radical sound changes in the relatively recent past, but how they affect Okinawan kundoku reading is not clear from historical sources. Higa Shunchō (1883–1977), a historian from a samurai lineage, recorded Classical Chinese education of his father's days. According to Higa, there were two varieties of kundoku: gōon kundoku and kaion kundoku. Gōon kundoku was obtained by applying the rules of regular sound correspondences and thus reflected Okinawan sounds while kaion kundoku is Japanese reading. Higa cited a famous passage of the Analects as an example:

- Original text: 有朋自遠方來不亦樂乎
- gōon kundoku: tumu ari 'inpō yui chitaru, mata tanushikarazu ya
- kaion kundoku: tomo ari enpō yori kitaru, mata tanoshikarazu ya

The students of Kumemura and would-be interpreters were taught chokudoku and gōon kundoku. The rest of the students started with gōon kundoku and then proceeded to kaion kundoku. Recalling the years of his childhood, Iha Fuyū (1876–1947) also mentioned gōon kundoku but he referred to it as shima kaigō and stated that it had attracted scorn. Higa Shunchō recalled that although his father had been unable to speak Modern Japanese, he had fully comprehended orally realized written-style Japanese. Iha Fuyū found that kaion kundoku training enabled him to smoothly adapt to Modern Written Japanese, which originated from kanbun kundoku-style Written Japanese.

== See also ==
- List of Cultural Properties of Japan - writings (Okinawa)
- Kaidā glyphs
