= Ryūka =

Ryūka (琉歌; Okinawan: Ryūka) lit. "Ryūkyū song/poem" is a genre of songs and poetry originating from the Okinawa Islands, Okinawa Prefecture of southwestern Japan. Most ryūka featured the 8-8-8-6 syllable structure.

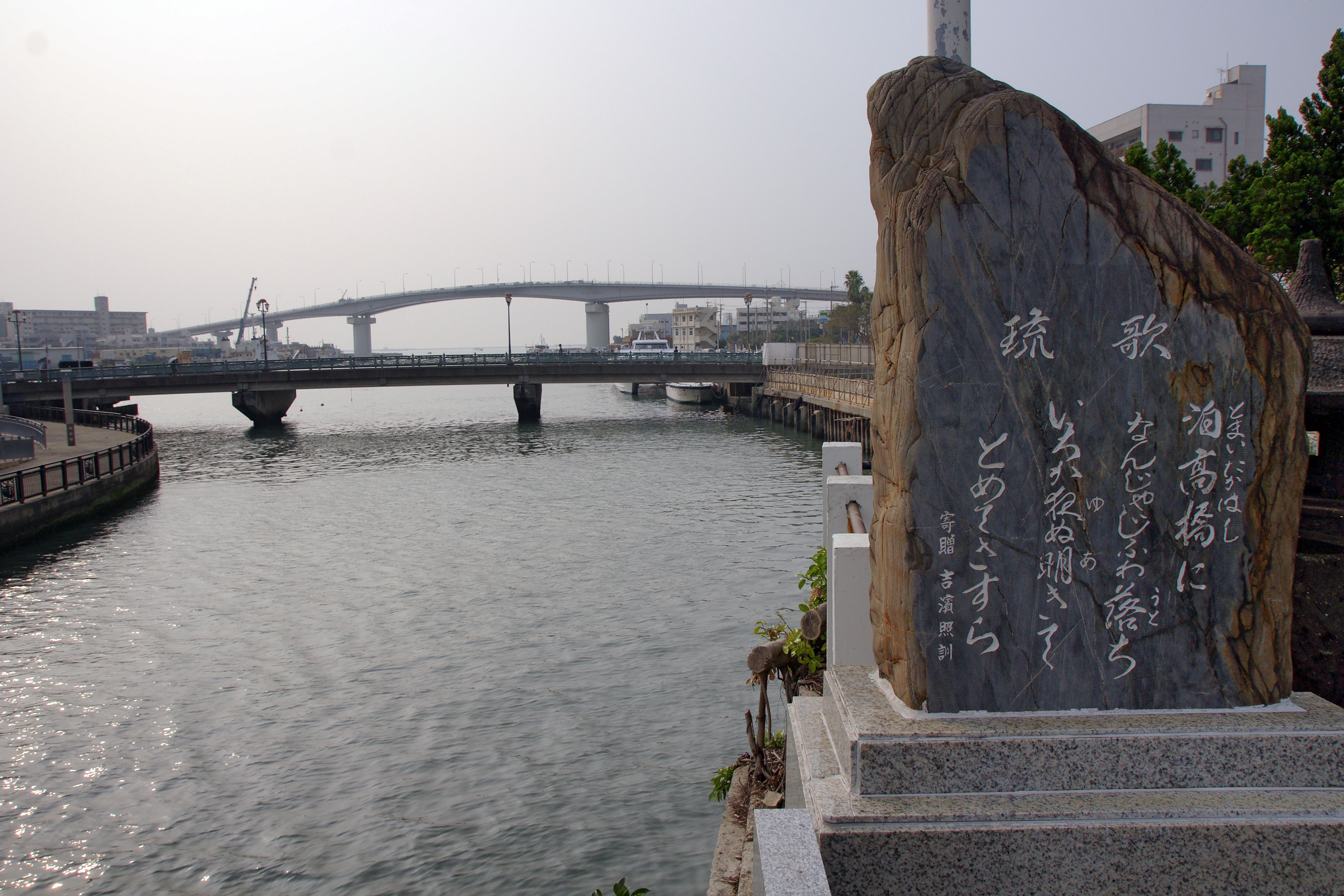
A monument of ryūka at Tomari Port

== Concepts and classification ==
The word ryūka ([ru:ka] in archaic pronunciation) was first attested in the Kon-kōken-shū (1711). The name came into use when Ryūkyū's samurai class in Shuri and Naha embraced Japanese high culture including waka. It is analogous with Japanese custom of contrasting Japanese poetry (waka or yamato-uta) with Chinese poetry (kara-uta). There is abundant evidence that ryūka was simply referred to as uta (songs and/or poems) in colloquial use.

In its original form, ryūka was songs to be sung with sanshin (shamisen), rather than poems to be read aloud. Thus it is more comparable with Japanese imayō, kinsei kouta and dodoitsu than with waka. The composers of ryūka were not only those in the upper class, but also included a girl who was sold to the red-light district called Yoshiya Chiru and a woman farmer of passion called Onna Nabe. However, the male members of the samurai class in Shuri and Naha started to read ryūka just like waka. They hold utakai, or a gathering for reading a collection of poems on a common theme, for both ryūka and waka. It is no wonder that famous ryūka poets like Heshikiya Chōbin and Motobu Chōkyū were also waka poets.

Researchers disagree on the scope of ryūka. In the narrowest definition, it only refers to songs and poems with the 8-8-8-6 syllable structure. This standard form is specifically called tanka (短歌, lit. "short song/poem"). In a slightly broader definition, ryūka also covers nakafū (仲風; Okinawan: nakafū, imafū), which typically has the 7-5-8-6 or 5-5-8-6 syllable patterns. It is a hybrid of waka (first two units) and ryūka (second two units). The invention of nakafū was traditionally attributed to the 18th century poet Heshikiya Chōbin, and it was mainly composed by the male members of the samurai class. Another form called chōka (長歌; Okinawan: chōka; lit. "long poem") is characterized by a series of 8-8 syllable patterns with a 6-syllable unit at the end. There are some 20 chōka in the records.

In the broadest definition, ryūka includes tsurane (つらね; Okinawan: chirani), kiyari (木遣り; Okinawan: chiyai) and kuduchi (口説; Okinawa : kuduchi). Tsurane shares the series of 8-8-...-6 syllable patterns with chōka. However, it is typically longer than chōka and can be seen as an extended narrative poem. Kiyari was sung by construction workers. Although the same genre exists in Japan, the Okinawan version is characterized by 8-syllable units. Kuduchi was Japanese-style songs that usually consist of a series of the 7-5 syllable pattern. It is said to have originally been performed to entertain Satsuma bureaucrats.

Okinawa shares its 8-8-8-6 syllable structure with its northern neighbor Amami, where the songs in this form are known as shima-uta and are considered a separate genre. Okinawa's southern neighbors, Miyako and Yaeyama, did not embrace ryūka. Miyako developed its own lyric songs named tōgani and shunkani while Yaeyama has tubarāma and sunkani. Unlike ryūka, they show relatively free verse forms.

== History ==
Ryūka is an innovative form that emerged relatively recently. The earliest ryūka found in the literature is of the late 17th century. However, there remains a disagreement over exactly how it evolved. Hokama Shuzen considered that the earliest form of songs were incantations that were sometimes chanted rather than were sung. From such incantations, epic songs such as Okinawa's umui and kwēna and Amami's omori and nagare emerged. Epic songs then evolved into lyric songs (feelings of individuals) including Amami's shima-uta and Okinawa's ryūka. He claimed that the development of lyrical ryūka from epic omoro happened in the 15th to 16th centuries when Okinawan people were supposedly liberated from religious bondage and began to express personal feelings. He also considered that the introduction of sanshin helped the transition from the long, relatively free verse forms to the short, fixed verse form.

Ono Jūrō also supported the staged development from epic songs to lyric songs. However, his theory is radically different from Hokama's in that the 8-8-8-6 form was formed under the influence of kinsei kouta of mainland Japan, which has the 7-7-7-5 syllable structure. He dismissed the hypothesis that the first stanza of omoro of the later stage partly showed the 8-8-8-6 pattern, which he reanalyzed as kwēna-like 5-3, 5-3, and 5-5-3. He dated the formation of ryūka to the first half of the 17th century, shortly after kinsei kouta became common in Japan.

Ryūka reached at its peak from the late 17th century to the early 19th century. While it was originally songs to be sung, the samurai class in Shuri and Naha treated them as poems to be read aloud, under the heavy influence from Japanese high culture. For its origin as songs, early ryūka anthologies were classified by melodies rather than by themes as are done for waka. The Ryūkyū daikashū (1878) adopted a hierarchical classification: melodies as the major categories and themes as minor categories. The Kokin Ryūka-shū (1895) switched to the theme-based classification. Today ryūka may be classified into 1) celebration poetry 2) seasonal or scenery poetry 3) love poetry 4) teaching poetry 5) travel poetry 6) smallpox poetry. Of these classifications, love poetry is well described in ryūka. Peculiar is the smallpox poetry; the purpose of glorification of smallpox demon is improvement from deadly infection of smallpox. There is a collection of smallpox poetry including 105 poems published in 1805.

Ryūka as poems gained a wider audience after the formal abolishment of the kingdom. Losing income and status, the former samurai class moved from Shuri and Naha to Northern Okinawa, Miyako, Yaeyama, and other regions, and spread its high culture around Okinawa Prefecture. Newspapers, which first appeared in Okinawa Prefecture in the 1890s, had readers' sections for ryūka and waka. Ryūka is popular now not only in Ryukyuan living in Okinawa Prefecture, but also in Ryukyuan who have immigrated to Peru and Hawaii.

== Writing and pronunciation ==
While Modern South Okinawan is characterized by drastic sound changes that happened in the relatively recent past, the standard reading of ryūka reflects conservative literary forms based on the Shuri dialect. Ryūka is written with a mixture of kanji and hiragana, as in Written Japanese. Spellings are even more conservative than pronunciations. As a consequence, there are substantial disparities between spelling and pronunciation.

For example, "today" is [t͡ɕuː] in the modern Shuri speech, which corresponds to [kjoː] in Japanese. However, it is pronounced [kiju] when people read ryūka. Its standard spelling is the same as that in pre-spelling-reform Written Japanese: "けふ" (transliterated as kefu).

== Examples ==
Original text	Transcription	Translation
今日の誇らしやや なをにぎゃなたてる つぼでをる花の 露きゃたごと	kijunu fukuraʃaja nawuniʒana tatiru tsibudiwuru hananu tsijuʧatagutu	The pride I feel today; What can I compare it to? The budding flowers' reception of the morning dew (unknown composer)
恩納岳あがた 里が生れ島 森も押しのけて こがたなさな	unnadaki agata satuga Nmariʒima muin uʃinukiti kugata nasana (Onna Nabe)	The village on the other side of Mount Onna is where I was born I want to push away the woods and pull it near (Onna Nabe)
及ばらぬ とめば想ひ増鏡 影やちやうも写ち 拝みほしやの	ujubarantumiba umui maʃikagami kaʒijaʧon uʧuʧi wugamibuʃanu (Yoshiya Chiru)	My lover and I are of different social positions. My affection increases like Masukagami. I would like see his face with my mirror.(Yoshiya Chiru)
枕並べたる 夢のつれなさや 月やいりさがて 冬の夜半（赤嶺親方）	makkwa narabitaru ’juminu ʧirinasaja ʧukija irisagati fujunu jafan (Akamine Ueekata)	Our pillows side-by-side; The heartlessness of my dreams The moon sets in the west a winter's midnight (Akamine Oyakata) (a coded reference to dreaming of a lover while sleeping alone in a bed set for two)
歌や三味線に 踊い跳にしちょて 清ら瘡ぬう伽 遊ぶ嬉しゃ（読み人知らず）	utaja sanʃinni ’udui haniʃiʧuti ʧuragasanu utuʒi aʃibu uriʃa (Unknown composer)	Playing Sanshin songs; Bouncing back and forth in dance The caregiver of a smallpox patient plays happily
古血わじらてど 欠きて 居やびむぬ 命のある間は 使かて たぼり(鳥刺小橋川)	Furuʧi waʒiratidu kakiti ujabimunu nuʧinu aru weedaja ʧikati taburi (Torisashi Kobashigawa)	Though the impure blood flows (due to syphilis); Please use me as long as I am alive (The composer was blamed for using broken coins)(Torisashi Kobashigawa)
三重城に登て 手拭持上げれば 走船のなれや 一目ど見ゆる	miguʃikuni nubuti tisaʒi muʧagiriba haifuninu nareja ʧumidu mijuru	I climbed to Miigusuku Castle to signal by raising a washcloth But the ship was so fast it was only visible for the blink of an eye
夜走らす船や 子の方星目当て 我生ちえる親や 我ど目当て	juruharasu funija ninufabuʃi miati wannaʧeru ujaja wandu miati (Unknown composer)	The boat sailing at night looks to the north star My mother who gave birth to me looks to me.

== See also ==
- Writing in the Ryukyu Kingdom
- Tanka (poetry)
