= Kikuin Sōi =

- 菊隠宗意
- Title: sessei (摂政); Ōzato Wōji (大里王子); Kyūyō Kokushi (球陽国師)

Personal life
- Born: Unknown
- Died: 1620

Religious life
- Religion: Buddhism
- School: Zen
- Dharma name: Kikuin Sōi

Kikuin Sōi (菊隠 宗意; ? – 1620) was a Rinzai Zen Buddhist monk of the Ryukyu Kingdom.

Kikuin was ordained as a Bhikkhu (full monk) at the Enkaku-ji temple (円覚寺) in Shuri. Later, he travelled to Japan to study Zen for over ten years. After he returned to Ryukyu, he was appointed abbot of Tennō-ji temple (天王寺). Kikuin was fluent in Japanese; he was friends of Shimazu Yoshihisa, Shimazu Yoshihiro and Shimazu Iehisa. He led missions to Satsuma Domain multiple times.

In the spring of 1609, Satsuma invaded Ryukyu and captured the strategically important Nakijin Castle. Kikuin went there to request a peace negotiation together with a Japanese tea master named Kian, but they were arrested by Satsuma troops. After the war, he was taken to Kagoshima Castle together with King Shō Nei and a number of high officials by Satsuma troops. After sessei Gushichan Chōsei died at Sunpu Castle, he served as acting sessei.

Political offices
Preceded by Gushichan Chōsei	Sessei of Ryukyu; 1611 - ?	Succeeded by Shō Hō
