= Gushichan Chōsei =

- 具志頭 朝盛

sessei of Ryukyu
- In office 1589–1610
- Preceded by: vancant (last holder: Kaiki)
- Succeeded by: Kikuin Sōi

Personal details
- Born: May 20, 1578 Shuri, Ryukyu Kingdom
- Died: August 21, 1610 (aged 32) Sunpu, Suruga Province, Japan
- Parent: Shō I (father)
- Chinese name: Shō Kō (尚 宏)
- Rank: Wōji

Gushichan Wōji Chōsei (具志頭 王子 朝盛; 20 May 1578 – 21 August 1610), also known by his Chinese style name Shō Kō (尚 宏), was a Ryukyuan prince who served as sessei, a post often translated as "prime minister", from 1589 to 1610.

Shō Kō was the second son of Shō I (Prince Yonagusuku Chōken) and Shuriōkimi Aji-ganashi. He was also the little brother of King Shō Nei.

Satsuma invaded Ryukyu in the spring of 1609. Shō Kō was taken to Sunpu together with King Shō Nei and a number of high officials by Satsuma troops. He died and was buried there.

Gushichan Chōsei
Preceded by Shō I	Head of Oroku Udun; 1589 - 1610	Succeeded by Gushichan Chōsei
Political offices
Vacant Title last held by Kaiki	Sessei of Ryukyu; 1589 - 1610	Succeeded by Kikuin Sōi
