= Hirata Masumune =

Japanese samurai

- Born: 1566
- Died: August 7, 1610 (aged 43–44)
- Era: Sengoku – early Edo

Hirata Masumune (平田 増宗; 1566 – 7 April 1610) was a Japanese samurai of the early Edo period. He was a retainer and karō in the service of the Shimazu clan of Satsuma Domain.

Hirata took part in Battle of Sekigahara. After Western Army lost the war, he saved Shimazu Yoshihiro's wife and Shimazu Iehisa's wife, let them go back to Satsuma safely.

Shimazu clan decided to invade Ryukyu Kingdom in 1609, Hirata Masumune was appointed vice general. The invasion of Ryukyu was successful, Satsuma troops captured King Shō Nei and his ministers, and took them to Kagoshima. Hirata was assassinated in 1610.

== See also ==
- Kabayama Hisataka
