= Luchu =

Luchu may refer to:

- Luchu Islands, a synonym of the Ryukyu Islands, an island chain under the administration of the Japanese government
- Luchu language, indigenous languages of the Ryukyu Islands
- Luchu Pine (Pinus luchuensis), a species of conifer in the family Pinaceae
- Luchu, an English name for the Ryukyu Kingdom

== See also ==
- Luzhu District, Taoyuan, northwestern Taiwan
