= Yamazaki Nikyū =

Japanese physician

Yamazaki Nikyū (山崎 二休; 1554 – 1631) was a Japanese physician who was active in Ryukyu Kingdom. In Ryukyuan history records, his full name was Yō-shi Yamazaki Nikyū Morizō (葉氏 山崎 二休 守三).

Yamazaki was born in Echizen Province, Japan. He heard that many Ryukyuan physicians studied high skills in Ming China, so he went to Ryukyu to study medicine. But actually, Ryukyu was lagging in the quality of their physicians. Yamazaki was regarded as a skilled physician and received rewards from the king, Shō Nei. The king later appointed him gotenyaku (御典薬, "physician of imperial bureau of medicine"), and gave him the Chinese style surname, Yō (葉).

In the spring of 1609, Satsuma invaded Ryukyu and besieged Shuri Castle. Unlike many Ryukyuan officers, Yamazaki fought bravely at the west gate and repelled the attack.

After King Shō Nei's surrender, Yamazaki was captured by Japanese samurai Hōmoto Niemon (法元 弐右衛門). Hōmoto asked him: "You are Japanese, why do you fight for Ryukyu?" He replied: "I fight for gratitude to the Ryukyuan king." Before his execution, King Shō Nei used a lot of gold, silver and jewelry to save his life. King Shō Nei was taken to Kagoshima together with a number of high officials by Satsuma troops. Yamazaki wanted to followed, but King Shō Nei refused and left him in Ryukyu.
