= Yoshiya =

- Gender: Male

Origin
- Origin: Japanese
- Meaning: Different meanings depending on the kanji used

Yoshiya (written: 佳也, 栄哉 or 代志也) is a masculine Japanese given name. Notable people with the name include:

- Yoshiya Nishizawa (西澤 代志也) (born 1987), Japanese footballer
- Yoshiya Takemura (竹村 栄哉) (born 1973), Japanese footballer

Yoshiya (written: 吉屋) is also a Japanese surname. Notable people with the surname include:

- Yoshiya Chiru (吉屋 チルー) (1650–1668), Japanese poet
- Nobuko Yoshiya (吉屋 信子) (1896–1973), Japanese writer

== See also ==
- 7257 Yoshiya, main-belt asteroid
- Joshua
