= Yoshiya Chiru =

Yoshiya Chirū
- Born: 1650; Yomitan, Okinawa
- Died: 1668 (aged 17–18); Naha, Okinawa
- Other names: Yoshiya ciruu,ciruu
- Occupations: singer,poet
- Known for: Ryuka poet

Yoshiya Chirū (吉屋ちるー) was a singer and Ryuka poet (1650?–1668?). She charmed many pechin by her literary ability and beautiful looks. A legend tells that she fell in love with the Aji of Nakazatu, but she committed suicide on hearing her freedom was bought by a rich man called Kurokuun, at age 18.

== Biography ==
Yoshiya Chiru lived during the reign of King Shōkei of Ryukyu, born into a wealthy farming family in Yomitan, Ryukyu Kingdom. She possessed a talent for singing from a young age and was a beautiful girl. Later, her family fell into poverty; her father and brothers incurred debts, her mother fell ill. At the age of eight, Yoshiya Chiru was sold to a brothel on Nakajima Island in Naha as an entertainer. Even in her youth, she possessed extraordinary talent in Ryukyu songs and was considered a poetic genius. Due to her outstanding talent and beauty, Yoshiya Chiru became a popular entertainer at the time.At sixteen, she fell in love with Lord Nakasato Anji. However, due to their vastly different social statuses, they could not marry, and Yoshiya Chiru could only express her sorrow in her poems. A wealthy merchant known as Kurokuun-dono wanted to kept Yoshiya Chiru with his gold, the brothel madam for the large sums of money also forced her. Overwhelmed with grief, Yoshiya Chiru committed suicide. Yoshiya Chiru died tragically at the young age of eighteen.

== Historicity ==
No contemporary source mentions Yoshiya, probably for her humble status. Some ryuka traditionally attributed to her are probably not her own. She is a protagonist of Koke no shita (苔の下), written in Classical Japanese, by the pro-Japanese Ryukyuan official Heshikiya Chōbin (circa 1730), where she is referred to as Yoshiya-kimi (よしや君) and is said to have been born in 1650 and died in 1668. Fuku Hiromi noted that Yoshiya means "what will be will be" in Japanese poetry, which Heshikiya was familiar with.

Kadekaru Chizuko pointed out that earlier sources did not identify the composer of poems attributed to Yoshiya today. Hokama Shuzen observed that her poems reflected waka-style artifice and thus were composed some time around the early 18th century.

== Her Ryuka ==
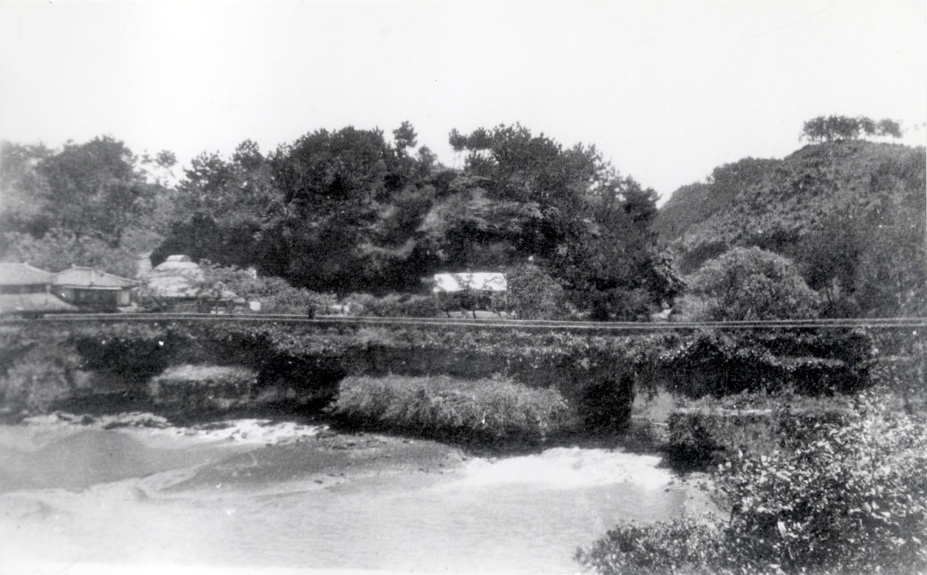
Hija Bridge in Yomitan

At age 8, she had to cross the Hija Bridge between Kadena and Yomitan to be sold to a house.

Ryukyuan language

恨む比謝橋（ひじゃばし）や 情け無（ね）ぬ人の
我身（わみ）渡さと思て 架けて置（う）ちぇら
流れゆる水に さくら花浮きて
色美（いろちゅ）らさあてど 掬くてみちゃる
寄る辺無（べね）ん物や 海士（あま）の捨て小舟
着く方ど頼む 繋ぎたぼり
たのむ夜や 更けておとずれも 無いらぬ
一人山の端の 月に向かいて

Pronunciation

Uramu Hijabashiya Nasakeeneenu Hitunu
Wamiwatasatoo Umutee Kakeeteeucheera
Nagareeyuru Mizuni Sakurabana Ukiti
Iroochurasa Ateedoo Sukuteemicharu
Yoorubeeneen Munuya Amanoo Suteekoobunee
Tukukatadoo Tanumu Tugitaboori
Tanumuyaya Fukeeteei Ootoozuren Neenun
Hityui Yamanufanu Tutini Nkati

Translation

I bear a grudge against Hija Bridge, a person with ill feeling
might construct it, in order for me to pass it
Cherry blossoms are floating on the flowing water
They are so beautiful, that I unintentionally dipped them up
There is a boat discarded by a fisherman, floating and not reaching the shore
the shore is the only safe spot. Please help me who is like the boat, without dependable persons
The promised night is passing. There is no atmosphere of his visiting me
I am alone, facing the moon rising on the edge of a mountain
