= Nakadomari (archaeological site) =

Archaeological Site in Okinawa, Japan

- 仲泊遺跡 (Japanese)
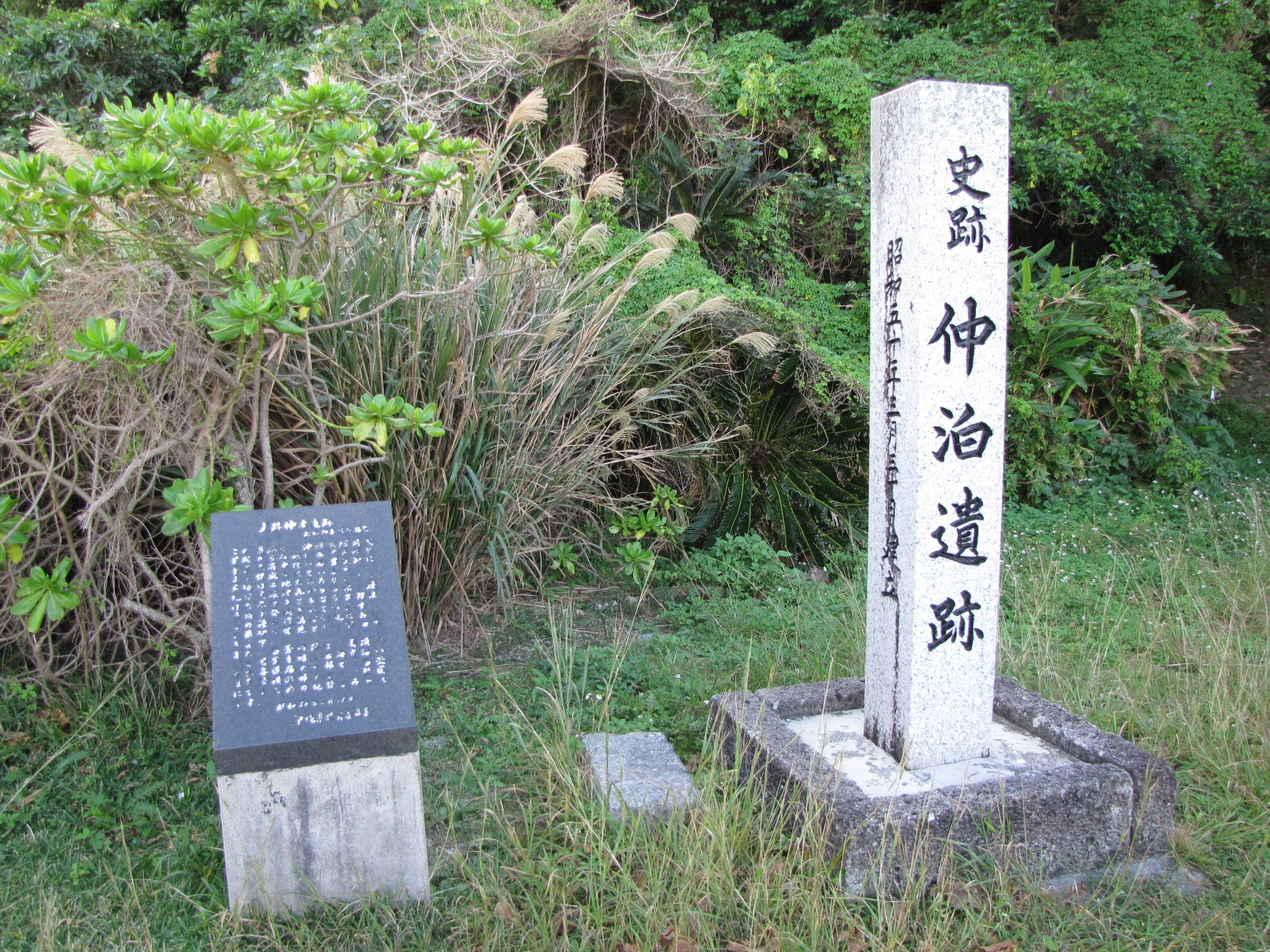
- Signs at the entrance to the site
- Interactive map of Nakadomari
- 26°26′5″N 127°47′30″E
- Periods: Kaizuka period; Early modern period
- Cultures: Ryukyu Kingdom
- Location: Onna, Okinawa

Site notes
- Excavation dates: 1974–1977
- Archaeologists: Shinjun Tawada
- Discovered: 1954

Designations
- Designation: National Historic Site

Nakadomari (Japanese: 仲泊遺跡) is an archaeological site of the prehistoric and early modern periods in Onna, Okinawa. It is a complex site that includes remains of the Early Kaizuka Period Phase IV and V and Late Kaizuka Periods, as well as of the early modern Ryukyu kingdom. It is located on a limestone outcrop about 30 m high, along the coast, near the border between Nakadomari and Yamada in Onna. A river runs from the hills behind to the sea. The site was designated and a National Historic Site in 1975

The site was excavated between 1974 and 1977. It includes four shell middens of the Kaizuka Period, some of which with dwelling remains, a cave with occupation of the Kaizuka Period, and the early modern Hiyagonbira paved road. The Kaizuka Period sites, and especially Shell Mound #4, yielded pottery sherds that became the type for the Nakadomari Pottery (Japanese: 仲泊式土器), a representative pottery type of the Early Kaizuka Period Phase IV, lithics made of obsidian imported from the Japanese island of Kyūshū, Japanese pottery of the Yayoi Period and even wooden implements, which were the first ones discovered in Okinawa for this period. Several of the sites included dwellings under rock shelters. It was at the time the first rock-shelter dwelling sites to have been found in Okinawa Island.

== Description ==
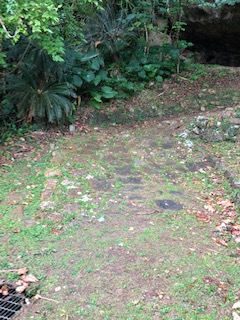
Entrance to the site

The rock shelters of Cave #1 and Shell Midden #4 included dwellings partly paved with stones, while the one of Shell Midden #3 had the remains of a simple rock shelter dwelling.

Cave #1 is located at the foot of the hill, and the interior of the cave and part of its front space were paved with slate. There was a burnt area next to the entrance interpreted as a hearth. The cave presented a complex stratigraphy with several layers of earth including charcoal. It is interpreted as a dwelling site occupied from the end of the Early Kaizuka Phase IV to the Late Kaizuka Period. Before the archaeological excavations, it was used as an exposition burial grave, and it yielded human remains, as well as stone and ceramic zushi bone containers.

The rock shelter of Shell Midden #4 was also partly paved with stones, it yielded the first examples of Nakadomari Pottery sherds, the style of which is said to have been influenced by Amami pottery. As Cave #1, it presented a complex stratigraphy with several layers of earth including charcoal, with occupations spreading from the Early Kaizuka Phase IV to the Late Kaizuka Period.

The dwelling site in Shell Midden #3, dated of the Early Kaizuka Period Phase V, makes use of a rock shelter 8 m wide and 4 m deep, that opens 2 m above ground surface in a limestone cliff. It does not show any stone pavement, but the ground had been artificially flattened, and postholes are aligned at the entrance of the rock shelter. It included a hearth circled with stones. The prehistoric occupations are dated of the Early Kaizuka Period Phases IV and V, with layers of the Late Kaizuka Period only confirmed in front of the rock shelter. It yielded pottery and a shell bracelet, as well as stone tools. A part of the site was destroyed during the Early Modern Period when the Hiyagonbira road was paved. It was also used as an exposition burial grave and a stone wall enclosed a 4 x 2 wide area. It yielded human remains, as well as stone and ceramic zushi bone containers.

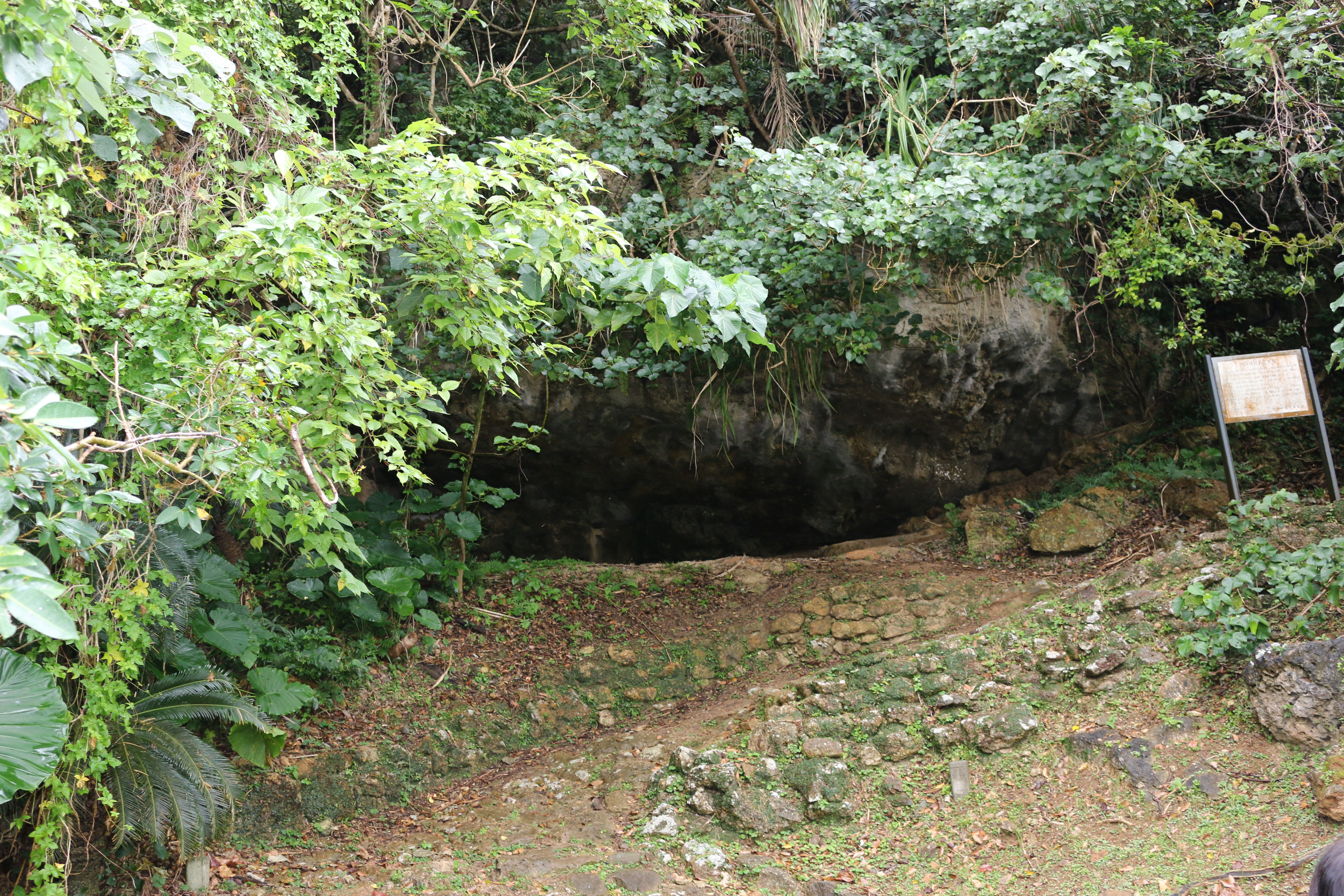
Shell midden #3

Shell Midden #2 is located at the foot of the limestone hill. It is the location that yielded the obsidian from the Japanese island of Kyūshū, with other stone implements and shell beads. Its occupation is dated of the Early Kaizuka Period Phases IV to V. Shell Midden #1 yielded one of the largest stone axes of Okinawa Prefecture (30.2 cm long for 2830 g), as well as shell tools.

The Hiyagonbira (“the hill of Hiyagon”) paved road crosses the hill. It is a part of one of the seven main roads of the Ryūkyū Kingdom that used to run from Shuri Castle, the West Coast Road. It was mainly destroyed at the end of the Meiji Period when the Japanese government developed the road system. The Hiyagonbira paved road was made by flattening artificially a part of the natural landscape. It was paved with limestone, and bordered with a stone wall on several places. It is 1.5 to 3 m wide and is conserved on a length of 174 m.

== History of discoveries and preservation ==
- 1954 Discovery of Shell Midden #1 by Shinjun Tawada.
- 1959 Discovery of Shell Midden #2 by Shinjun Tawada.
- 1973 Discovery of Shell Midden #3 by the Okinawa Prefecture Culture Office at the occasion of the extension works of National Road 58 by the Okinawa Development Ministry.
- Archaeological excavations are implement between 1974 and 1977.
- A preservation movement ensues to prevent the destruction of the site by the road extension works, led by the Okinawa Archaeological Society. The mobilisation of the whole island led to the modification of the road plans to ensure the site preservation.
- 1975, April the 7th Registration as a National Historic Site.

== See also ==
- List of Historic Sites of Japan (Okinawa)
