= Cape Manzamo =

Rock formation on Okinawa Island, Japan

Cape Manzamo (Okinawa Island)

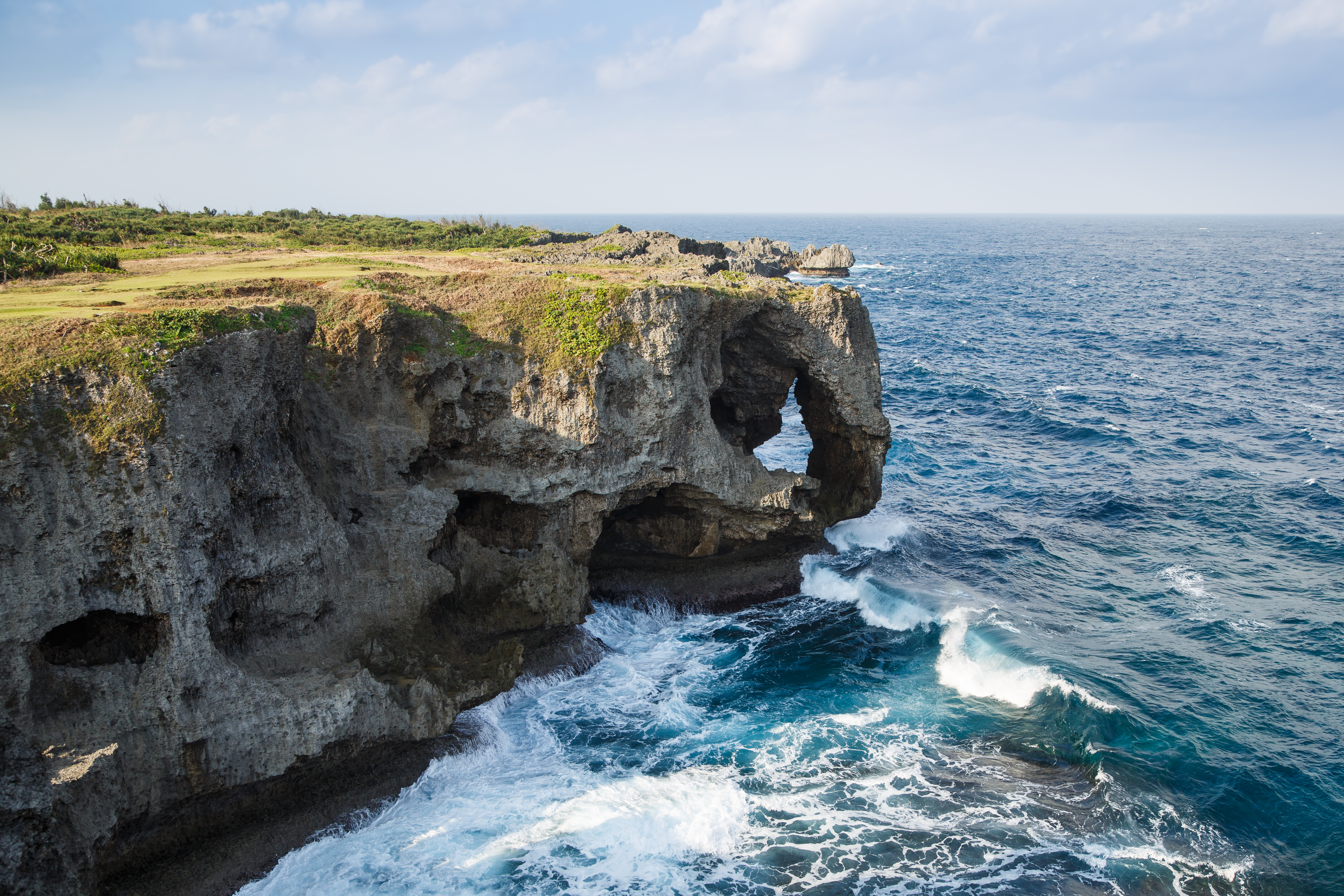
The cliff at Cape Manzamo

Cape Manzamo (万座毛, Manzamou lit. "a field for 10,000 people to sit") is a scenic rock formation on Okinawa Island, Japan. It is located near Onna Village (恩納村 Onna-son, Okinawan: Unna) in the Kunigami District of Okinawa Prefecture. Cape Manzamo is one of the most popular places among both Japanese and international travelers who visit Okinawa Island.

== Location ==
Cape Manzamo is located on the western side of Okinawa Island (26°30′28.2″N 127°51′01.4″E), facing the East China Sea. It is accessed most easily from Onna Village, which is served by public transportation buses travelling between Naha and Nago.

== Origin of the name ==
When visiting Cape Manzamo, 18th Century Ryukyuan king Sho Kei is said to have noted that the top of the cliff was big enough for 10,000 people to sit. The kanji characters of the Japanese written form of Manzamo reflect the king's expression: 万 (Man - 10,000) 座 (Za - to sit) 毛 (Mo - field). The third syllable "mo" is pronounced long, therefore Manzamo is sometimes transliterated as Manzamou (or alternately Manzamō, with the ō denoting the long vowel). Another English translation of the name is Cape Manza.

== Popularity ==
Due to its location, Cape Manzamo is facing the open East China Sea to the west. This makes it a very popular spot on Okinawa for viewing the sunset, and for taking photos of the cliff from its side facing Onna Village.

At low tide, at the bottom of the rock formation which constitutes the picturesque cliff, tidal pools are formed. Directly on the sea-facing side of these pools, there is a popular scuba-diving spot known as The Toilet Bowl.

== In popular culture ==
- Cape Manzamo is the seaside home of the kaiju King Caesar in the 1974 Godzilla film Godzilla vs. Mechagodzilla. When inactive, he sleeps in a sea cave inside one of the cliffs at the cape.
- Cape Manzamo appears in the fourth tome of Azumanga Daioh.
