= Invasion of Ryukyu =

1609 invasion by Satsuma

- Map of Ryukyu Kingdom
Date	March–May 1609
Location	Ryukyu Islands
Result	Satsuma victory
Territorial changes	Ryukyu becomes a vassal state

Belligerents
Ryukyu Kingdom	Satsuma Domain of Japan

Commanders and leaders
Shō Nei (POW); Jana Ueekata (POW); Nago Ryōhō; Urasoe Chōshi (POW); Tomigusuku Seizoku; Shō Kokushi †; Gusukuma Sapeechin †; Goeku Ueekata; Yamazaki Nikyū (POW)	Shimazu Tadatsune; Kabayama Hisataka; Hirata Masumune

Strength
Unknown; unknown number of ships	3,000 men in 100 ships

Casualties and losses
Around 1,500	Around 500

The invasion of Ryukyu (琉球侵攻, Ryūkyū Shinkō) by forces of the Japanese feudal domain of Satsuma took place from March to May of 1609, and marked the beginning of the Ryukyu Kingdom's status as a vassal state under the Satsuma domain. Former Satsuma territories that had been invaded by the Ryukyu Kingdom, such as the Amami Islands, were reintegrated into the Satsuma domain. The invasion force was met with stiff resistance from the Ryukyuan military on all but one island during the campaign. Ryukyu would remain a vassal state under Satsuma, alongside its already long-established tributary relationship with China, until it was formally annexed by Japan in 1879 as the Okinawa Prefecture.

== Etymology ==
The war was called the Disturbance of Kiyū (己酉ノ乱, Kiyū no ran), with 1609 being a kiyū year in the sexagenary cycle. It was also called the Japanese Disturbance of Kiyū (己酉倭乱, Kiyū Wa ran) by the Ryukyu Kingdom. In Japan, the war was called the Ryukyu Expansion (琉球征伐, Ryūkyū Seibatsu) or the Entry into Ryukyu (琉球入り, Ryūkyū iri) during the Edo period.

== Background ==
Satsuma's invasion of Ryukyu was the climax of a long tradition of relations between the kingdom and the Shimazu clan of Satsuma. The two regions had been engaged in trade for at least several centuries and possibly for far longer than that; in addition, Ryukyu at times had paid tribute to the Ashikaga shogunate (1336–1573) of Japan as it did to China since 1372.

In 1429, during the reign of King Shō Hashi, Ryukyu invaded Okinoerabu Island and Yoron Island. This was the first stage of Ryukyu's southward policy (南下政策) out of Okinawa island. In 1447, King Shō Shitatsu conquered Amami Oshima. In 1466, King Shō Toku attacked Kikai Island on two occasions. The fierce resistance of the islanders resulted in many casualties, but the island was finally placed under the control of the Kingdom of Ryukyu. King Shō Toku himself led 2,000 soldiers in large-scale operations but the cost of the war became a cause of domestic discontent. The Amami Islands became part of the Ryukyu Kingdom's territory from the Muromachi period onwards, along with the other Nansei Islands.

The Amami Islands (Amami Oshima, Tokunoshima, Okinoerabu Island, Kikai Island, etc.) traded with the Dazaifu, as attested as "Aakumi Island" (掩美嶋) in the Mokkan. During the Kamakura to Nanbokucho periods, Amami was under the Hojo Tokumune's property. Later Chikama-Shi (千竃氏) was reorganised as stewards (Jitō) of the Satsuma Province, a territory of Shimazu clan.

During this era, the Ryukyu kingdom expanded north and south and new territory provided a stable basis for trade in the kingdom thereafter.

In the final decades of the 16th century, the Shimazu clan, along with Toyotomi Hideyoshi, who ruled Japan from 1582 to 1598, requested or demanded various types of aid or service from the kingdom on a number of occasions. King Shō Nei (r. 1587–1620) met some of these demands. Shō Nei sent a tribute ship, the Aya-Bune, to Satsuma in February or March of 1592, and agreed to provide approximately half of his allocated burden in preparation for the invasion of Korea in 1593. However, Shō Nei also ignored many communications from Shimazu and Hideyoshi, which spurred the Shimazu, with the permission of the newly established Tokugawa shogunate (1603–1867), to invade Ryukyu in 1609, claiming it to be a punitive mission.

One of the chief events which spurred Satsuma to aggression occurred when Hideyoshi launched the first of two invasions of Korea. In 1591, Shimazu Yoshihisa said that "Hideyoshi ordered Ryukyu and Satsuma to contribute 15,000 troops in order to invade China; however, Ryukyu is a far country and Japanese military strategy is unfamiliar to your forces. I exempt you from mobilization of the troops. In exchange, however, you must supply 10 months' rations for 7,000 troops." Sho Nei supplied only half of the demanded amount in 1593.

Following Hideyoshi's death in 1598, and Tokugawa Ieyasu's subsequent rise to power, Shō Nei was asked by Satsuma to formally submit to the new shogunate, a request which was ignored. In 1603, some Ryukyu sailors were cast ashore on the coast of the Sendai domain, and Tokugawa Ieyasu sent them back to Ryukyu. The Shimazu asked Ryukyu to thank Ieyasu again, but Ryukyu ignored the request. The Shimazu then requested to launch a punitive mission against Ryukyu. Approximately 100 ships carrying roughly 3,000 soldiers concentrated at Yamakawa harbor on March 1, 1609. Ichirai Magobee, who was one of them, would write a diary documenting the expedition. The fleet left harbor on March 4, under the command of Kabayama Hisataka and Hirata Masumune.

== Campaign ==
=== Amami Island ===
The Satsuma fleet arrived at Amami Ōshima on April 7, where the Amamian people did not resist, but assisted the Satsuma army. Tameten (笠利首里大屋子為転), the chief of Kasari, was a subject of Kabayama, and called on the Amamian people to surrender. Shigetedaru (焼内首里大屋子茂手樽), the chief of Yakiuchi, supplied the Satsuma army. On April 10, Shō Nei was informed of Satsuma's landing on Amami, and he sent Ibun (天龍寺以文長老), the priest of Tenryu temple, to Amami in order to surrender, but Ibun missed the Satsuma army for unknown reasons. On April 16, 13 Satsuma ships then left for Tokunoshima in advance, and the others left Amami at 6 am on April 20.

=== Tokuno Island ===
On April 17, 13 ships arrived at Tokunoshima and dispersed. Two ships arrived at Kanaguma, but nothing happened. Eight ships arrived at Wanya. The ships were besieged all night by 1,000 people. On April 18, Satsuma troops disembarked, fired into the crowds, and killed 50 people. Three ships arrived at Akitoku, and were attacked at the water's edge by the Akitoku people. However, troops quickly fought back and killed 20–30 people. The Satsuma fleet also arrived at Akitoku at 4pm, April 20. On April 21, Kabayama left for Okierabu Island with 10 ships in advance. Others left Tokunoshima at 10am, April 24, and arrived at Okierabu at sunset. They met Kabayama and his ships there, and quickly departed for Okinawa Island.

=== Okinawa Island ===
The Satsuma fleet arrived at Unten harbor on the Motobu Peninsula of Okinawa island on April 25 at 18:00. On April 27, some disembarked. They found Nakijin Castle deserted, and set fires in several places. As soon as Shō Nei heard of Satsuma's arrival at Nakijin, he called Kikuin, the zen master, giving him a royal order: "You had lived in Satsuma for several years, so you know three lords of the Shimazu clan very well. Go and make a proposal for peace." Kikuin and his diplomatic mission, with Kian as an assistant, left the Ryukyuan royal capital, Shuri at 8am, April 26, and arrived at Kuraha at 12pm. They left Kuraha for Onna by boat. On April 27, they left Onna, and arrived at Nakijin. Kikuin parleyed with Kabayama, who then ordered peace talks at Naha.

In the early morning of April 29, the Satsuma fleet and Kikuin left Unten harbor. They arrived at Ōwan, near Yomitanzan at 6pm. The Ryukyuan Mission left immediately, and arrived at Makiminato at 10pm, where they left their boat, and arrived late at night. Kikuin reported Kabayama's order to Shō Nei, and went down to Naha in the early morning. At Ōwan, Kabayama sent some of his officers to Naha in order to fulfill his promise, while he disembarked his other men, because he heard that there was a chain at the entrance of Naha harbor. "If there is a chain, no ship can enter the harbor." Kabayama and his army then landed at Ōwan, and marched to Shuri.

At 2 PM, May 1, the Satsuma ships entered Naha harbor, and immediately held peace talks at Oyamise (親見世). At that time, there was a fire in Shuri, and Kabayama's force reacted and surged forward. Some Satsuma officers ran up to Shuri from Naha, and calmed down troops. Because Shō Nei gave Kabayama his own brother Shō Ko, and all three of his ministers as hostage, Kabayama ordered his men to return to Naha from Shuri, and all of the Satsuma army were there by 4pm, May 1. On May 4, Shō Nei left Shuri Castle, and on May 5, some Satsuma officers entered the castle, and started making an inventory of treasures they found there.

== Aftermath ==
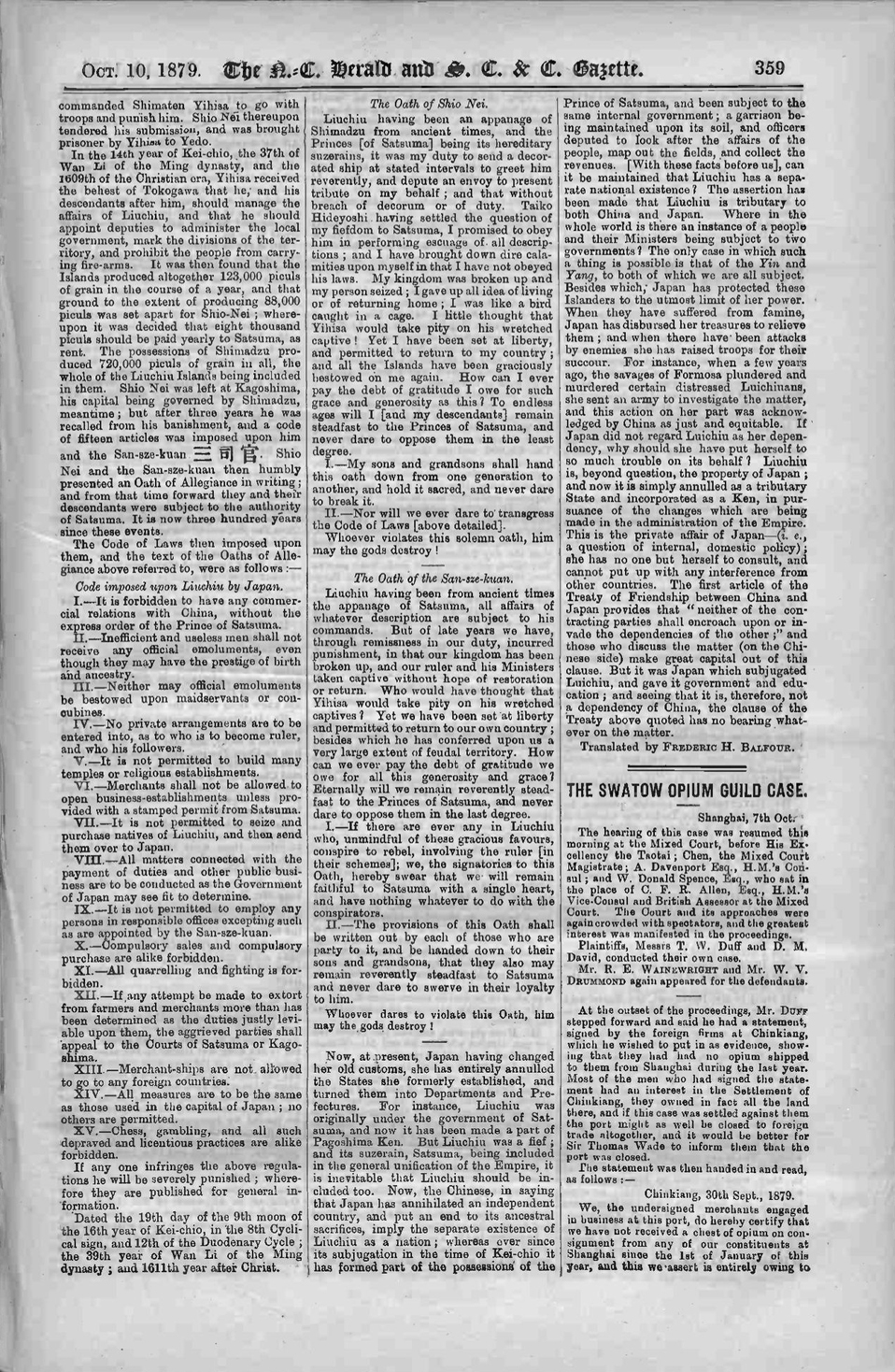
Translations of the oaths of Shō Nei and the Council of Three and of the Fifteen Injunctions, published in October 1879 in the context of the Ryūkyū Disposition in The North China Herald

On May 17, Shō Nei departed Unten harbor for Satsuma along with roughly one hundred of his officials. In August, 1610, he met with the retired Shōgun Tokugawa Ieyasu in Sunpu Castle. He was then taken to Edo, for a formal audience with Shōgun Tokugawa Hidetada on August 28. On December 24, he arrived at Kagoshima, where he was forced to formally surrender and to declare a number of oaths to the Shimazu clan. In 1611, two years after the invasion, the king returned to his castle at Shuri. In the king's absence, Kabayama Hisataka and his deputy Honda Chikamasa governed the islands on behalf of their lord Shimazu Tadatsune. 14 samurai officials from Satsuma, along with 163 of their staff, examined the kingdom's political structures and economic productivity, and conducted land surveys of all the islands. Following the king's return to Shuri and the resumption of governance under the royal establishment, some Ryukyuan officials went to Kagoshima as hostages.

The surrender documents signed at Kagoshima in 1611 were accompanied by a series of oaths. The king and his councilors were made to swear that "the islands of Riu Kiu have from ancient times been a feudal dependency of Satsuma", and that there was a long-standing tradition of sending tribute and congratulatory missions on the succession of the Satsuma lords, though these were clearly not true. The oaths also included stipulations that the kingdom admit its culpability in ignoring and rejecting numerous requests for materials and for manpower, that the invasion was justified and deserved, and that the lord of Satsuma was merciful and kind in allowing the king and his officers to return home and to remain in power. Finally, the councilors were forced to swear their allegiance to the Shimazu over their king. Tei Dō, a royal councilor and commander of the kingdom's defense against the invasion, refused to sign the oaths, and was subsequently beheaded.

The Ryukyus remained nominally independent, an "exotic realm" (異国, ikoku) to the Japanese. The kingdom's royal governmental structures also remained intact, along with its royal lineage. However, Amami Ōshima and a number of other northern islands now known as the Satsunan Islands were annexed into Satsuma Domain, and they remain today within Kagoshima Prefecture. Though the king retained considerable powers, he was only permitted to operate within a framework of strict guidelines set down by Satsuma, and was required to pay considerable amounts in tribute to Satsuma on a regular basis. Efforts were also made to obscure Satsuma's domination of Ryukyu from the Chinese Court, in order to ensure the continuation of trade and diplomacy, since China refused to conduct formal relations or trade with Japan at the time.

This framework of guidelines was largely set down by a document sometimes called the Fifteen Injunctions (掟十五ヶ条, Okite jūgo-ka-jō), which accompanied the oaths signed in Kagoshima in 1611, and which detailed political and economic restrictions placed upon the Kingdom. Prohibitions on foreign trade, diplomacy, and travel outside of that officially permitted by Satsuma were among the chief elements of these injunctions. Ryukyu's extensive trade relations with China, Korea, and Southeast Asia were turned to Satsuma's interests, and various laws were put into place forbidding interactions between Japanese and Ryukyuans, and travel between the two island nations. Likewise, travel abroad from Ryukyu in general, and the reception of ships at Ryukyu's harbors, were heavily restricted with exceptions made only for official trade and diplomatic journeys authorized by Satsuma.

== Campaign gallery ==
Engagements and movements during the Invasion of Ryukyu
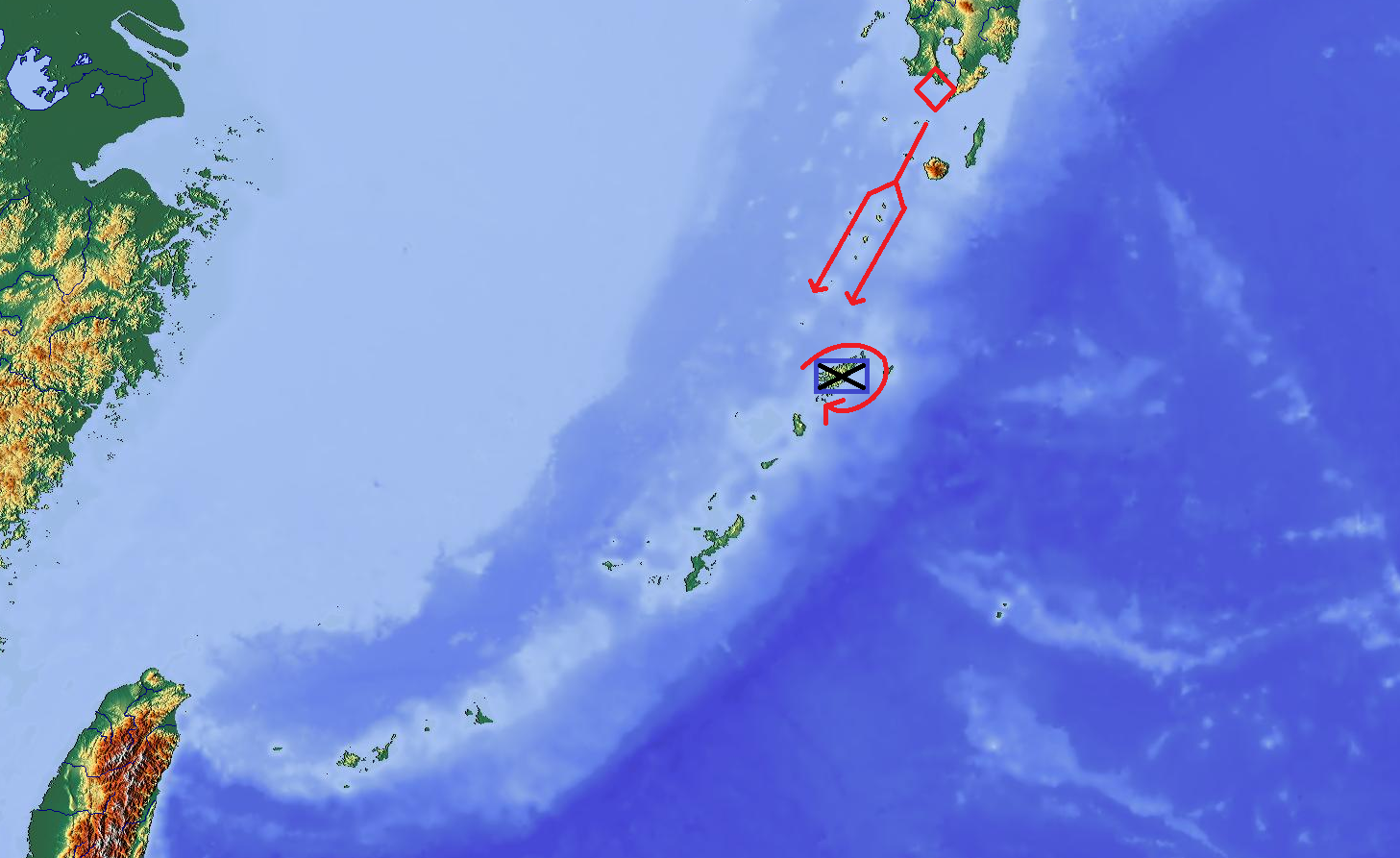
Satsuma fleet bypasses Tokara Islands to secure Amami Island (20 March – 11 April 1609)

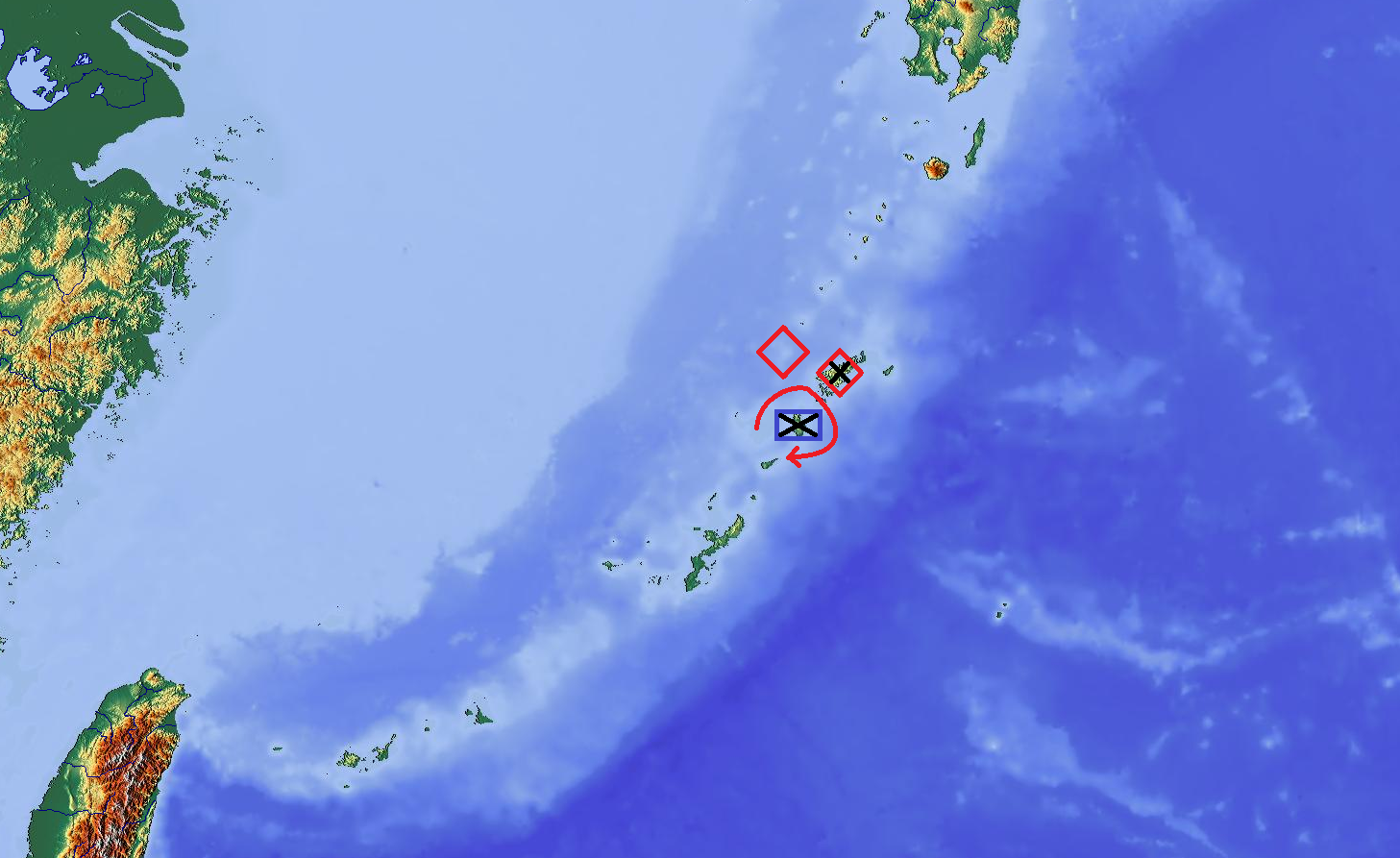
Satsuma army captures Amami Island; Satsuma fleet moves to secure Tokuno Island (11–24 April 1609)

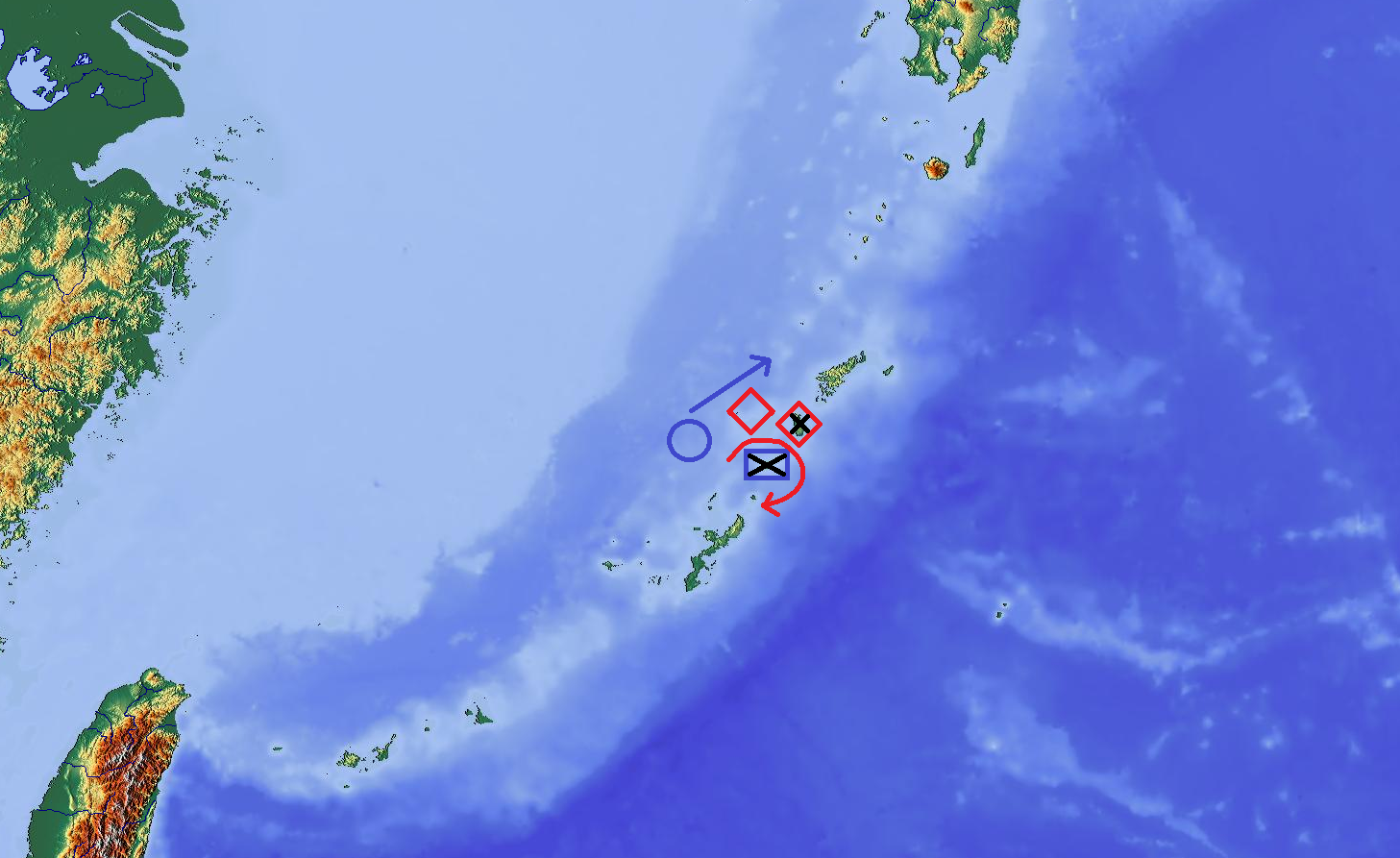
Satsuma army captures Tokuno Island; Ryukyuan fleet moves towards Amami Island; Satsuma fleet moves to secure Okinoerabu Island (24–26 April 1609)

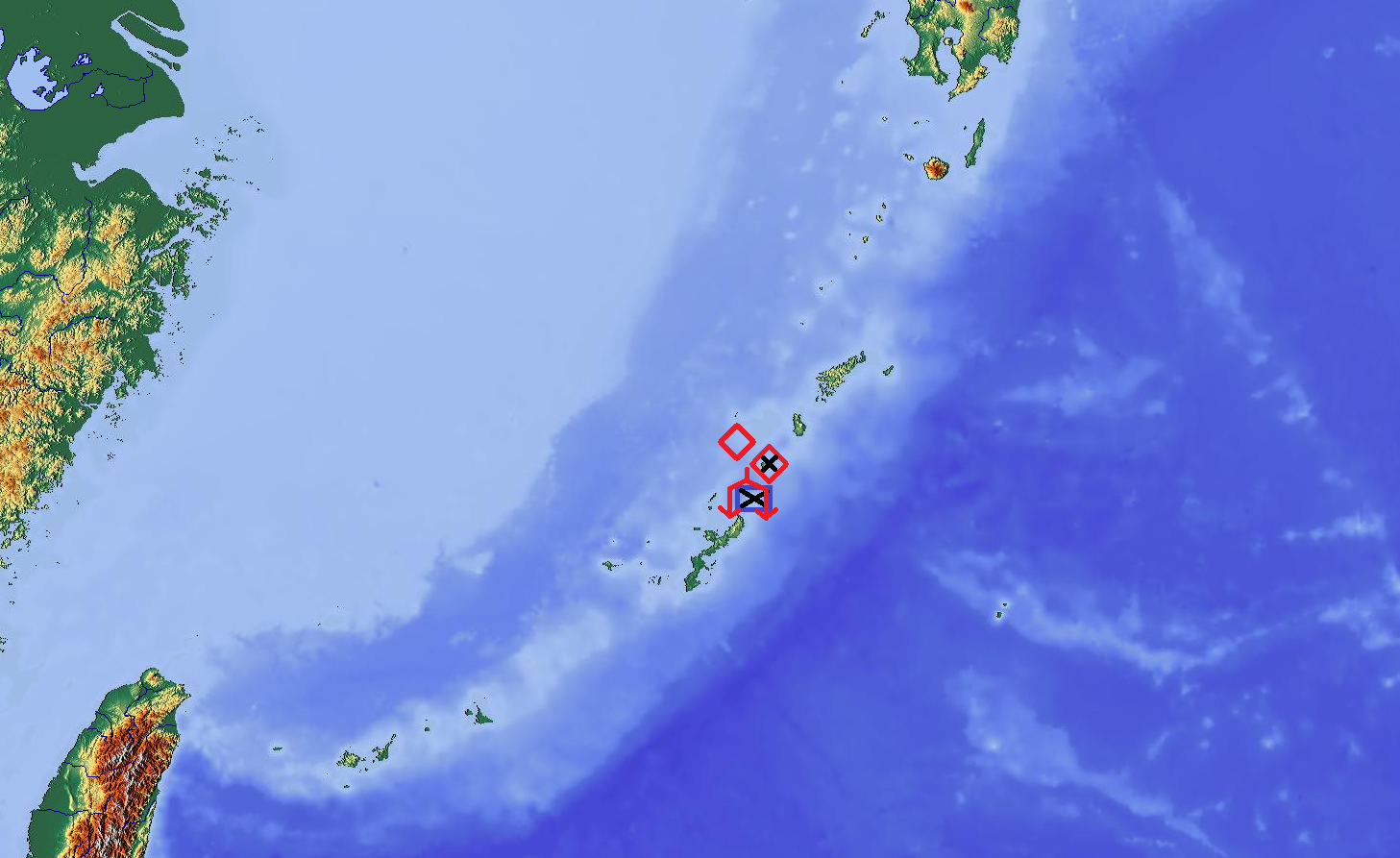
Satsuma army captures Okinoerabu Island; Satsuma fleet bypasses Yoron Island (26–28 April 1609)

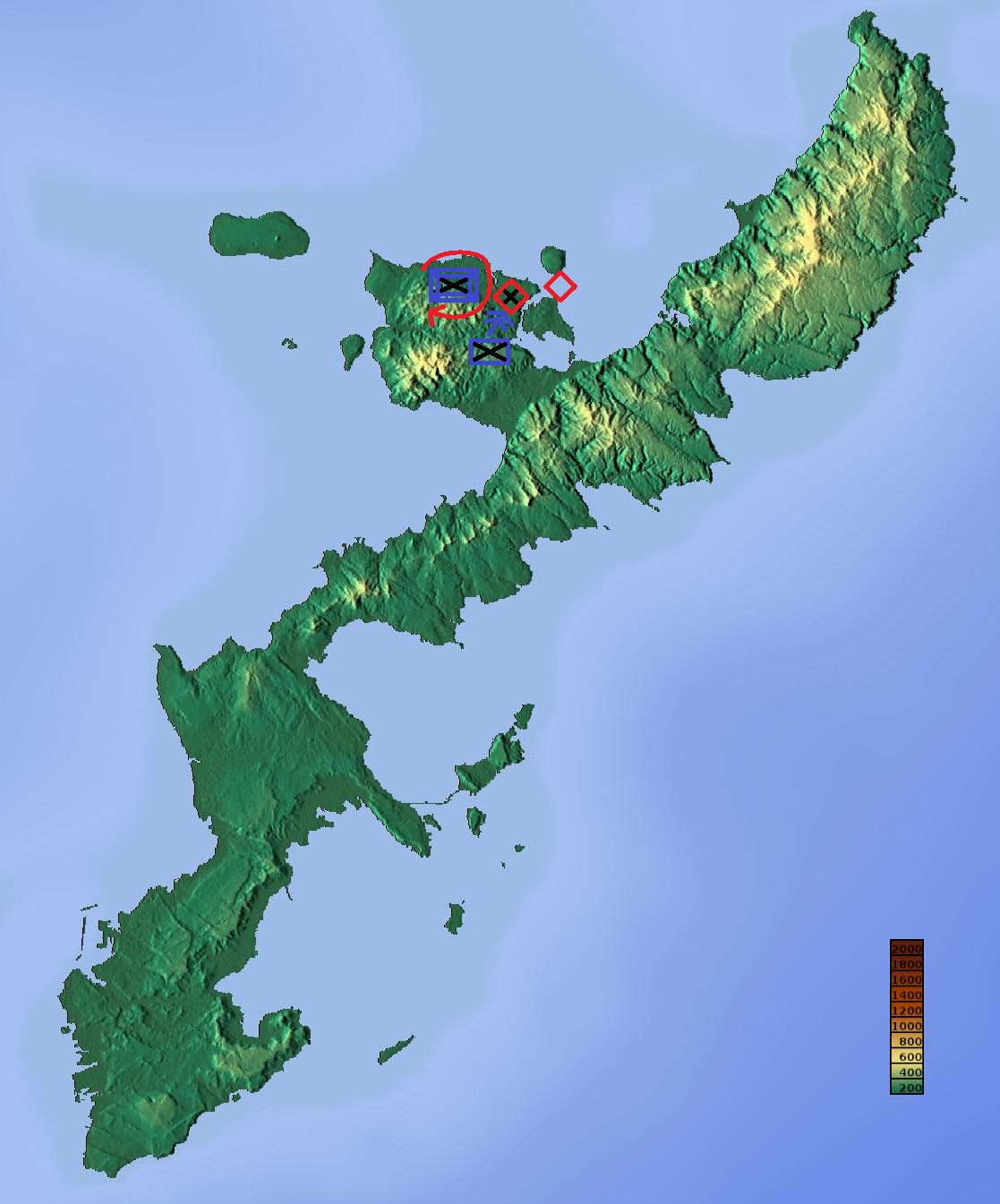
Satsuma fleet anchors near Kouri Island; Satsuma army lands at Unten and moves to secure Nakijin Castle; Ryukyuan army moves to attack Satsuma army (29 April – 1 May 1609)

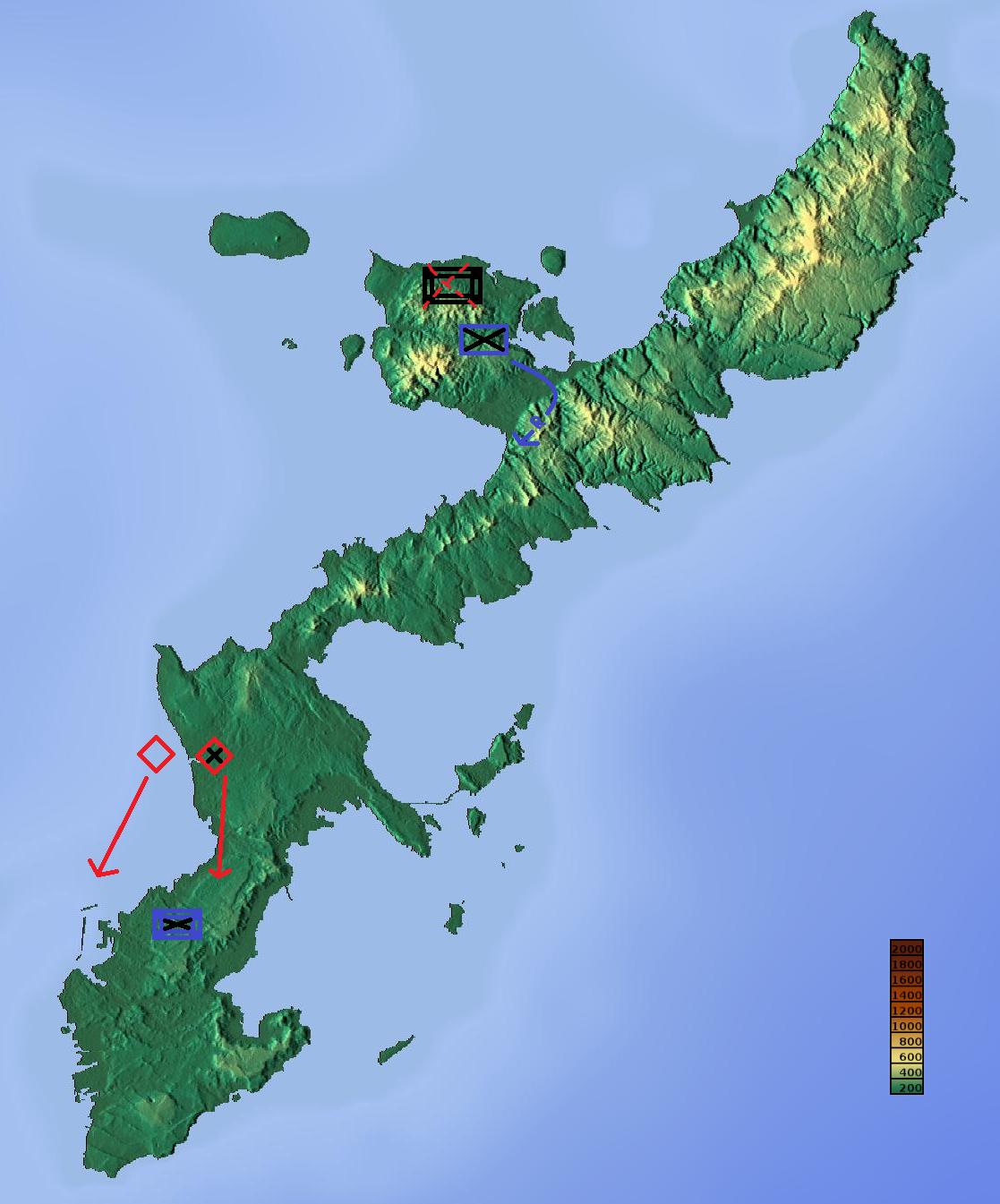
Satsuma destroys Nakijin Castle; Ryukyuan army retires; Satsuma army lands at Yomitan and advances towards Urasoe; Satsuma fleet advances towards Naha (1–3 May 1609)

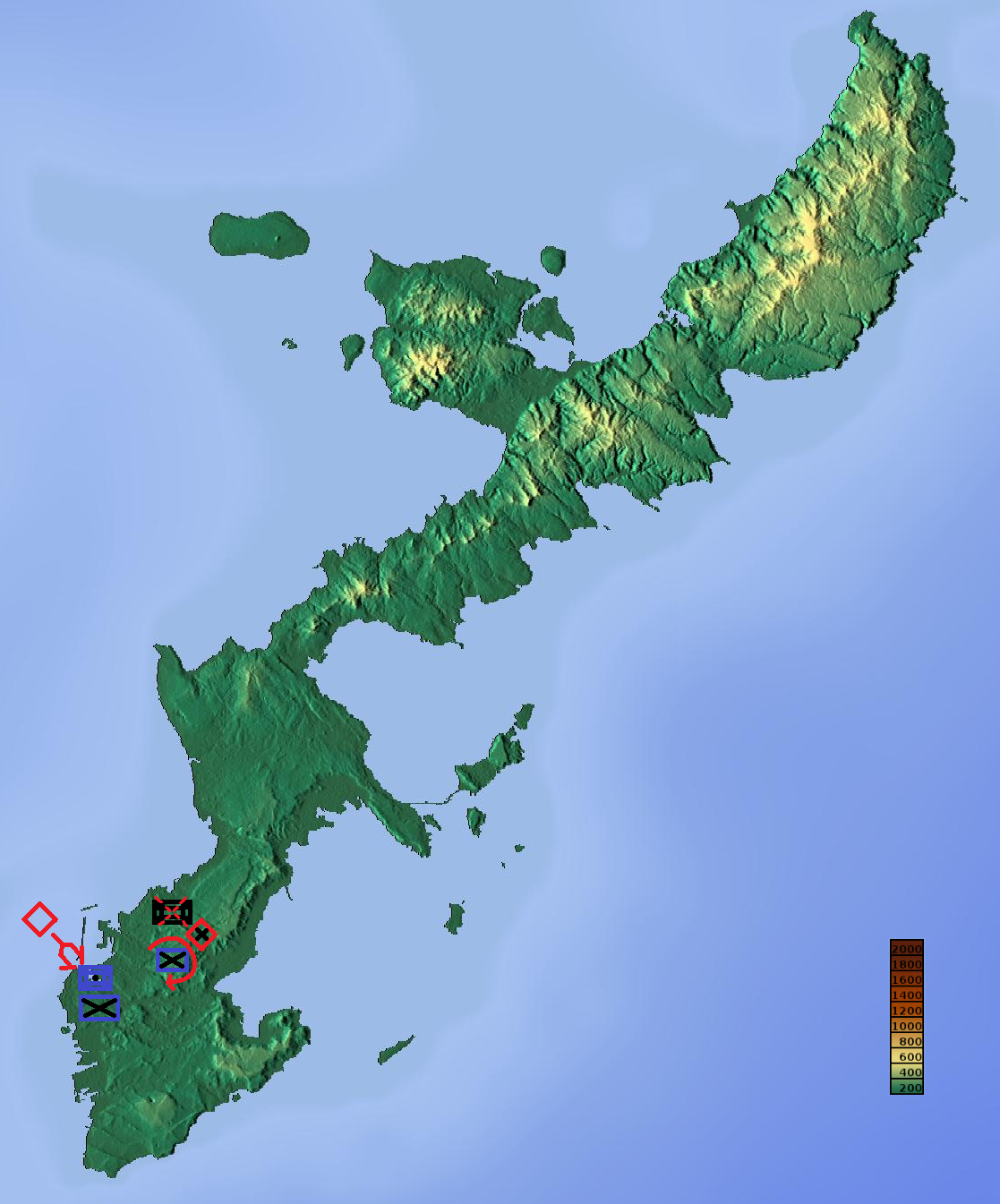
Satsuma destroys Urasoe Castle; Satsuma fleet moves to breach Naha Harbor; Satsuma army moves to secure Taihei Bridge. (3–4 May 1609)

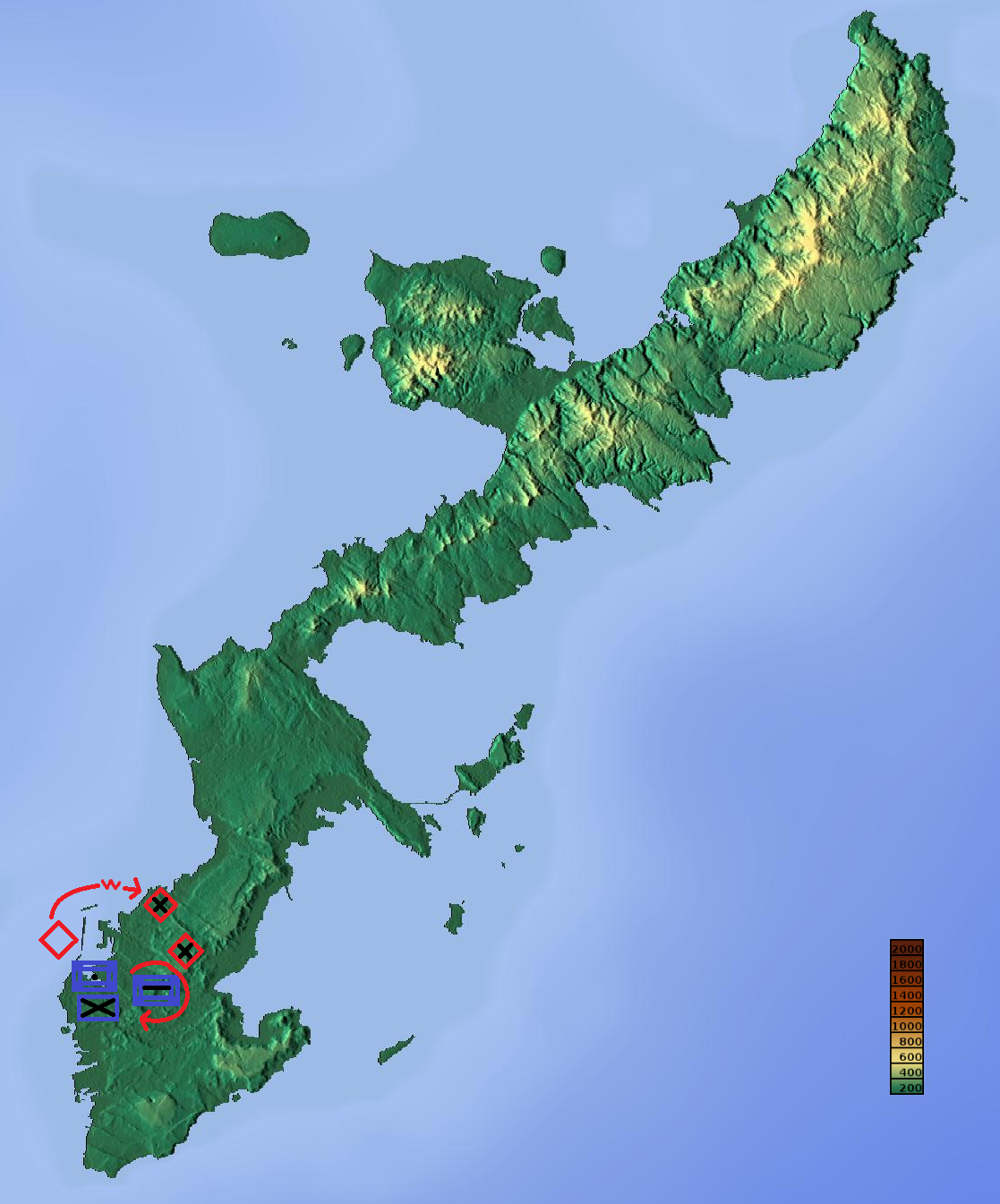
Satsuma fleet withdraws to Makiminato; Satsuma army moves to secure Shuri Castle (4–6 May 1609)

== See also ==
- Foreign relations of Imperial China
