= Shō I =

Shō I (尚 懿; ? – 3 May 1584), also known by Prince Yonagusuku Chōken (与那城 朝賢), was a royal of the Ryukyu Kingdom. He was the third head of a royal family, Oroku Udun (小禄御殿), and was also father of King Shō Nei.

Shō I was a grandson of Urasoe Chōman (Shō Ikō), the deposed crown prince of King Shō Shin. His father was Urasoe Chōkyō. Urasoe Chōshi was one of his younger brother.

Shō I had two famous sons: the eldest son was King Shō Nei, the second son was Gushichan Chōsei. He died in 1584, and buried in Urasoe yōdore.

Shō I was posthumously honored as king in 1699, and his spirit tablet was placed in Sōgen-ji. His title was stripped in 1719, and his spirit tablet was moved to Tenkai-ji.

Shō I
Preceded by Urasoe Chōkyō	Head of Oroku Udun	Succeeded by Gushichan Chōsei
