= Onna Nabe =

- Born: Onna, Okinawa
- Other name: Unna Nabii
- Occupation: Possibly farmer
- Years active: 18th century
- Known for: Poet of Ryuka (poetry), a genre of local poetry

Onna Nabe (恩納なべ; Okinawan: Unna Nabii) was a ryuka poet who was born in Onna, Okinawa, and lived in the 18th century.

== About Onna Nabe ==
Eisho Miyagi thought she had some spiritual power, and she danced as a religious person.

== Ryuka ==
Original text

恩納 松下に 禁止の碑 たちゅす 恋 しのぶまでぃの 禁止や ないさめ
恩納岳 あがた 里が 生まれ島 もりも おしのけてぃ こがたなさな
波の 声もとまれ 風の 声もとまれ 首里天がなし 美御機 拝ま

Transliteration

Unna Matyuisitani Tijunufenu Tachusu Kui Shinubumadinu Tijiya Naisami
Unnadaki Agata Satoga Umarijima Morimo Oshinuketi Kugatanasana
Naminu Kuemotomare Kazenu Kuemotomare Shuitinganashi Miunki Ogama

Translation

There stands a notice board of forbidding something under a pine tree of Onna Village. I hope the authorities are not forbidding affection between man and woman
Over Mount Onna, there is a village where my lover lives. I would like to push away the woods, and draw the village near to me
Be quiet, the sea waves. Be quiet, the sounds of the wind, Everyone. Bow the King and see his face

== Ryuka on Onna Nabe ==
Original text

間暮の 空に 立ちゅる 恩納岳

しばし 眺めゆん なべゆ 思てぃ

- 明仁

Transliteration

Yumanguwinu Shurani Tachuru Unnadaki
Shibashi Nagameyun Nabeyu Umuti

Translation

Mount Onna stands clearly against the darkening sky
I watch it for some time, thinking of Onna Nabe (Akihito, 1987)
