= Onna, Okinawa =

Village in Okinawa Prefecture, Japan

Onna 恩納村 Unna
- Village
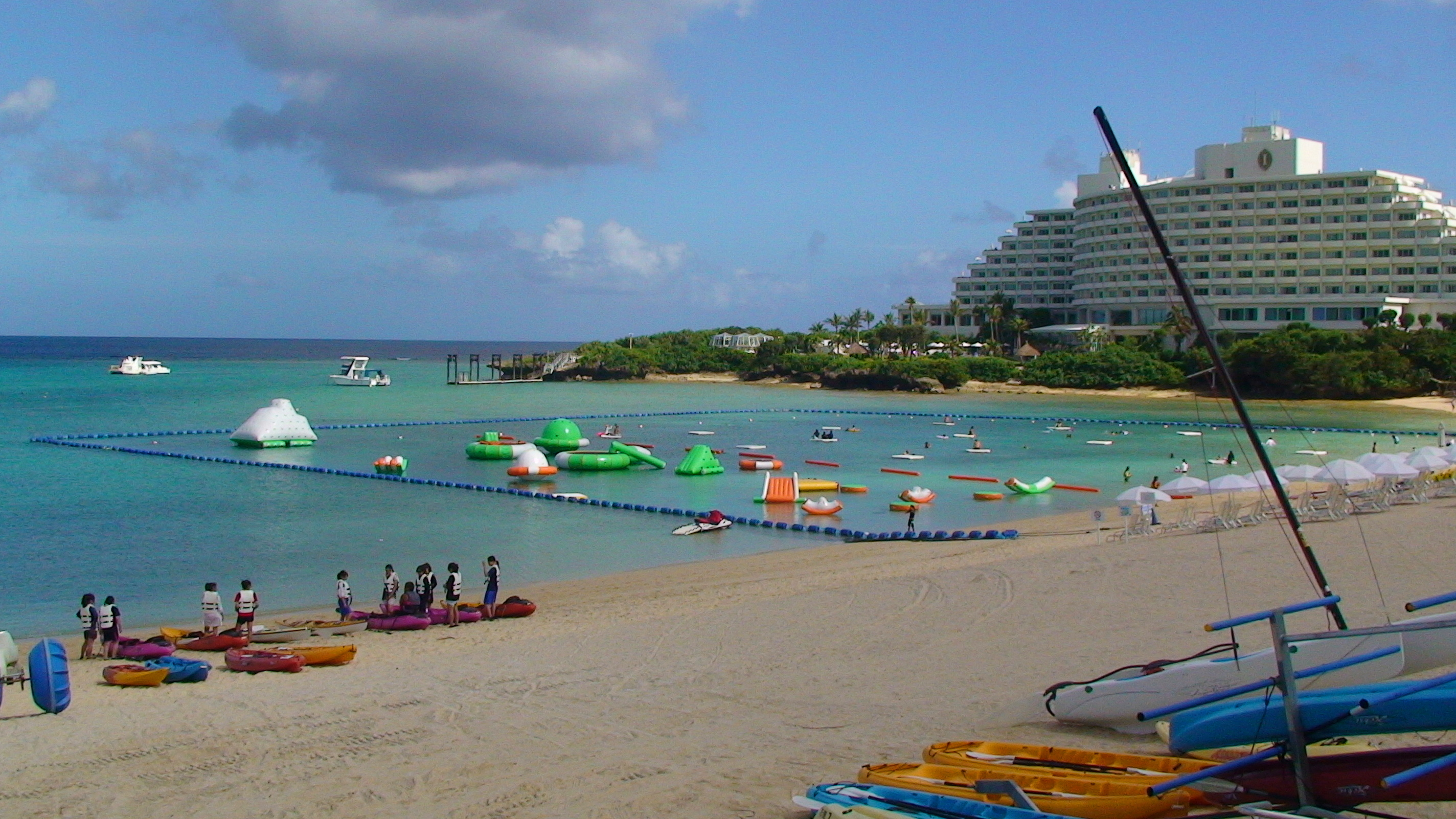
- Manza Beach

- Flag Seal

- Location of Onna in Okinawa Prefecture

- Location in Japan
- Coordinates: 26°29′N 127°51′E
- Country: Japan
- Region: Kyushu
- Prefecture: Okinawa
- District: Kunigami

Area
  - Total: 50.77 km^{2} (19.60 sq mi)

Population (October 1, 2020)
  - Total: 10,869
  - Density: 214.1/km^{2} (554.5/sq mi)
- Time zone: UTC+09:00 (JST)
- Website: www.vill.onna.okinawa.jp

Onna (Japanese: 恩納村, Hepburn: Onna-son; Kunigami and Okinawan: Unna) is a village located in Kunigami District, Okinawa Prefecture, Japan.

As of October 1, 2020, the village had an estimated population of 10,869 and a population density of 210 people per km². The total area is 50.77 square kilometres (19.60 mi^{2}). Unlike other areas of Japan, Onna has had a sustained period of population growth in the post-war period. In 1965 the population of the village was 8,471, and by 2003 it had grown to over 10,000 residents.

Onna is the site of the Okinawa Institute of Science and Technology, a research institute turned graduate university.

== History ==
Onna was first established as Unna Magiri (恩納間切) in 1673 by the Ryukyu Kingdom. Ryukyu was annexed by Japan in 1879. In 1908, the Japanese government dissolved Unna Magiri and replaced it with Onna Village.

The village is the site of the tomb of the Republic of China statesman Fang Chih, founder and Chairman of the Sino-Ryukyuan Cultural and Economic Association.

== Geography ==
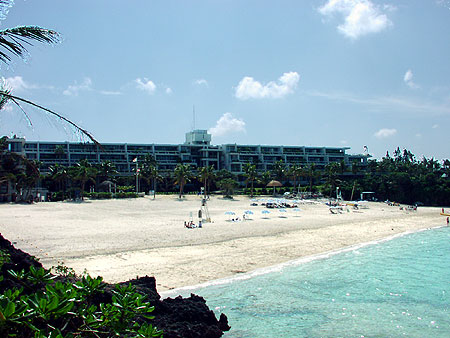
Moon Beach

Onna is located in the central part of Okinawa Island, and occupies a long, narrow stretch of the western coast of the island. The village spans 27.4 kilometres (17.0 mi) from north to south but only 4.2 kilometres (2.6 mi) from east to west. The village is located in the rugged Sekiryo Mountains that run from the north to central Okinawa Island, with Mount Onna being the highest point in the village. Settlements in the village are located in the few flatter areas.

The coastal areas of Onna was declared part of Okinawa Kaigan Quasi-National Park in 1972 after the reversion of Okinawa Prefecture to Japan. Onna is noted for its coastal scenery, notably Cape Manzamō and Cape Maeda.

== Administration ==
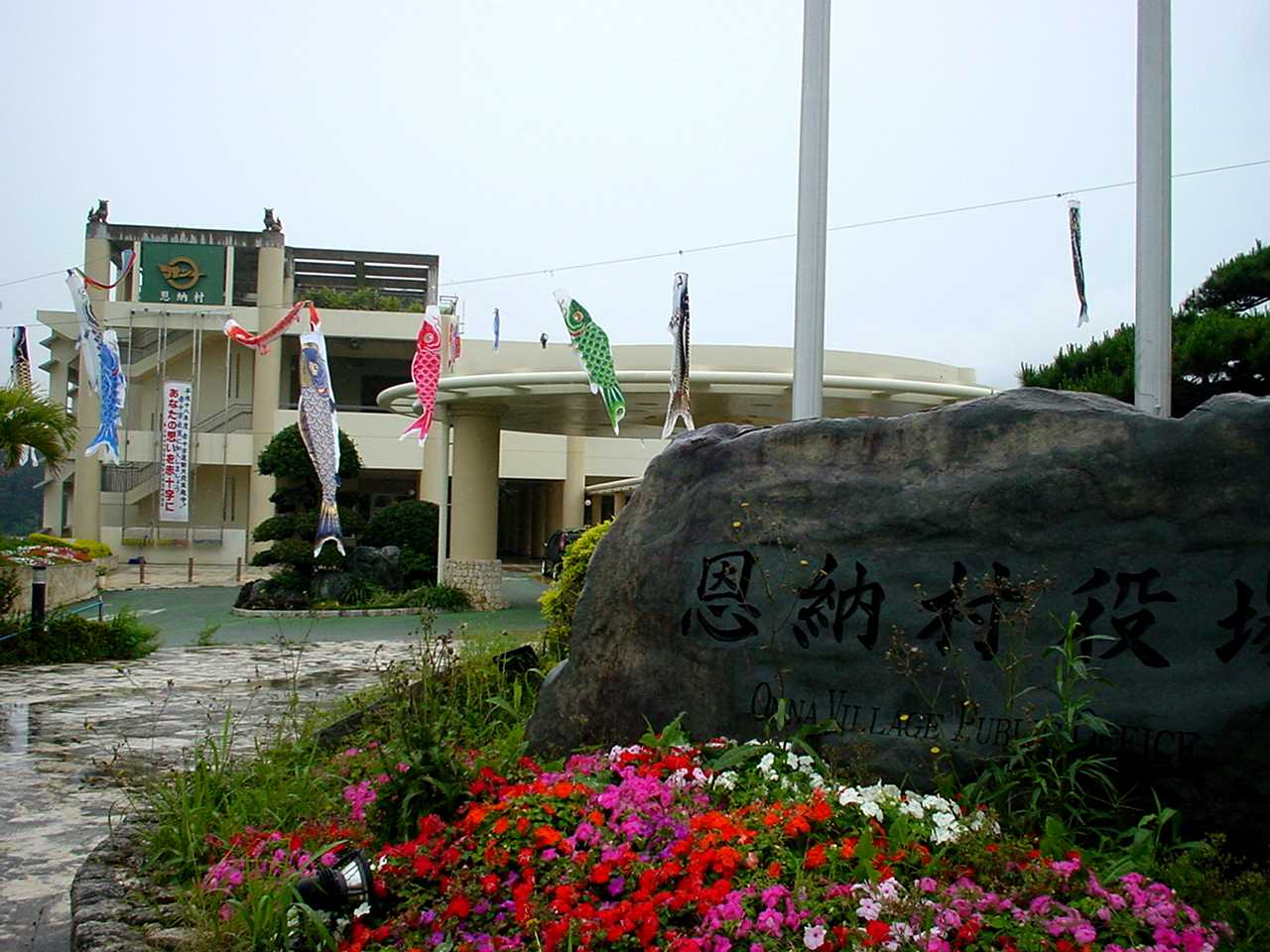
Onna Village Office

=== Administrative divisions ===
The village includes fifteen wards.

- Afuso (安富祖)
- Fuchaku (冨着)
- Kisenbaru (喜瀬武原)
- Maeda (真栄田)
- Maeganeku (前兼久)
- Minamionna (南恩納)
- Nakadomari (仲泊)
- Nakama (名嘉真)
- Onna (恩納)
- Ōta (太田)
- Serakaki (瀬良垣)
- Shioya (塩屋)
- Tancha (谷茶)
- Ukaji (宇加地)
- Yamada (山田)

=== Neighboring municipalities ===
Onna borders on six other municipalities in Okinawa prefecture.

- Ginoza
- Kin
- Nago
- Okinawa
- Uruma
- Yomitan

== Economy ==
Since World War II Onna has been a small-scale center of sugarcane production but tourists from mainland Japan, China, Taiwan, S. Korea, Australia and many other countries stay in one of the many seaside resorts that have been built just before, and after, the beginning of the new millennium. In recent years pineapples and mikan, or satsuma mandarin, have been grown in the rugged hill areas of the village. Like other municipalities on Okinawa Island, cut flowers and greenhouse vegetables intended for the Japanese homeland have become important agricultural products.

Tourism also plays an increasingly important part of the Onna, Okinawa economy and has grown significantly in the last decade. Resort hotels were built along the coastal areas in Onna after the reversion of Okinawa Prefecture to Japan in 1972, and tourism remains an important part of the economy of the village and the Onna prefecture.

== Transportation ==
=== Roads ===
Onna is crossed by Japan National Route 58, which connects the village of Kunigami in the north of Okinawa to the prefectural capital of Naha in the south. Okinawa Prefectural Route 6 intersects Route 58 at Nakadomari Village and passes through the village before intersecting with 58 again at the north end of Nakadomari. Route 73 runs east–west through the narrowest portion of Okinawa and connects Nakadomari Village on the East China Sea (west) coast to Ishikawa on the Pacific (east) coast. Prefectural Routes 86 and 104 connect the north of Onna with the town of Kin.

== Education ==
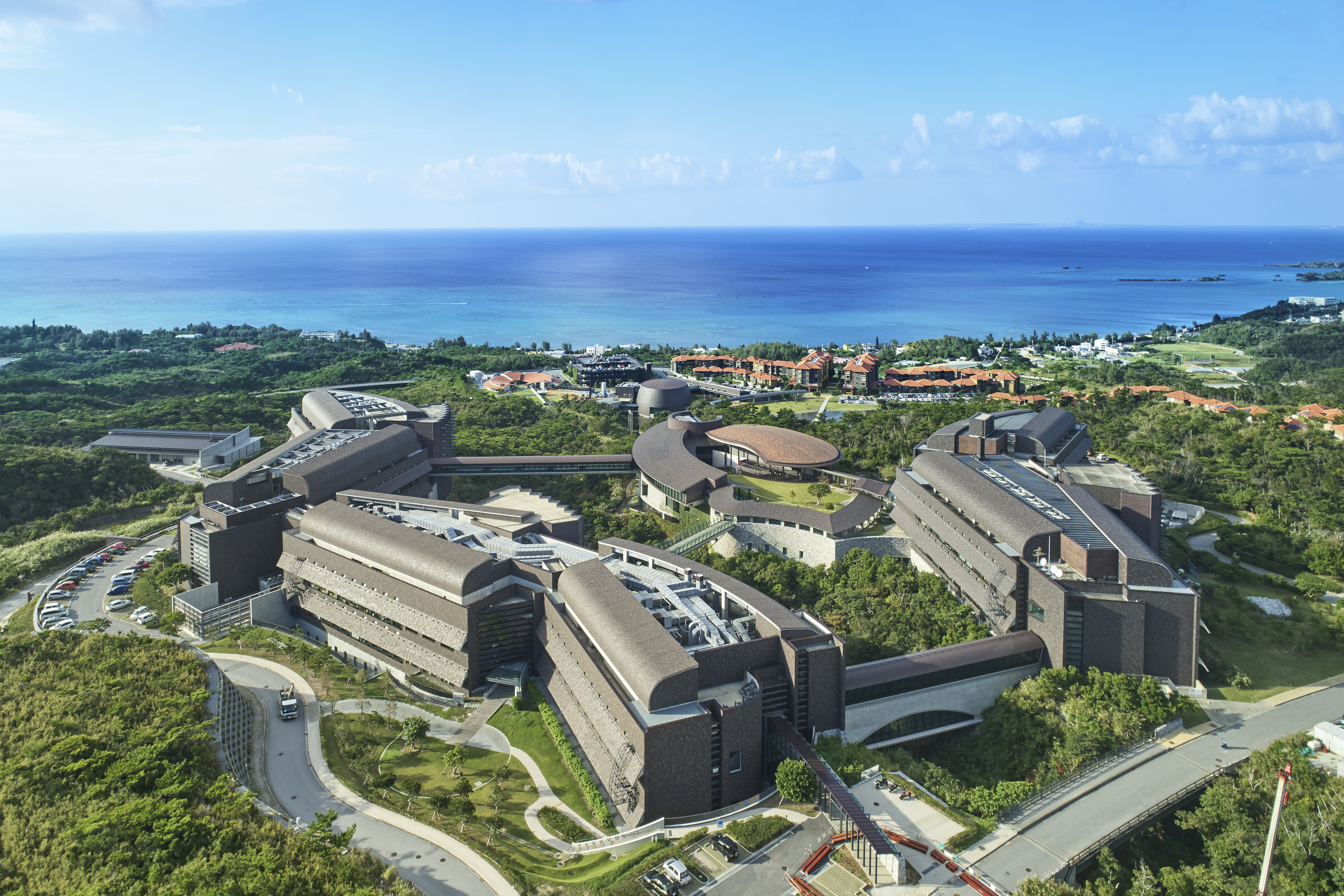
Okinawa Institute of Science and Technology

Educational institutions in Onna include Unna Junior High School and the Okinawa Institute of Science and Technology, a graduate school.

== Cultural and natural assets ==
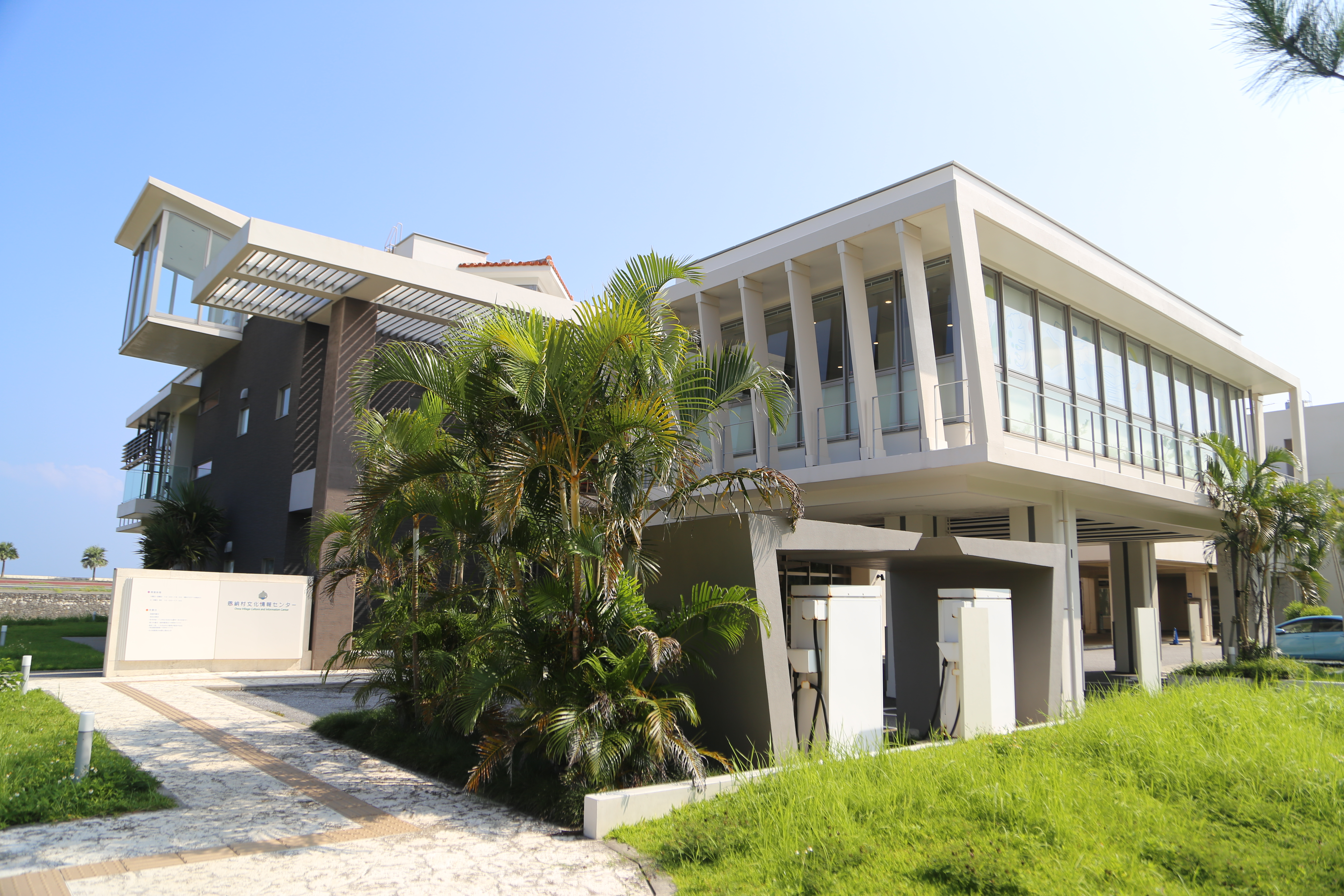
Onna Village Culture and Information Center

Onna Village hosts twenty-four designated or registered tangible cultural properties and monuments, at the national, prefectural or municipal level.

- Name (Japanese) (Type of registration)

=== Cultural Properties ===
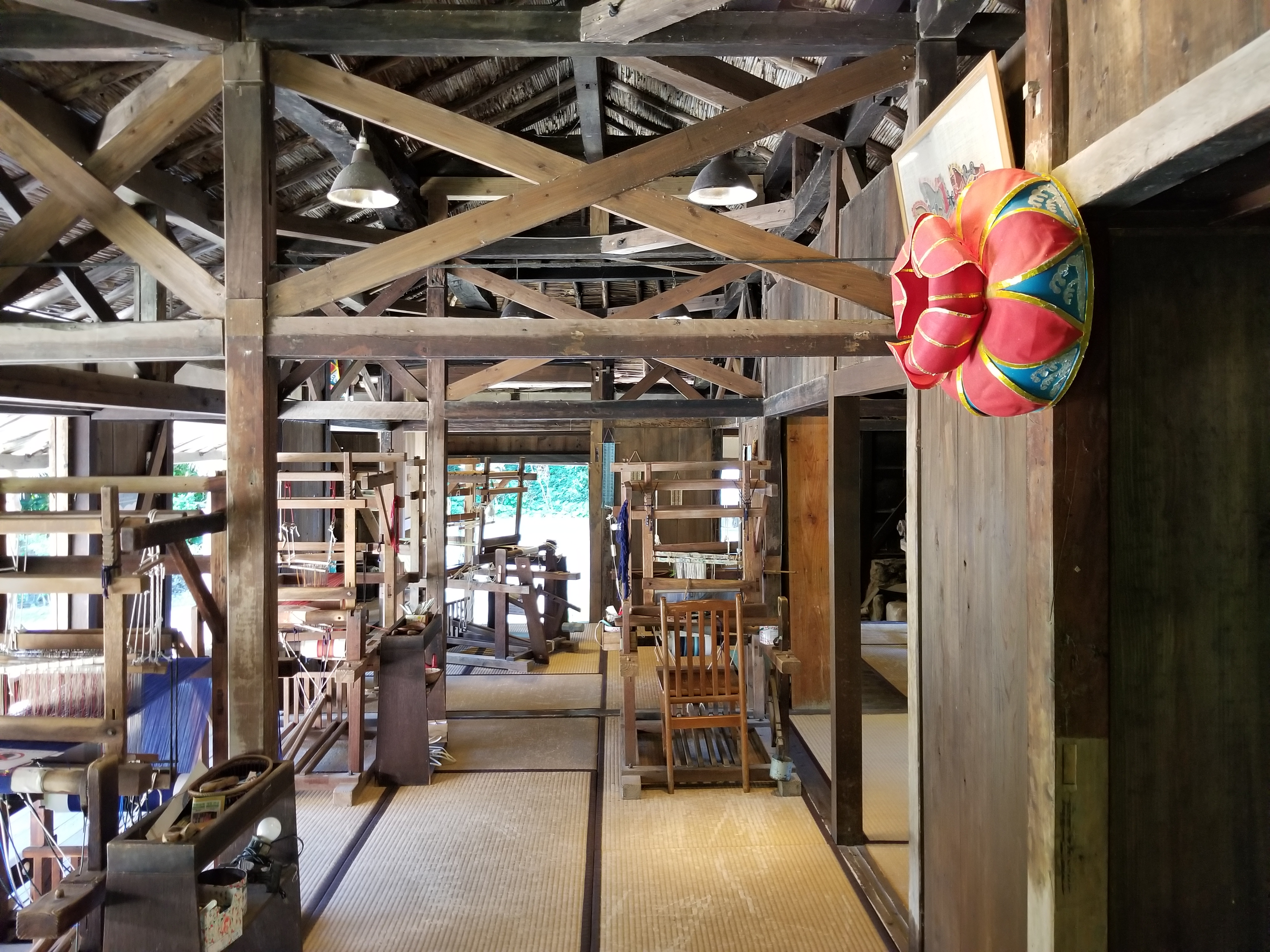
Interior of the former Nakasone family residence in Ryukyu Mura, moved from Yomitan. Seven of the ten former residences in Ryukyu Mura are Nationally Registered Tangible Cultural Properties.

- Former Higa Family Residence, main house (旧比嘉家住宅主屋) (National)
- Former Hirata Family Residence, pigpen latrines (旧平田家住宅フール) (National)
- Former Kokuba Family Residence, main house (旧國場家住宅主屋) (National)
- Former Nishishigaki Family Residence, main house (旧西石垣家住宅主屋) (National)
- Former Ōshiro Family Residence, main house (旧大城家住宅主屋) (National)
- Former Shimabukuro Family Residence, main house (旧島袋家住宅主屋) (National)
- Former Shimabukuro Family Residence, raised storehouse (旧島袋家住宅高倉) (National)
- Former Tamanaha Family Residence, main house (旧玉那覇家住宅主屋) (National)
- Maps of each village and aza of Onna Magiri in Kunigami District (国頭郡恩納間切各村全図及び字図等) (Municipal)
- Poems by Wang Wenzhi (Ō Bunchi) (王文治詩文) (Municipal)
- Poems by Xu Baoguang (Jo Hokō) (徐葆光詩文) (Municipal)
- Sanshin, Makabi type (三線真壁型) (Prefectural)
- Sanshin, Makabi type, inscribed "Amuro" (三線真壁型銘安室) (Prefectural)
- Survey stones (shirube-ishi) of Onna Village (恩納村の印部石) (Municipal)
- Tōjin Baka Tombstone (唐人墓の墓碑) (Municipal)

=== Folk Cultural Properties ===
- Hamasaki Utaki (浜崎御嶽) (Municipal)
- Kanjagā spring (カンジャガー) (Municipal)
- Uduigama Cave (ウドゥイガマ) (Municipal)

=== Historic Sites ===
- Kunigami Western Coast Road (国頭方西海道) (National)
- Maeda Ichirizuka Mound (真栄田の一里塚) (Municipal)
- Nakadomari Site (仲泊遺跡) (National)
- Yamada Castle Site (山田城跡) (National)

=== Places of scenic beauty ===
- Cape Manzamo (万座毛) (Prefectural)

=== Natural Monuments ===
- Cape Manza limestone plant community (万座毛石灰岩植物群落) (Prefectural)

== Notable people ==
- Onna Nabe, ryuka poet
