= Kabayama Hisataka =

Retainer(Vassal) of the Shimazu clan (1560–1634)

Kabayama Gonzaemon Hisataka (樺山 権左衛門 久高; 1560–1634) was a Japanese samurai of the early Edo period. He was a retainer, senior advisor (karō), and senior deputy commander in the service of the Shimazu clan.

== Early life ==
Hisataka was born into the fifth generation of the Shimazu family line, adopting 'Kabayama' as his surname in respect to the birch (樺, kaba)-covered mountaintop (山, yama) upon which his castle domain had been constructed.

== Warrior ==
In 1609, Hisataka led military forces of the Shimazu clan against the Kingdom of Ryukyu. The Invasion of Ryukyu was successful.

== See also ==
- Hirata Masumune
- Kabayama Sukenori
