= Kian (tea master) =

Japanese tea master and priest

Kian (喜安; 20 January 1566 – 10 August 1653) was a Japanese tea master and priest who was active in the Ryukyu Kingdom. In Ryukyuan history records, his full name was Bin-shi Kian Nyūdō Bangen (閔氏 喜安入道 蕃元) or Bin-shi Kian Ueekata Bangen (閔氏 喜安 親方 蕃元). He is best known for his diary, the Kian Nikki (喜安日記), which chronicled the 1609 Invasion of Ryukyu.

Kian was born in Sakai, Izumi Province, Japan. He studied tea ceremony from Kōin (康印), a disciple of Sen no Rikyū. Later, he learned Waka and Classical Chinese poetry.

Kian came to Ryukyu at the age of 35. He enjoyed a widespread reputation there and several years later he was appointed Chamberlain of the palace and was given the Chinese style surname, Bin (閔).

In the spring of 1609, Satsuma Domain invaded Ryukyu and captured the strategically important Nakijin Castle. Kian went there to request a peace negotiation together with a Buddhist monk named Kikuin, but they were arrested by Satsuma troops. After the war, he was taken to Kagoshima together with King Shō Nei and a number of high officials by Satsuma troops. After Shō Nei returned to Ryukyu, Kian was appointed "imperial tea master" (御茶道).

Kian wrote a Gunki monogatari called Kian Nikki (喜安日記, "Kian Diary") during King Shō Hō's reign. It is a very important account of Satsuma's invasion.
