= Mount Onna =

Mountain in Japan

Coordinates: 26°28′43.968″N 127°52′28.9992″E

Mount Onna (恩納岳, Onna-dake; Kunigami: Unna-dakī, Okinawan: Unna-daki) is a mountain in Onna Village, Okinawa. It is the highest point in central Okinawa, standing at 363 metres (1,191 ft). The village of Onna was named after the mountain during the Gusuku period.

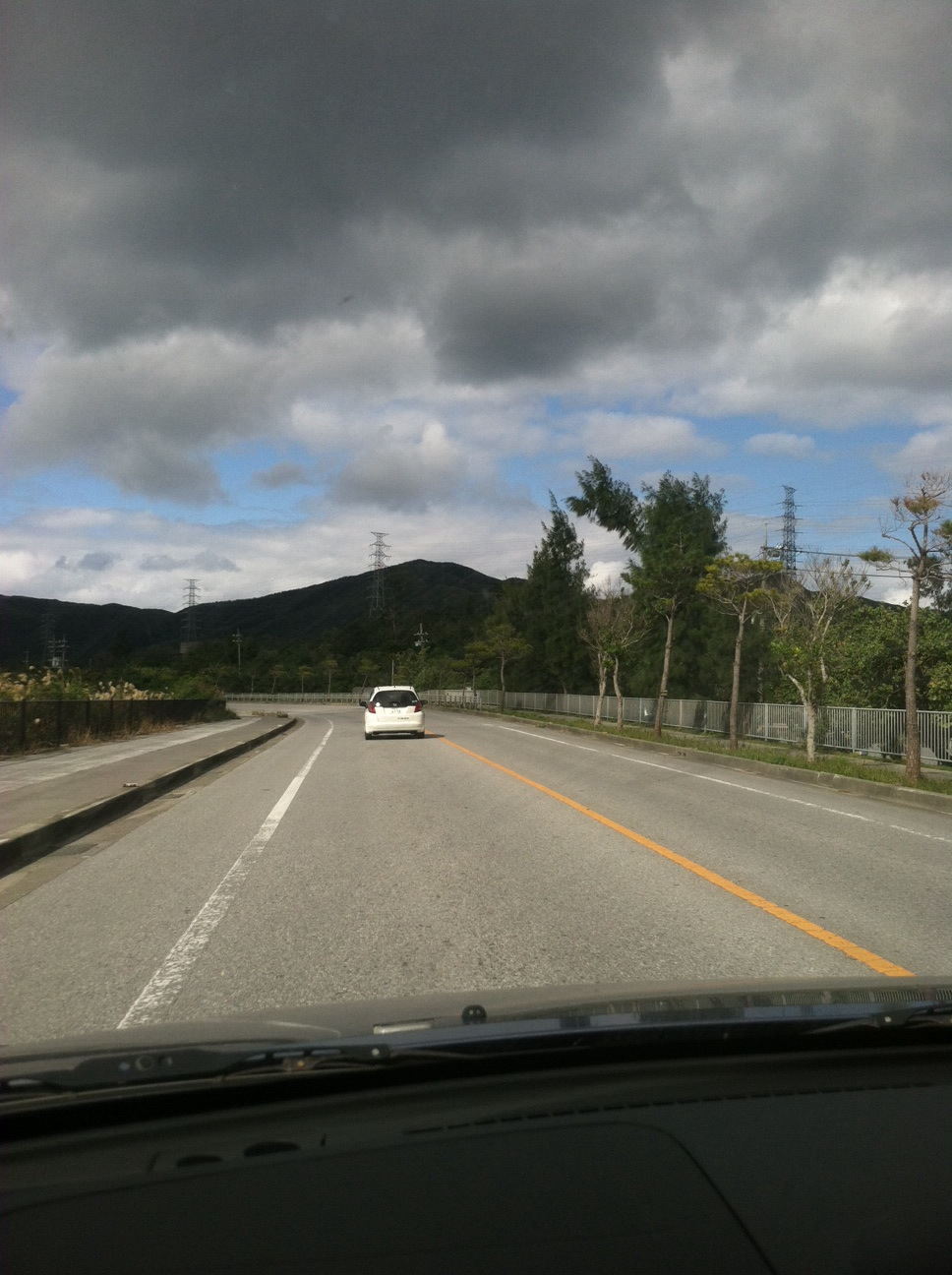
View of Mount Onna from Kin Town, on highway 329 South.

== See also ==
- Onna Nabe
