= Heshikiya Chōbin =

Ryukyuan scholar (1700–1734)

Heshikiya Chōbin (平敷屋朝敏; Okinawan: Fīshichiya Chōbin) (1700–1734) was one of the leaders of a plot to overthrow Sai On, chief royal advisor to King Shō Kei of the Ryūkyū Kingdom, a plot for which he was arrested and executed. Chōbin was a scholar of Japanese literature and member of a pro-Japanese faction in the kingdom's government.

The grandson of a scholar of Japanese studies, Heshikiya Chōbin is said to have been quite talented, and studied Japan from a very young age.

As a member of the Ryūkyū mission to Edo in 1718, Chōbin enjoyed the opportunity to study Japanese subjects there, and to view kabuki, Noh, and ningyō jōruri (puppet theatre) performances. Upon his return to Okinawa, he viewed the first performances of kumi odori, now a major form of traditional Ryukyuan dance, and created his own piece for the form, a love story entitled temizu no en (手水の縁, "Fate of washwater"), in which he incorporated political criticism and evoked the wrath of King Shō Kei. Along with fellow Okinawan government official Tomoyose Anjō (tumuyushi anjoo 友寄安乗), he composed a letter in 1734 to the judicial offices of Japan's Satsuma Domain, of which the Ryūkyū Kingdom was a vassal, criticizing the kingdom's government, in particular royal advisor Sai On, who was accused of being pro-Chinese. When the royal government learned of this development, Chōbin was arrested and crucified; fourteen others were likewise executed. A legend tells that Heshikiya and the daughter of Shō Kei had been in love, and that when he was executed, she threw herself from the walls of the castle, committing suicide; it is said that only her leg was found, and from then on a particular pavilion in the castle's gardens came to be known as One-Leg Pavilion (Kunra gushiku).
