= Shō Nei =

Shō Nei 尚寧
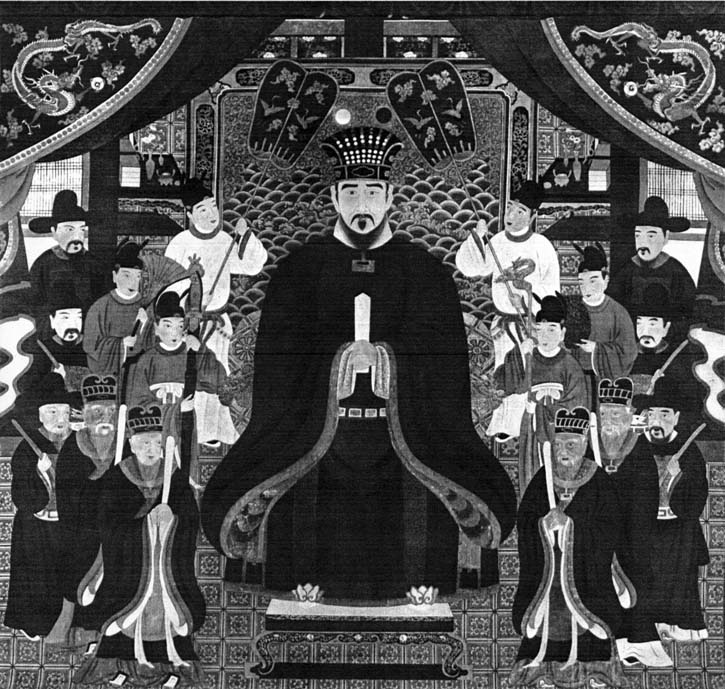
- Shō Nei, painted by Shō Genko (1748–1841) in 1796.

King of Ryūkyū
- Reign: 1589–1620
- Predecessor: Shō Ei
- Successor: Shō Hō
- Born: Umitukugani (思徳金); 1564
- Died: October 14, 1620 (aged 55–56)
- Burial: Urasoe Yōdore, Urasoe, Okinawa
- Spouse: Aoriyae Aji-ganashi
- Concubine: Nishi no Aji; Adaniya Ōaji-shirare
Names
- Shō Nei (尚寧)
- Okinawan pronunciation: Shō Nī (尚寧)
- Divine name: Tedagasuhe-ajisohe (日賀末按司添, Okinawan: Tīdagashī-ajishī)
- House: Second Shō dynasty
- Father: Shō I, Prince Yonagusuku Chōken
- Mother: Shuriōkimi Aji-ganashi
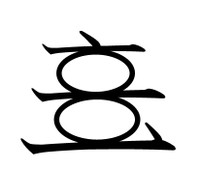
- Signature

Shō Nei (尚寧; 1564 – 14 October 1620) was king of the Ryukyu Kingdom from 1589 to 1620. He reigned during the 1609 invasion of Ryukyu and was the first king of Ryukyu to be a vassal to the Shimazu clan of Satsuma, a Japanese feudal domain.

Shō Nei was the great-grandson of Shō Shin (r. 1477–1526) and the adopted son-in-law of Shō Ei (r. 1573–1586).

== Biography ==
Early in Shō Nei's reign, Japanese warlord Toyotomi Hideyoshi planned an invasion of Korea. Through messengers from Satsuma, he ordered that the kingdom contribute warriors to the invasion efforts, and was refused; he also commanded that Ryukyu temporarily suspend its official missions to China. The mission traveled to Beijing anyway, on business relating to Shō Nei's formal investiture, and related Hideyoshi's plans to Chinese Court officials there. A short while later, Shō Nei sent a missive to Hideyoshi, as was customary upon the installation of a new ruler. He formally congratulated Hideyoshi on having taken over Japan, and on bringing peace and prosperity to the realm, and sent along with the missive a gift of Ming Chinese lacquerware. The letter referred to Ryukyu as a "small and humble island kingdom [which], because of its great distance and because of lack of funds, has not rendered due reverence to you." Shimazu Yoshihisa, lord of Satsuma, then suggested that Ryukyu be allowed to supply food and other supplies instead of manpower. Hideyoshi accepted this proposal, but Shō Nei ignored it, and sent no supplies.

Following Hideyoshi's death in 1598, and Tokugawa Ieyasu's subsequent rise to power, Shō Nei was asked by Satsuma to formally submit to the new shogunate, a request which was also ignored.

Satsuma invaded Ryukyu in the spring of 1609. When Satsuma landed in Northern Okinawa and attacked Nakijin Castle, the King's son and heir apparent, Shō Kokushi, was killed during the battle. Shō Nei surrendered on the fifth day of the fourth lunar month after Satsuma surrounded and breached Shuri Castle. Shō Nei was taken, along with a number of his officials, to Sunpu to meet with the retired Shōgun Tokugawa Ieyasu, then to Edo for a formal audience with Shōgun Tokugawa Hidetada, and then to Kagoshima, where he was forced to formally surrender and to declare a number of oaths to the Shimazu clan. At Edo, the shōgun stated that Shō Nei should be allowed to remain in power due to the long history of his line's rule over the islands.

This marked the first time the ruler of a foreign country had come to Japan, and Shimazu Tadatsune, the lord of Satsuma, made sure to take advantage of the political value of the occasion for himself. His successors would continue to make use of their status as the only daimyō to have a foreign king as a vassal to secure for themselves greater political privileges, stipends, and court ranking. In 1611, two years after the invasion, the king returned to his castle at Shuri once Tadatsune and his advisors were satisfied that he would uphold the oaths he had sworn.

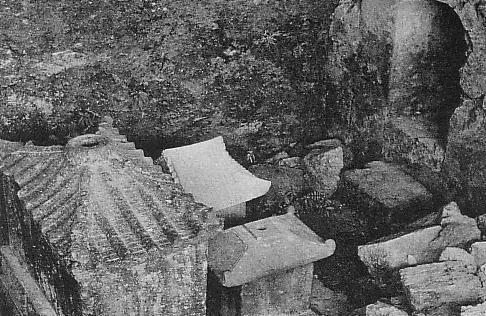
Stone sarcophagus of King Sho Nei

Though Satsuma initially exercised a strong hand in declaring policy in Ryukyu, and purging the royal government of those perceived as disloyal to Satsuma, by 1616 this approach came to an end. "Japanization" measures were reversed, at the request of Satsuma, and Shō Nei was once more formally granted primacy over his kingdom. For the remainder of his reign, Shō Nei would continue to bear all the trappings of royal authority, and exercised great power over his domain within the frameworks set by Satsuma.

Upon his death, Shō Nei was buried not in the royal mausoleum at Shuri, but rather at Urasoe Castle. A popular assumption is that this is because he felt that by succumbing to Satsuma's invasion, he had deeply dishonored himself before his ancestors, and was unfit to be buried with them. However, Shō Nei was originally from Urasoe.

== The Oaths Sworn ==
Shō Nei was forced to swear a number of oaths during his time in Kagoshima, as he and his kingdom were formally made vassals to the Shimazu clan. The so-called Fifteen Injunctions (掟十五ヶ条, Okite jūgo-ka-jō) were among the most major, and primarily involved political and diplomatic matters. These stated, among other stipulations, that Ryukyu would not engage in trade or diplomatic relations with foreign states without the consent of Satsuma. These policies, along with maritime restrictions and other stipulations, would govern Ryukyu's domestic situation and foreign relations for over 250 years.

Shō Nei and the members of his Council of Three were also required to swear that the kingdom had long been a dependency of Satsuma (a falsehood), and that they acknowledged that their failure in recent years to live up to their obligations to Satsuma had brought this invasion, a punitive measure, upon themselves. The oath went on to acknowledge the benevolence of Satsuma in allowing the king and his councillors to return to their kingdom, and to continue to rule. Shō Nei swore to pass on these oaths to his descendants, further ensuring the relative permanence of the vassal-lord relationship into which Ryukyu had been entered with Satsuma.

== See also ==
- Imperial Chinese missions to the Ryukyu Kingdom

== Notes ==
Regnal titles
Preceded by Shō Ei	King of Ryūkyū; 1587–1620	Succeeded by Shō Hō
