= Imperial Chinese missions to the Ryukyu Kingdom =

The Yuan, Ming and Qing emperors of China intermittently sent diplomatic missions (Okinawan: sappūshi) to Shuri, Okinawa, in the Ryukyu Islands. These diplomatic contacts were within the Sinocentric system of bilateral and multinational relationships in the Sinosphere. Some missions were sent to perform investiture ceremonies for the King of Ryukyu, formally acknowledging him as King on behalf of the Chinese Imperial Court, and as a tributary subordinate.

== The envoys in Shuri ==
Shuri was the royal capital of the Ryukyu Kingdom. It is today part of the city of Naha, Okinawa.

Upon the accession of a new king, the news was generally communicated to the Chinese capital, along with a petition for the investiture, by a formal Ryukyuan tribute mission. Following the 1609 invasion of Ryukyu, beginning with the succession of Shō Hō, the Satsuma Domain also had to be notified and asked for approval and confirmation of the new king.

Chinese envoys would then be dispatched - sometimes quite quickly, sometimes not until over a decade later - arriving in ships called ukwanshin (御冠船; lit. "crown ships") in Okinawan. The mission would usually consist of two official envoy ships, separate crafts carrying the chief envoy and his deputy, as some uncertainty accompanied the journey; these would be accompanied by a number of merchant ships. During Japan's Edo period, an agent from Satsuma known as a kansen bugyō (冠船奉行; "investiture (crown) ships magistrate") would be sent down to Ryukyu to supervise the exchanges and interactions between Chinese and Ryukyuan officials, albeit from somewhat of a distance, given the policy of hiding Satsuma's involvement in Ryukyu from the Chinese.

Envoys generally stayed in Ryukyu for four to eight months, and were extensively entertained by the Ryukyuan royal court. A number of structures built for this purpose, including the Ryūtan pond and the Hokuden (North Hall) of Shuri Castle, can still be seen today on the castle grounds. The total Chinese entourage generally numbered between 300 and 800 people, and hosting and entertaining the Chinese envoys was an extremely expensive endeavor for the Ryukyuan court.

A "dance magistrate (踊奉行, odori bugyō; O: udui bugyō)" oversaw these entertainments; kumi odori, a traditional form of Ryukyuan dance-drama, was first created and performed for entertaining an investiture envoy and his fellows, in 1719.

== Timeline of missions ==
King Satto became, in 1372, the first Ryukyuan king to submit to Chinese suzerainty. Beginning with the investiture of Satto's successor, Bunei, in 1404, twenty-two such missions traveled to Ryukyu in total, the last in 1866, for the investiture of Shō Tai.

Year	Emperor of China	Chinese envoys	Ryūkyū king	Comments
1373	Jianwen	Yang Zai 楊載	Satto	mission purpose is to bring islands into Sinitic system.
1404	Yongle	Shi Zhong 時中	Bunei	investiture (cefeng) mission confirms Bunei as king in Ryukyu.
1415	Yongle	Chen Xiuro 陳秀若	Shō Shishō	
1427	Xuande	Chai Shan 柴山; Ruan Jian	Shō Hashi	
1443	Zhengtong	Yu Bian 余忭; Liu Xun 劉遜	Shō Chū	
1448	Zhengtong	Chen Chuan 陳傳; Wan Xiang 萬祥	Shō Shitatsu	
1452	Jingtai	Qiao Yi 喬毅; Tong Shouhong 童守宏	Shō Kinpuku	
1456	Jingtai	Yan Cheng 嚴誠; Liu Jian 劉儉	Shō Taikyū	
1464	Chenghua	Pang Rong 潘榮; Cai Zhe 蔡哲	Shō Toku	
1472	Hongzhi	Guang Rong 官榮; Han Wen 韓文	Shō En	installation of the new king.
1479	Hongzhi	Dong Min 董旻; Zhang Xiang 張祥	Shō Shin	
1534	Jiajing	Chen Kan 陳侃; Gao Cheng 高澄	Shō Sei	mission encompassed a retinue of over 200 persons travelling in two ships which were specially constructed for this diplomatic purpose. The ambassador recorded details of the voyage and the reception the Chinese encountered in Shuri, the capital of the kingdom. This book, Shi Liu-ch'iu lu (Chinese: 使琉球錄), still exists in transcription Chinese, Japanese and Korean versions.
1561	Jiajing	Guo Rulin 郭汝霖; Li Jichun 李際春	Shō Gen	
1576	Wanli		Shō Ei	Hseieh Chieh was a member of the 1576 mission to the Ryukyu Islands. He published an account of his experiences.
1579	Wanli	Xiao Chongye 蕭崇業; Hseieh Chieh 謝杰	Shō Ei	
1606	Wanli	Xia Ziyang 夏子陽; Wang Shizhen 王士楨	Shō Nei	
1633	Chongzhen	Du Sance 杜三策; Yang Lun 楊掄	Shō Hō	investitutre of king
1663	Kangxi	Zhang Xueli 張學禮; Wang Gai 王垓	Shō Shitsu	investitutre of king
1683	Kangxi	Wang Ji 汪楫; Lin Linchang 林麟焻	Shō Tei	investitutre of king.
1719	Kangxi	Haibao 海寶; Xu Baoguang 徐葆光	Shō Kei	Kumi odori, a new form of dance-drama, created by Tamagusuku Chōkun for the entertainment of the Chinese envoys, is first performed for the envoys for the investiture of King Shō Kei.
1757	Qianlong	Quan Kui 全魁; Chou Huang 周煌,	Shō Boku	Chou Huang compiles the Ryūkyū-koku shiryaku (Chinese: 琉球國志略), an account of Ryukyuan history and customs based on the records and reports of earlier Chinese envoys, Ryukyuan records, and Chou's own observations
1800	Jiaqing	Zhao Wenkai 趙文楷; Li Dingyuan 李鼎元	Shō On	investitutre of king.
1808	Jiaqing	Qikun 齊鯤; Fei Xizhang 費錫章	Shō Kō	investitutre of king.
1838	Daoguang	Lin Hongnian 林鴻年; Gao Renjian 高人鑑	Shō Iku	investitutre of king.
1866	Tongzhi	Zhao Xin 趙新; Yu Guangjia 于光甲	Shō Tai	final investiture mission confirms Shō Tai as King of Ryukyu.

In the late 19th century, the Sinocentric tributary state system was superseded by the Westphalian multi-state system.

== See also ==
- Ryukyuan missions to Edo
- Ryukyuan missions to Imperial China
- Foreign relations of Imperial China
- Ryukyuan missions to Joseon
- Joseon missions to the Ryukyu Kingdom
- Kōchi Chōjō
- Rin Seikō
