= Sessei =

Ryūkyū Kingdom government position

Sessei (摂政) was the highest government post of the Ryūkyū Kingdom below the king; the sessei served the function of royal or national advisor. In the Ryukyuan language at the time, the pronunciation was closer to shisshii, and has only changed relatively recently. Though the same Chinese characters which compose the modern Okinawan word sessei are read as sesshō in Japanese, the position is not quite the same, and the Ryukyuan post is not derived from the Japanese model or system.

The sessei worked alongside the king and the Sanshikan (Council of Three) to draft and enact laws, though the king gradually became more and more of a figurehead over the course of the period when Ryūkyū was a subsidiary of the Japanese feudal domain of Satsuma (1609–1870s). Like most Ryukyuan government officials at the time, most sessei were appointed from the elite class of yukatchu, scholars of Chinese subjects from the town of Kumemura.

According to the Chūzan Seikan (中山世鑑, "Mirror of Chūzan"), the classical Ryukyuan history text by sessei Shō Shōken, the sessei have always been a part of the system of the Ryukyuan Kingdom and were originally appointed by Eiso. The three men who held the position of sessei during the first Shō Dynasty of Ryukyuan kings were Chinese, but beginning with the Second Shō Dynasty, sessei were native Ryukyuans. Royal officials, sometimes princes, would select the sessei, and the appointment would come with an appropriate rank and title, often that of "prince", despite the sessei being in essence a bureaucrat and not royalty himself. It was not uncommon for such a title to be conferred upon anyone who performed great service to the kingdom, though right of succession and other such royal rights implied by the title of "prince" did not accompany such an honor.

While most sessei essentially played the role of a bureaucrat and privileged member of the royal entourage, Shō Shōken, who held the post from 1666 to 1673, is particularly known for acting as a lawmaker, issuing a great many important and beneficial reforms during his short tenure.

== List of sessei ==
Name	In office	Kings
Eiso 英祖	1253–1259	Gihon
Aranpō 亜蘭匏	? – 1406?	Satto, Bunei
Tei Fuku 程復	1411 – ?	Shō Shishō
Ō Mō 王茂	1411 – ?	Shō Shishō
Kaiki 懐機	1428 – ?	Shō Hashi, Shō Shitatsu
Shō Kō Gushichan Wōji Chōsei 尚宏 具志頭 王子 朝盛	1589–1610	Shō Nei
Kikuin Sōi 菊隠宗意	1611 – ?	Shō Nei
Shō Hō Sashiki Wōji Chōshō 尚豊 佐敷 王子 朝昌	1617–1621	Shō Nei
Shō Sei Kin Wōji Chōtei 尚盛 金武 王子 朝貞	1629–1654	Shō Hō, Shō Shitsu
Shō Kyō Gushikawa Wōji Chōei 尚亨 具志川 王子 朝盈	1654–1666	Shō Shitsu
Shō Shōken Haneji Wōji Chōshū 尚象賢 羽地 王子 朝秀	1666–1675	Shō Shitsu, Shō Tei
Shō Kōki Ōzato Wōji Chōryō 尚弘毅 大里 王子 朝亮	1676–1686	Shō Tei
Shō Ki Kin Wōji Chōkō 尚凞 金武 王子 朝興	1688–1688	Shō Tei
Shō Kōsai Chatan Wōji Chōai 尚弘才 北谷 王子 朝愛	1689–1705	Shō Tei
Shō Kō Oroku Wōji Chōki 尚綱 小禄 王子 朝奇	1705–1712	Shō Tei, Shō Kei
Shō Yū Tomigusuku Wōji Chōkyō 尚祐 豊見城 王子 朝匡	1712–1722	Shō Kei
Shō Tetsu Chatan Wōji Chōki 尚徹 北谷 王子 朝騎	1722–1739	Shō Kei
Shō Seibo Nakijin Wōji Chōgi 尚宣謨 今帰仁 王子 朝義	1755–1770	Shō Boku
Shō Wa Yuntanza Wōji Chōkō 尚和 読谷山 王子 朝恒	1770–1785	Shō Boku
Shō To Urasoe Wōji Chōō 尚図 浦添 王子 朝央	1794–1797	Shō Boku, Shō On
Shō Shū Yoshimura Wōji Chōgi 尚周 義村 王子 朝宜	1798–1802	Shō On
Shō Tairetsu Yuntanza Wōji Chōei 尚太烈 読谷山 王子 朝英	1803–1816	Shō Sei, Shō Kō
Shō Yō Ginowan Wōji Chōshō 尚容 宜野湾 王子 朝祥	1817–1820	Shō Kō
Shō Teihan Haneji Wōji Chōbi 尚廷範 羽地 王子 朝美	1822–1831	Shō Kō
Shō Kai Tomigusuku Wōji Chōshun 尚楷 豊見城 王子 朝春	1831–1832	Shō Kō
Shō Genro Urasoe Wōji Chōki 尚元魯 浦添 王子 朝憙	1835–1852	Shō Iku, Shō Tai
Shō Ton Ōzato Wōji Chōkyō 尚惇 大里 王子 朝教	1852–1861	Shō Tai
Shō Kōkun Yonagusuku Wōji Chōki 尚宏勲 与那城 王子 朝紀	1861–1872	Shō Tai
Shō Ken Ie Wōji Chōchoku 尚健 伊江 王子 朝直	1872–1875	Shō Tai
