= Tomigusuku Chōkyō =

Prince of Ryukyu Kingdom

- 豊見城 朝匡

sessei of Ryukyu
- In office 1712–1722
- Preceded by: Oroku Chōki
- Succeeded by: Chatan Chōki

Personal details
- Parent: Tomigusuku Chōryō (father)
- Chinese name: Shō Yū (尚 祐)
- Rank: Aji, later Wōji

Tomigusuku Wōji Chōkyō (豊見城 王子 朝匡; ? – ?) also known by his Chinese style name Shō Yū (尚 祐), was a lord (Aji), later prince (Wōji) of Ryukyu Kingdom.

Prince Tomigusuku was the second head of a royal family called Tomigusuku Udun (豊見城御殿). His father was Tomigusuku Chōryō (豊見城 朝良, also known by Shō Kei 尚 経), the second son of King Shō Tei.

King Shō Eki dispatched a gratitude envoy for his accession to Edo, Japan in 1710. Prince Tomigusuku and Yoza Ankō (与座 安好, also known by Mō Bunketsu 毛 文傑) was appointed as Envoy (正使, seishi) and Deputy Envoy (副使, fukushi) respectively. They sailed back in the next year.

He served as sessei from 1712 to 1722.

Chōkyō was also the Eboshioya (烏帽子親) of King Shō Kei.

Tomigusuku Chōkyō
Preceded by Tomigusuku Chōryō	Head of Tomigusuku Udun	Succeeded by Tomigusuku Chōchō
Political offices
Preceded by Oroku Chōki	Sessei of Ryukyu; 1712 - 1722	Succeeded by Chatan Chōki
