= Misato Chōtei =

Ryukyu Kingdom prince

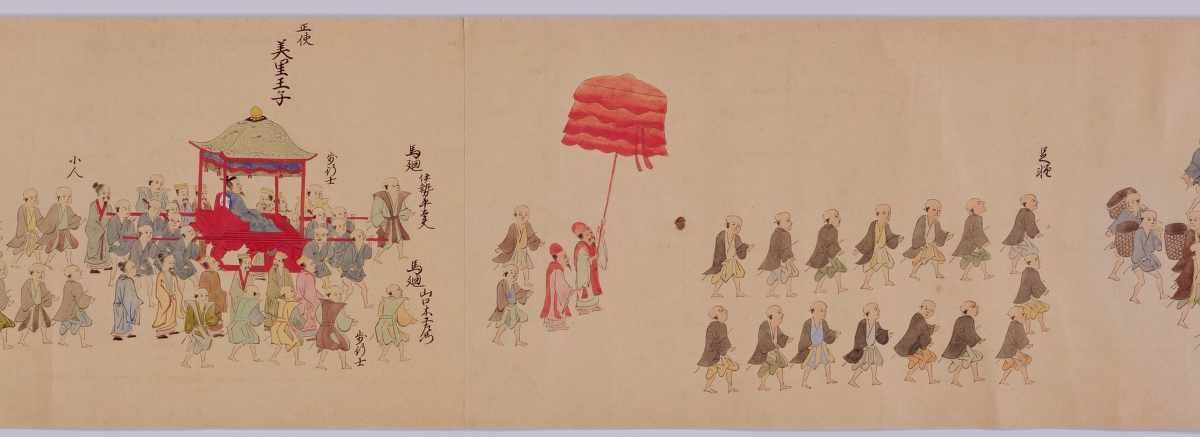
A depiction of a mission of Ryukyu to Edo in 1710. Prince Misato was the person who was depicted sit on a red palanquin on the far-left with the mark "Prince Misato" below it.

Misato Wōji Chōtei (美里 王子 朝禎; 6 July 1682 – 12 August 1711), also known by his Chinese style name Shō Ki (尚 紀), was a prince of Ryukyu Kingdom.

Prince Misato was the fourth son of King Shō Tei. His mother was Makabe Aji-ganashi (真壁按司加那志), the successor consort of King Shō Tei, so he was also a younger full-brother of Prince Oroku Chōki, a younger half-brother of Crown Prince Shō Jun, as well the half-uncle of King Shō Eki. He was the originator of royal family Ōgimi Udun (大宜見御殿).

Prince Misato was dispatched together with Tomimori Seifu (富盛 盛富, also known by Ishadō Seifu) in 1710 to celebrate Tokugawa Ienobu succeeded as shōgun of the Tokugawa shogunate. They sailed back in the next year.

Prince Misato was dispatched to celebrate Shimazu Yoshitaka (島津 吉貴) was promoted to chūjō (中将) in 1711, but his ship was shipwrecked off the coast of Yuntanza magiri (読谷山間切, modern Yomitan). He buried in Makabi grave (真嘉比墓). Prince Yonagusuku Chōchoku (与那城 朝直, also known by Shō Kan 尚 監) was dispatched to Kagoshima in place of him.

Prince Misato had no heir, and adopted Misato Chōkō (美里 朝孝), the second son of his brother Oroku Chōki, as his adopted son.

Misato Chōtei
title created	Head of Ōgimi Udun	Succeeded by Misato Chōkō
