= Ryukyuan missions to Imperial China =

Ryukyuan kings intermittently sent diplomatic missions to the Ming and Qing emperors. These diplomatic contacts were within the Sinocentric system of bilateral and multinational relationships in East Asia. A total of 347 Ryukyuan missions to China have been recorded.

== History ==
King Satto of Chūzan established formal relations with China in 1374. Satto became the first Ryukyuan king to send a mission to China. He was also the first to receive investiture and to submit to Chinese suzerainty in 1372.

The Ming and Qing archival records identify the Ryukyu Islands among the "unconquered barbarian countries" rather than among China's colonies. The Ryukyuan missions to China were managed by the Reception Department of the Board of Ceremonies rather than by some other Imperial bureau or agency.

The 500-years old tributary missions ended in the late 19th century when the Sinocentric tributary state system was superseded by the Westphalian multi-state system, i.e. in 1875 during the forced annexation period of the Ryukyu Kingdom (then Ryukyu Domain) by the Empire of Japan.

== See also ==
- Imperial Chinese missions to the Ryukyu Kingdom
- Foreign relations of Imperial China
- Ryukyuan missions to Joseon
- Joseon missions to the Ryukyu Kingdom
- Ryukyuan missions to Edo
- Ryūkyū-kan
- Kōchi Chōjō
