= Tamagawa Chōtatsu =

Tamagawa Chōtatsu prince
- 玉川 朝達
- Born: 23 March 1826
- Died: 18 February 1862 (aged 35)
- Known for: Prince of Ryukyu Kingdom

Tamagawa Wōji Chōtatsu (玉川 王子 朝達; 23 March 1826 – 18 February 1862), also known by his Chinese style name Shō Shin (尚 慎), was a prince of Ryukyu Kingdom.

Prince Tamagawa was the seventh son of King Shō Kō. He was also a half-brother of King Shō Iku, Prince Ōzato Chōkyō and Prince Ie Chōchoku. Nakazato Chōkei (仲里 朝慶) had no heir and adopted him. After Chōei's death, he became 14th head of the royal family Tamagawa Udun (玉川御殿), and inherited the hereditary fief of his family, Kanegusuku magiri (兼城間切, modern a part of Itoman, Okinawa).

King Shō Tai dispatched a gratitude envoy after he took power to Edo, Japan in 1850. Prince Tamagawa and Nomura Chōgi (野村 朝宜, also known by Shō Genmo 向 元模) were appointed Envoy (正使, seishi) and Deputy Envoy (副使, fukushi) respectively. They sailed back in the next year.

Prince Tamagawa kept in close touch with the pro-Satsuma faction, including Makishi Chōchū, Onga Chōkō and Oroku Ryōchū. It was said that they planned to depose King Shō Tai and install him. In 1859, Makishi, Onga and Oroku were involved in the Makishi Onga Incident (牧志恩河事件) and arrested. Prince Ie was appointed as judge to interrogate them. Prince Ōzato suggested that Prince Tamagawa should be put into prison, but was dissuaded by the king's instructor, Tsuhako Seisei. Prince Tamagawa was banned from politics and under house arrest. He died in the same year.

Tamagawa Chōtatsu
| Preceded by Nakazato Chōkei | Head of Tamagawa Udun | Succeeded by Tamagawa Chōjō |
