= Gushikawa Chōei =

Sessei of Ryukyu

- 具志川朝盈

sessei of Ryūkyū
- In office 1654–1666
- Preceded by: Kin Chōtei
- Succeeded by: Haneji Chōshū

Personal details
- Born: January 4, 1610
- Died: Unknown
- Parent: Shō Kyū (father)
- Chinese name: Shō Kyō (尚亨)
- Rank: Wōji
- Nickname: Seijin Aji-ganashi (聖人按司加那志)

Gushikawa Wōji Chōei (具志川王子朝盈; 4 January 1610 – ?), also known by Kume-Gushikawa Wōji Chōei (久米具志川王子朝盈) and his Chinese style name Shō Kyō (尚亨), was a member of the royal family of the Ryukyu Kingdom who served as sessei, a post often translated as "prime minister", from 1654 to 1666.

Gushikawa Chōei was the seventh son of Kin Chōkō and Shuriōkimi Aji-ganashi. He was also a half-brother of King Shō Hō. After Shō Shitsu succeeded the throne, he led a mission Edo in 1649.

Gushikawa Chōei was also the author of Ishinagu nu uta, a ryūka poem/song known for its striking thematic similarity to Kimigayo, the national anthem of Japan.

Gushikawa Chōei
Preceded by Kume-Gushikawa Chōtsū	Head of Goeku Udun ? － ?	Succeeded by Kume-Nagagusuku Chōsei
Political offices
Preceded by Kin Chōtei	Sessei of Ryukyu; 1654 - 1666	Succeeded by Haneji Chōshū
