= Ginowan Chōshō =

Ryukyuan prince (1765–1827)

- 宜野湾 朝祥

sessei of Ryukyu
- In office 1817–1820
- Preceded by: Yuntanza Chōei
- Succeeded by: Haneji Chōbi

Personal details
- Born: July 19, 1765
- Died: November 4, 1827 (aged 62)
- Parent: Shō Boku (father)
- Chinese name: Shō Yō (尚 容)
- Rank: Wōji

Ginowan Wōji Chōshō (宜野湾 王子 朝祥; 19 July 1765 – 4 November 1827), also known by Ginowan Chōyō (宜野湾 朝陽) and his Chinese style name Shō Yō (尚 容), was a prince of Ryukyu Kingdom.

Prince Ginowan was the fourth son of King Shō Boku. He was also a half-brother of Crown Prince Shō Tetsu and Prince Urasoe Chōō, and a full-brother of Prince Yoshimura Chōgi.

Prince Ginowan was adopted by Gushichan Chōken (具志頭 朝憲). Later, he became the tenth head of Oroku Udun (小禄御殿).

He was dispatched together with Kōchi Ryōtoku (幸地 良篤, also known by Ba Kokugi 馬 克義) in 1790 to celebrate Tokugawa Ienari accede as shōgun of the Tokugawa shogunate. They sailed back in the next year.

Prince Ginowan had no heir, and adopted Shō Kō, the fourth son of Crown Prince Shō Tetsu, as his adopted son. After King Shō Sei died young in 1803, he gave up his fatherhood. Shō Kō was still regarded as a son of Shō Tetsu and was able to ascend the throne. King Shō Kō had a good relationship with him, and gave presents to him at every new year and birthday.

Prince Gonowan served as sessei from 1817 to 1820. He was designated as a member of the Okinawan Thirty-Six Immortals of Poetry (沖縄三十六歌仙, Okinawa Sanjūrokkasen).

Ginowan Chōshō
Preceded by Gushichan Chōken	Head of Oroku Udun	Succeeded by Oroku Chōkō
Political offices
Preceded by Yuntanza Chōei	Sessei of Ryukyu; 1817–1820	Succeeded by Haneji Chōbi
