= Urasoe Anzō =

Ryukyuan bureaucrat (died 1759)

- 浦添 安蔵

sanshikan of Ryukyu
- In office 1755–1759
- Preceded by: Fukuyama Chōken
- Succeeded by: Ikegusuku Anmei

Personal details
- Born: Unknown
- Died: 12 November 1759
- Chinese name: Mō Bunwa (毛 文和)
- Rank: Ueekata

Urasoe Ueekata Anzō (浦添 親方 安蔵; ? – 12 November 1759) also known by Kohatsu Ueekata Anzō (古波津 親方 安蔵) and his Chinese style name Mō Bunwa (毛 文和), was a bureaucrat of Ryukyu Kingdom.

King Shō Boku dispatched a gratitude envoy for his accession to Edo, Japan in 1752. Prince Nakijin Chōchū (also known by Nakijin Chōgi) and he was appointed as Envoy (正使, seishi) and Deputy Envoy (副使, fukushi) respectively. They sailed back in the next year.

He served as a member of Sanshikan from 1755 to 1759.

Political offices
Preceded by Fukuyama Chōken	Sanshikan of Ryukyu; 1755 - 1759	Succeeded by Ikegusuku Anmei
