= Nakijin Chōgi =

Ryukyuan royal (1702–1787)

- 今帰仁 朝義

sessei of Ryukyu
- In office 1755–1770
- Preceded by: Chatan Chōki
- Succeeded by: Yuntanza Chōkō

Personal details
- Born: December 20, 1702
- Died: October 7, 1787 (aged 84)
- Parent(s): Nakijin Chōki (father); Manabetaru (mother)
- Chinese name: Shō Seibo (尚 宣謨)
- Rank: Wōji

Nakijin Wōji Chōgi (今帰仁 王子 朝義; 20 December 1702 – 7 October 1787), also known by Nakijin Wōji Chōchū (今帰仁 王子 朝忠) and his Chinese style name Shō Seibo (尚 宣謨), was a royal of Ryukyu Kingdom.

Prince Nakijin was the tenth head of the royal family Gushichan Udun (具志川御殿). His ancestors had been offered hereditary office "Warden of Hokuzan" (北山監守, Hokuzan Kanshu) for a long time. He was the eldest son of Nakijin Chōki (今帰仁 朝季); his mother was a mukei (無系, "commoner") called Manabetaru (真鍋樽). His rank was Aji (lord) at first. In 1747, he was elevated to the rank Wōji (prince), which was the highest rank among royals.

He was granted Nakijin magiri (今帰仁間切, modern Nakijin, Okinawa) as his hereditary fief in 1724. He was also granted Nakijin Castle in 1742, and built a memorial stele, Sanhoku Nakijin-jō kanshu rairekihi (山北今帰仁城監守来歴碑), in the castle to commemorate it. Now the stele it still standing in the castle and is recognized Tangible Cultural Property of Okinawa Prefecture in 2002.

King Shō Boku dispatched a gratitude envoy for his accession to Edo, Japan in 1752. Prince Nakijin and Kohatsu Anzō was appointed as Envoy (正使, seishi) and Deputy Envoy (副使, fukushi) respectively. They sailed back in the next year.

Prince Nakijin served as sessei from 1755 to 1770.

Nakijin Chōgi
Preceded by Nakijin Chōki	Head of Gushichan Udun	Succeeded by Nakijin Chōshō
Political offices
Preceded by Chatan Chōki	Sessei of Ryukyu; 1755 - 1770	Succeeded by Yuntanza Chōkō
