= Chatan =

Chatan may refer to:

- Chatan, Iran, a village in Iran
- Qolqoleh-ye Chatan, a village in Iran
- Chatan, Okinawa, a town in Japan
- Chatan (surname)
