= Ōzato Chōkyō =

- 大里 朝教

sessei of Ryukyu
- In office 1852–1861
- Preceded by: Urasoe Chōki
- Succeeded by: Yonagusuku Chōki

Personal details
- Born: January 21, 1816
- Died: Unknown
- Parent: Shō Kō (father)
- Chinese name: Shō Ton (尚 惇)
- Rank: Wōji

Ōzato Wōji Chōkyō (大里 王子 朝教; 21 January 1816 – ?) also known by his Chinese style name Shō Ton (尚 惇), was a prince of Ryukyu Kingdom.

Prince Ōzato was the third son of King Shō Kō, and was a half-brother of King Shō Iku. He was given Ōzato magiri (part of modern Nanjō), and established a new royal family: Ōzato Udun (大里御殿).

He served as sessei from 1852 to 1861. In 1859, Makishi Chōchū, Onga Chōkō, Oroku Ryōchū and Prince Tamagawa Chōtatsu were involved in illegal matter (Makishi Onga Incident), and Prince Ie Chōchoku was appointed as judge to interrogate them. Prince Ōzato supported Prince Ie to convict them.

After this incident, Prince Ōzato retired in 1861. His position turned to Yonagusuku Chōki.

Ōzato Chōkyō
title created	Head of Ōzato Udun	Succeeded by Ōzato Chōyō
Political offices
Preceded by Urasoe Chōki	Sessei of Ryukyu; 1852 - 1861	Succeeded by Yonagusuku Chōki
