= Yonagusuku Chōki =

- 与那城 朝紀

sessei of Ryukyu
- In office 1861–1872
- Preceded by: Ōzato Chōkyō
- Succeeded by: Ie Chōchoku

Personal details
- Chinese name: Shō Injō (尚 允譲)
- Rank: Wōji

Yonagusuku Wōji Chōki (与那城 王子 朝紀; ? – ?) also known by Nakazato Aji Chōki (仲里 按司 朝紀) and his Chinese style name Shō Injō (尚 允譲), was a prince of Ryukyu Kingdom.

He was born to a royal family called Yonagusuku Udun (与那城御殿). He was an adopted son of Namihira Chōbu (波平 朝武). Later, Chōki became the seventh head of Yonagusuku Udun.

Makishi Chōchū, Onga Chōkō, Oroku Ryōchū and Prince Tamagawa Chōtatsu were involved in illegal matter in 1859, Chōki was appointed as judge together with Prince Ie Chōchoku, Mabuni Kenyu (摩文仁 賢由), Uza Chōshin (宇座 朝真) to interrogate them. This incident was known as Makishi Onga Incident (牧志恩河事件).

Chōki served as sessei from 1861 to 1872.

Yonagusuku Chōki
Preceded by Namihira Chōbu	Head of Yonagusuku Udun	Succeeded by Yonagusuku Chōchi
Political offices
Preceded by Ōzato Chōkyō	Sessei of Ryukyu; 1861 - 1872	Succeeded by Ie Chōchoku
