= Haedong chegukki =

1471 Korean text by Shin Suk-ju

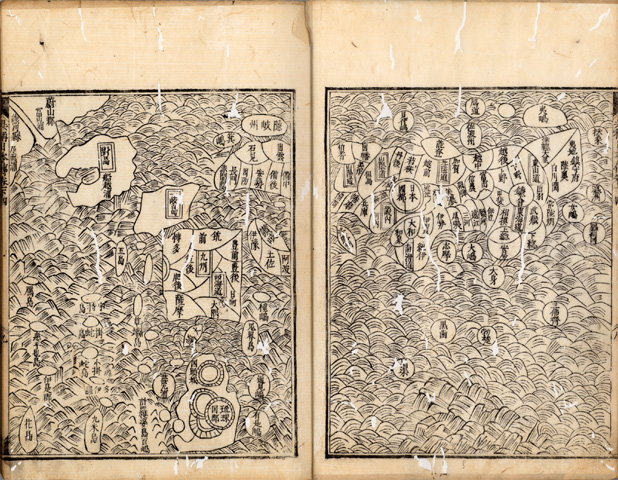

Korean name
- Hangul: 해동제국기
- Hanja: 海東諸國紀
- RR: Haedong jegukgi
- MR: Haedong chegukki

Haedong chegukki (Korean: 해동제국기; Hanja: 海東諸國紀) or Records of Countries Across the Sea to the East is a fifteenth-century Korean text on relations between Joseon, Japan, and the Ryūkyū Kingdom. Compiled by government officials c. 1470–71, it was presented to King Seongjong early in 1472; though this manuscript is now lost, an expanded printed version of 1512 is still extant. This later printed version includes a chronicle of the Emperors of Japan, a gazetteer of Japan, and maps of Japan and Ryūkyū.

== See also ==
- Joseon missions to Japan
- Joseon missions to the Ryūkyū Kingdom
- Japanese missions to Joseon
- Ryūkyūan missions to Joseon
- Sin Sukju
