= Yuntanza Chōei =

- 読谷山 朝英

sessei of Ryukyu
- In office 1803–1817
- Preceded by: Yoshimura Chōgi
- Succeeded by: Ginowan Chōshō

Personal details
- Born: January 26, 1768
- Died: February 8, 1817 (aged 49)
- Parent: Yuntanza Chōken (father)
- Chinese name: Shō Tairetsu (尚 大烈)
- Rank: Wōji

Yuntanza Wōji Chōei (読谷山 王子 朝英; 26 January 1768 – 8 February 1817), also known by Yuntanza Chōchoku (読谷山 朝敕) and his Chinese style name Shō Tairetsu (尚 大烈), was a prince of Ryukyu Kingdom.

Prince Yuntanza was the second head of a royal family called Yuntanza Udun (読谷山御殿). His father was Yuntanza Chōken.

King Shō Kō dispatched a gratitude envoy for his accession to Edo, Japan in 1806. Prince Yuntanza and Oroku Ryōwa was appointed as Envoy (正使, seishi) and Deputy Envoy (副使, fukushi) respectively. They sailed back in the next year.

He served as sessei from 1803 to 1816. He was designated as a member of the Okinawan Thirty-Six Immortals of Poetry (沖縄三十六歌仙, Okinawa Sanjūrokkasen).

Yuntanza Chōei
Preceded by Yuntanza Chōken	Head of Yuntanza Udun	Succeeded by Yuntanza Chōyō
Political offices
Preceded by Yoshimura Chōgi	Sessei of Ryukyu; 1803 - 1817	Succeeded by Ginowan Chōshō
