= Yuntanza Chōken =

Prince of Ryukyu

- 読谷山 朝憲

sessei of Ryukyu
- In office 1770–1785
- Preceded by: Nakijin Chōgi
- Succeeded by: Urasoe Chōō

Personal details
- Born: April 18, 1745
- Died: February 25, 1811 (aged 65)
- Parent(s): Shō Kei (father); Jinshitsu, Kikoe-ōgimi-ganashi (mother)
- Chinese name: Shō Wa (尚 和)
- Rank: Wōji

Yuntanza Wōji Chōken (読谷山 王子 朝憲; 18 April 1745 – 25 February 1811), also known by Yuntanza Chōkō (読谷山 朝恒) and his Chinese style name Shō Wa (尚 和), was a prince of Ryukyu Kingdom.

Prince Yuntanza was the second son of King Shō Kei, and was a full-brother of King Shō Boku. He was given Yuntanza magiri (読谷山間切, modern Yomitan) as his hereditary fief, and established a new royal family: Yuntanza Udun (読谷山御殿).

Prince Yuntanza was dispatched along with Wakugawa Chōkyō (湧川 朝喬, also known by Shō Hōten 向 邦鼎) in 1764 to celebrate Tokugawa Ieharu's success as shōgun of the Tokugawa shogunate. They sailed back in the next year.

He served as sessei from 1770 to 1785. He was good at Ryūka and was designated as a member of the Okinawan Thirty-Six Immortals of Poetry (沖縄三十六歌仙, Okinawa Sanjūrokkasen).

Yuntanza Chōken
title created	Head of Yuntanza Udun	Succeeded by Yuntanza Chōei
Political offices
Preceded by Nakijin Chōgi	Sessei of Ryukyu; 1770–1785	Succeeded by Urasoe Chōō
