= Chatan (surname) =

Chatan (Okinawan: 北谷) is an ancient Okinawan surname and this surname is read Kitatani in Japanese nowadays. Notable people with the surname include:

- Chatan Chōai (1650–1719), prince of Ryukyu Kingdom, Japan
- Chatan Chōchō (1607–1667), bureaucrat of Ryukyu Kingdom, Japan
- Chatan Chōki (1703–1739), prince of Ryukyu Kingdom, Japan
- Chatan Yara (1668–1756), Ryukyuan martial artist
