= Aranpō =

Ryukyuan politician of Chūzan

Aranpō (亜蘭匏; fl. 1382 - 1398), also known by Yalanpao, was a politician and diplomat of Chūzan Kingdom.

It was hard to know his background. Some historian thought he was a Chinese descendant and lived in Kumemura, but few Chinese used the family name 亜. Some thought he was a Ryukyuan, and "Aranpō" was a corruption of Iraha (伊良波). Even some historians thought he was an Arab.

His name was mentioned in Chūzan Seifu in 1382 for the first time. In this year, he was sent to Ming China by Satto to pay tribute together with Taiki. Later, he was sent to China several times. Satto requested Hongwu Emperor to give Aranpō an official position. It was approved by the emperor. Aranpō was appointed Kokushō (国相, "Chief Minister") of Ryukyu and elevated to the Senior Fifth Rank (正五品), placed him on par with Zhangshi (長史, "Chief Clerk") officials in China.

Aranpō still served as Kokushō during Bunei's reign. His name was mentioned in Chūzan Seifu in 1398 for the last time. In this year, he was sent to Ming China by Bunei to pay tribute, Hongwu Emperor bestowed the king and his ministers kanfuku (官服).

Political offices
Vacant Title last held by Eiso	Sessei of Ryukyu ? - ?	Succeeded by Tei Fuku?
