= Yoshimura Chōgi (prince) =

- 義村 朝宜

sessei of Ryukyu
- In office 1798–1802
- Preceded by: Urasoe Chōō
- Succeeded by: Yuntanza Chōei

Personal details
- Born: August 12, 1763
- Died: August 29, 1821 (aged 58)
- Parent: Shō Boku (father)
- Chinese name: Shō Shū (尚 周)
- Rank: Wōji

Yoshimura Wōji Chōgi (義村 王子 朝宜; 12 August 1763 – 29 August 1821), also known by his Chinese style name Shō Shū (尚 周), was a prince of Ryukyu Kingdom.

Prince Yoshimura was the third son of King Shō Boku. He was also a half-brother of Crown Prince Shō Tetsu and Prince Urasoe Chōō, and a full-brother of Prince Ginowan Chōshō.

He was given Katsuren magiri (勝連間切, modern part of Uruma) as his hereditary fief in 1771. He was bestowed the title "Prince Yoshimura" instead of "Prince Katsuren" because the character "勝" (katsu, means "victory") was not allowed to use in name. Prince Yoshimura established a new royal family: Yoshimura Udun (義村御殿).

Prince Yoshimura served as sessei from 1798 to 1802.

Yoshimura Chōgi (prince)
title created	Head of Yoshimura Udun	Succeeded by Yoshimura Chōboku
Political offices
Preceded by Urasoe Chōō	Sessei of Ryukyu; 1798 - 1802	Succeeded by Yuntanza Chōei
