= Cheng Fu =

Cheng Fu may refer to:

- Tei Fuku (1330–?), Chinese-born minister of the Ryukyu Kingdom
- Cheng Fu (gymnast) (born 1946), Chinese-born Taiwanese gymnast
