= Kin Chōtei =

Royal of the Ryukyu Kingdom

- 金武 朝貞

sessei of Ryukyu
- In office 1629–1654
- Preceded by: Shō Hō
- Succeeded by: Gushikawa Chōei

Personal details
- Born: 1600
- Died: 1663 (aged 62–63)
- Parent: Shō Kyū (father)
- Chinese name: Shō Sei (尚 盛)
- Rank: Wōji

Kin Wōji Chōtei (金武 王子 朝貞; 1600 – 1663), also known by his Chinese style name Shō Sei (尚 盛), was a royal of Ryukyu Kingdom.

Kin Chōtei was the second head of a royal family called Kin Udun (金武御殿). He was the fourth son of Shō Kyū (Prince Kin Chōkō), and also a younger brother of King Shō Hō. He served as sessei from 1629 to 1654.

Prince Kin was dispatched to Satsuma for several times. He was dispatched as gratitude envoy for King Shō Hō's taking power to Edo, Japan in 1634. He went to Edo together with Prince Sashiki Chōeki (佐敷 朝益, also known by Shō Bun 尚 文), who was congratulatory envoy to celebrate Tokugawa Iemitsu succeeded as shōgun of the Tokugawa shogunate. They sailed back at the end of this year.

Prince Kin brought tea seeds from Satsuma to Ryukyu, and planted them in Kanna village (漢那村) of Kin magiri (金武間切, modern Kin, Ginoza, Okinawa). From then on, Ryukyu began to plant tea plants.

Kin Chōtei
Preceded by Shō Kyū (Kin Chōkō)	Head of Kin Udun	Succeeded by Chatan Chōshū
Political offices
Preceded by Shō Hō (Sashiki Chōshō)	Sessei of Ryukyu; 1629–1654	Succeeded by Gushikawa Chōei
