= Shō Shōken =

Sessei of the Ryukyu Kingdom

Haneji Chōshū
- 羽地 朝秀

sessei of Ryukyu
- In office 1666–1675
- Monarchs: Shō Shitsu; Shō Tei
- Preceded by: Gushikawa Chōei
- Succeeded by: Ōzato Chōryō

Personal details
- Born: June 6, 1617
- Died: January 5, 1676 (aged 58)
- Resting place: Tomb of Haneji Chōshū
- Childhood name: Umigami (思亀)
- Chinese name: Go Shōken (呉 象賢), later Shō Shōken (向 象賢)
- Rank: Ōji

Shō Shōken (向 象賢; 1617–1675), also known as Haneji Ōji Chōshū (羽地 王子 朝秀), was a Ryukyuan scholar and served as sessei, a post often translated as "prime minister," from 1666 to 1673. Shō wrote the first history of the Ryukyu Kingdom, Chūzan Seikan (中山世鑑; "Mirror of Chūzan"), and enacted a number of practical political reforms aimed at improving Ryukyu's prosperity and dignity in the eyes of China and Japan.

== Background ==
Shō Shōken was born as the first son of Haneji Ōji Chōtai (Prince Chōtai Haneji), the third head of Haneji Udun (Palace). Haneji Udun was one of the cadet branches of Royal House. Shō Shōken inherited the position of jitō (地頭; District Administrator) from Chōtai in 1640, and began compiling the Mirror of Chūzan in 1650, by the orders of the king Shō Shitsu. According to Haneji shioki (The Directives of Haneji), one of his chief collections of reforms, he was approached in 1666 by a royal messenger, who was sent to offer him the position of sessei (prime minister). Shō refused, demanding that it was inappropriate for such an important appointment to be conveyed by such a lowly messenger. The following day, Inoha Ueekata, a member of the Sanshikan (三司官, Council of Three), arrived to make the same offer, which he accepted immediately.

Shō Shōken's writings, in particular the Mirror of Chūzan, indicate a favor for the lords of Satsuma, the Japanese daimyō to whom all of Ryukyu was a vassal. It is unclear the extent to which he wrote of them favorably out of fear of reprisal for criticizing them, or out of a genuinely positive view of their customs and politics. Nevertheless, in his writings and in his political behavior, Shō displayed a strong desire for Ryukyu to emulate Japan more fully, which also calls into question the accuracy of his history since elements appear to have been altered to fit better with the Japanese world view. Adopting Japanese customs more outwardly, in terms of language and dress, was made impossible by the need to hide Japanese control or influence in Ryukyu in order to maintain good relations with China. However, Shō sought to minimize as much as possible any elements of Ryukyuan custom which could be seen as backwards or undignified in the eyes of Satsuma; he removed the royalty from participation in many traditional rites, and as a result allowed these rites to be much smaller and less extravagant. This also served the important effect of reducing extravagant spending, and allowing Ryukyu to be more productive and prosperous. In a similar vein, he punished aristocrats and government officials who lived too extravagant a lifestyle; the aristocracy and peasantry both were living beyond their means for much of the early 17th century, a trend which led to widespread poverty.

He worked to sideline the royalty and the noro (female priestesses central to Ryukyuan religion), not out of a desire for power, or to suppress native religion, but in order to cut down on extravagance and on practices which could be perceived as undignified to the Japanese. Ultimately, for all his philosophical writings, Shō was a pragmatist.

Shō Shōken was also a strong believer in Confucianism, having studied under Tonami Jochiku, who in turn studied under the master Nanpo Bunshi. Confucianist views on benevolent leadership and overall morality pervade Shō's writings and his policies. However, his views are also in line with the concept called tintoo in Okinawan and tendō (天道, lit. "way of heaven") in Japanese. His telling of Ryukyuan history, through recounting a lineage of kings, makes use of this concept extensively; it is very similar and closely related to that of the Mandate of Heaven in China. Kings who were poor or malevolent rulers were overthrown by those who were backed by the Way of Heaven.

In writing the first history of the Ryukyu Kingdom, his political goals and/or cultural views are quite evident. He paints Ryukyu as being a loyal vassal to Satsuma long before the 1609 invasion, which was done primarily out of desire, on the part of the lords of Satsuma and the Tokugawa shogunate, for wealth and power, allowing them a way to maintain the isolation of feudal Japan while doing behind-the-scenes trading with other countries via the Ryukyu Islands. He blames the invasion on Ryukyuan disloyalty and neglect of their feudal obligations to their benevolent lords (Satsuma), and on a corrupt government official named Tei Dō (Okinawan: Jana Ueekata) who Shō Shōken claims led the people astray. In this light, he seeks favor by claiming that the benevolent lords of Satsuma had no choice but to invade as a chastisement for Ryukyu's disloyalty.

One of the most influential leaders and reformers of the Ryukyu Kingdom, Shō Shōken stepped down from his post in 1673 and died two years later.

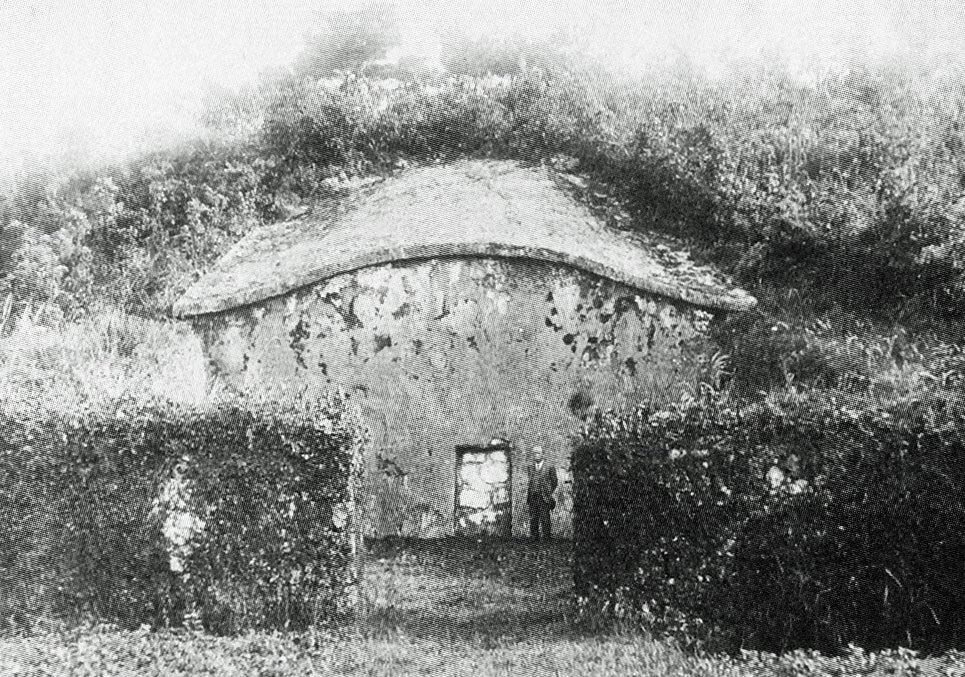
Tomb in Taishō era.

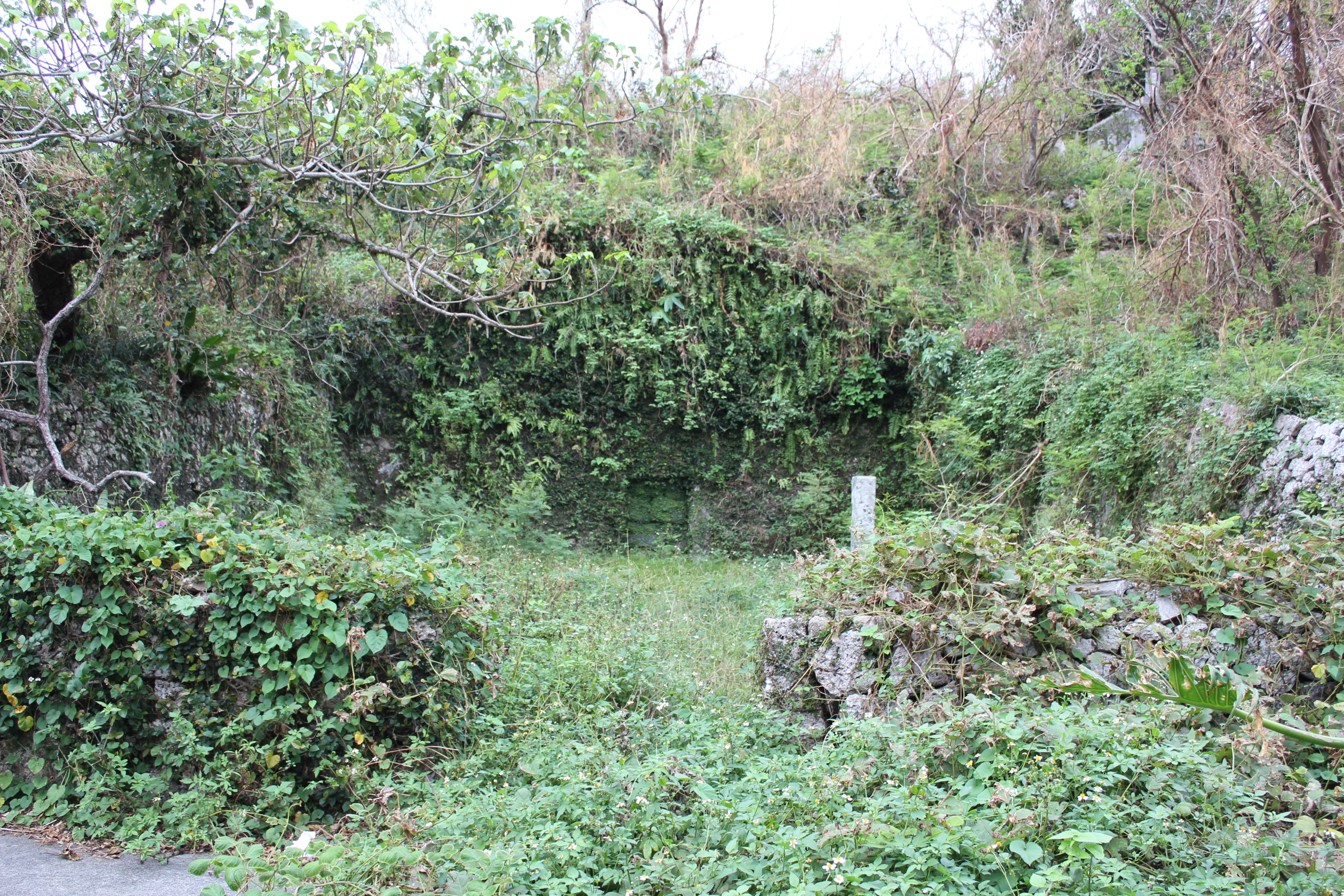
Tomb in 2012.

Shō Shōken
Preceded by Haneji Chōtai	Head of Haneji Udun	Succeeded by Haneji Chōji
Political offices
Preceded by Gushikawa Chōei	Sessei of Ryukyu; 1666–1675	Succeeded by Ōzato Chōryō
