= Chatan Chōki =

Prince of the Ryukyu Kingdom (1703–1739)

- 北谷 朝騎

sessei of Ryukyu
- In office 1722–1739
- Preceded by: Tomigusuku Chōkyō
- Succeeded by: Nakijin Chōgi

Personal details
- Born: September 16, 1703
- Died: March 27, 1739 (aged 35)
- Parent(s): Shō Eki (father); Konkō, Kikoe-ōgimi-ganashi (mother)
- Chinese name: Shō Tetsu (尚 徹)
- Rank: Wōji

Chatan Wōji Chōki (北谷 王子 朝騎; 16 September 1703 – 27 March 1739), also known by his Chinese style name Shō Tetsu (尚 徹), was a prince of the Ryukyu Kingdom.

Chatan Chōki was the second son of King Shō Eki, and was also a younger brother of King Shō Kei. He became the adopted son of Chatan Chōai because Chōai had no heir. After Chōai died in 1719, he became the second head of a royal family called Ufumura Udun (大村御殿).

Chōki was skilled at writing Waka and Classical Chinese poetry. According to the Zhongshan Chuanxin lu (中山傳信錄), Chinese envoys came to Ryukyu to install Shō Kei as the new king in 1720. Chōki wrote a Chinese poem to the Deputy Envoy (副使) Xu Baoguang (徐 葆光). Xu also wrote a poem in response.

Chōki served as sessei from 1722 to 1739. During his term, he supported Sai On's reform, and signed many laws. Like his adopted father, he died without an heir.

The name "Prince Chatan" appeared in an Okinawan folktale: Mimi kiri bōzu (耳切り坊主, "A monk whose ears were cut off"). In this folktale, Prince Chatan was skilled at go. He killed Kurogane zasu (黒金座主), a Vajrayana Buddhist monk, and was cursed, all his sons died young. The prototype of "Prince Chatan" is unclear. Some scholars considered him to be Chatan Chōki. Sai On supported Confucianism and suppressed Buddhism in his reform. Many Buddhists hated Sai On but dared not to satirize him, so they wove a tale to attack Chatan Chōki, who was an important supporter of Sai On. But others considered "Prince Chatan" to be Chatan Chōai, the adopted father of Chōki.

Chatan Chōki
Preceded by Chatan Chōai	Head of Ufumura Udun	Succeeded by Ufumura Chōei
Political offices
Preceded by Tomigusuku Chōkyō	Sessei of Ryukyu; 1722 - 1739	Succeeded by Nakijin Chōgi
