= Urasoe Chōō =

Prince of the Ryukyu Kingdom

- 浦添 朝央

sessei of Ryukyu
- In office 1794–1797
- Preceded by: Yuntanza Chōken
- Succeeded by: Yoshimura Chōgi

Personal details
- Born: December 20, 1762
- Died: November 9, 1797 (aged 34)
- Parent(s): Shō Boku (father); Shukutoku, Sashiki Ajiganashi (mother)
- Chinese name: Shō To (尚 図)
- Rank: Wōji

Urasoe Wōji Chōō (浦添 王子 朝央; 20 December 1762 – 9 November 1797) also known by his Chinese style name Shō To (尚 図), was a prince of the Ryukyu Kingdom.

Prince Urasoe was the second son of King Shō Boku. He was a full-brother of Crown Prince Shō Tetsu, and also a half-brother of Prince Yoshimura Chōgi and Prince Ginowan Chōshō. He was given Urasoe magiri (浦添間切, modern Urasoe, Okinawa) as his hereditary fief, and established a new royal family: Urasoe Udun (浦添御殿).

Prince Urasoe served as sessei from 1794 to 1797. He was good at waka poetry.

Urasoe Chōō
title created	Head of Urasoe Udun	Succeeded by Urasoe Chōei
Political offices
Preceded by Yuntanza Chōken	Sessei of Ryukyu; 1794 - 1797	Succeeded by Yoshimura Chōgi
