= Ryukyuan missions to Edo =

Historical diplomatic missions in present-day Japan

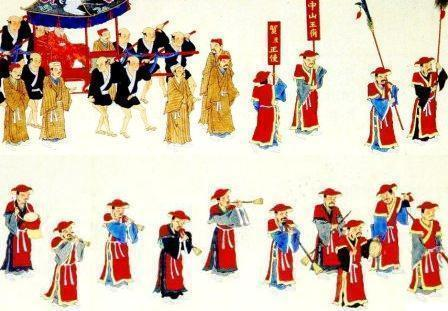
The 1710 mission was one of the largest; in this scroll a Japanese printer depicts Ryukyuan guards and a music band escorting the envoy and his officials through Edo.

Over the course of Japan's Edo period, the Ryūkyū Kingdom sent eighteen missions to Edo (琉球江戸上り, Okinawan:Idu-nubui; "lit. 'the going up of Ryūkyū to Edo'), the capital of Tokugawa Japan. The unique pattern of these diplomatic exchanges evolved from models established by the Chinese, but without denoting any predetermined relationship to China or to the Chinese world order. The Kingdom became a vassal to the Japanese feudal domain (han) of Satsuma following Satsuma's 1609 invasion of Ryūkyū, and as such were expected to pay tribute to the shogunate; the missions also served as a great source of prestige for Satsuma, the only han to claim any foreign polity, let alone a kingdom, as its vassal.

== Evolving relationships ==
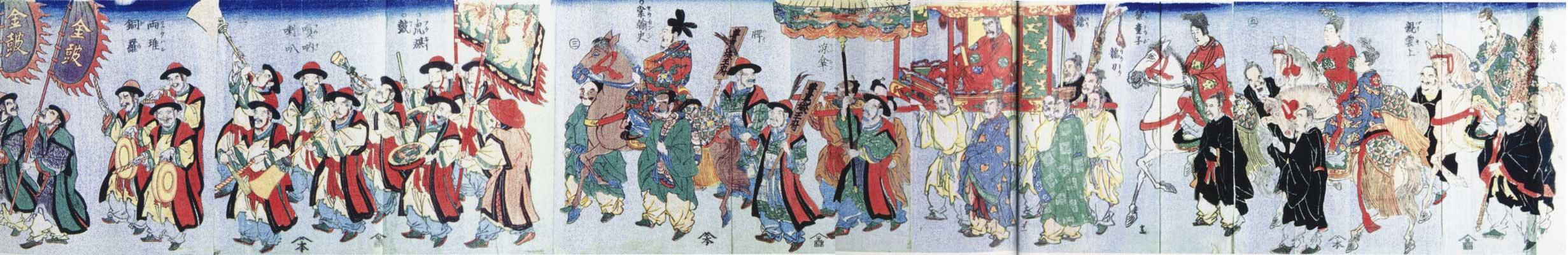
The Ryukyuan mission of 1832

Royal princes or top-ranking officials in the royal government served as chief envoys, and were accompanied by merchants, craftsmen, scholars, and other government officials as they journeyed first by sea to the Ryūkyū-kan (琉球館) in Kagoshima, an institution which served a role similar to a consulate for the Ryūkyū Kingdom, and then on by land to Edo. Missions traveled as a part of Satsuma's regular missions to Edo under the sankin kōtai system, the Ryūkyūan envoys and their entourage considerably outnumbered by the Japanese envoys and entourage from Satsuma, and were housed in the Shimazu clan residences during their time in Edo. Even so, they were still regarded as diplomatic missions from a foreign country. This was reflected in the envoys' reception in Edo, in the associated rituals and meetings. Ryūkyū was, however, regarded as being quite low in the hierarchy of foreign countries in the shogunate's world view. While the Ryūkyūan embassies paralleled in many ways those sent by Joseon Dynasty Korea in the same period, various aspects of the Ryūkyūan envoys' reception reflected their lower status in the shogunate's view. Since envoys from both Korea and Ryūkyū were not equals with the shōgun, intermediaries represented the shogunate in meetings with the envoys; while Korean envoys met with members of various high-ranking families (the kōke), envoys from Ryūkyū were met by a lower-ranking master of ceremonies, the sōshaban.

The nature and composition of these Ryūkyūan missions to Edo evolved over the course of time. The earliest Ryūkyūan mission was received in Kyoto in 1451 (Hōtoku 3, 7th month ) Mention of this diplomatic event is among the first of its type to be published in the West in an 1832 French version of Sangoku Tsūran Zusetsu (三国通覧図説, An Illustrated Description of Three Countries) by Hayashi Shihei. The essential character of these diplomatic expeditions mirrored the Ryūkyūan embassies to the Qing court in Beijing. The best extant description of these embassies is found in Tsūkō ichiran, compiled by Hayashi Akira in 1853. Japanese modifications to the well-established concepts and patterns of foreign relations of Imperial China developed as conditions changed.

Every mission was conducted either to congratulate a new shōgun on his succession or in connection with the accession of a new king of Ryūkyū. In the latter case, approval and formal recognition of the new king would be formally requested of both the Shimazu clan lords of Satsuma and of the shogunate, but the request was essentially simply a matter of ritual, and none were ever denied.

Extensive efforts were made to stress the foreignness of the costume, language, customs and art of the Ryūkyū Kingdom, emphasizing the glory and power of the Shimazu clan of the Satsuma Domain, the only daimyōs (feudal lords) in Japan to enjoy the fealty of a foreign kingdom. The missions served a similar function for the shogunate at times, helping to create the image that the shōgun's power and influence extended overseas. The third Tokugawa shōgun, Tokugawa Iemitsu, called for an embassy to be sent from Ryūkyū in 1634, as his predecessor Tokugawa Hidetada had done with a Korean embassy in 1617, to provide a show for the Imperial court and daimyōs of the shōgun's power.

== Cultural impacts ==
Numerous woodblock prints and paintings of the exotic and brightly colored costumes and banners of the Ryūkyū delegation were produced, and bought and sold by commoners and samurai alike.

== Missions chronology ==
=== 1609–1611 ===
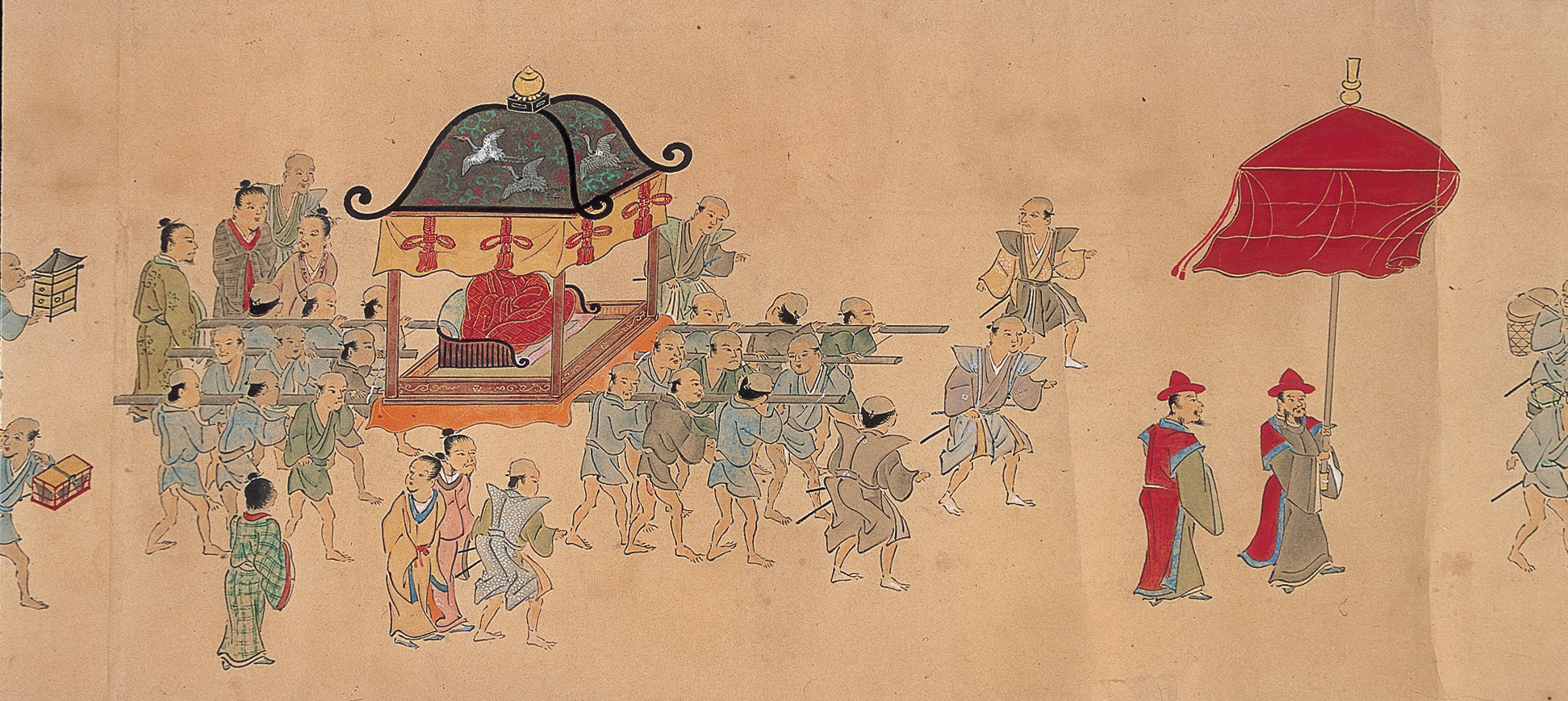
The first Ryukyuan mission to Edo

The Kingdom of Ryūkyū was invaded by forces from the Satsuma Domain in the 12th year of Keichō (1609). King Shō Nei and a number of royal advisors and government officials were taken back to Kagoshima and then to Sunpu, where they met with retired shōgun Tokugawa Ieyasu. The delegation continued north to Edo for a formal audience in the shogunal court of Tokugawa Hidetada. Upon returning to Kagoshima, the king and officials were required to sign oaths of loyalty to Satsuma. Secondary sources, i.e. history books, often count this as the first tribute mission.

=== 1629 ===
No formal tribute/diplomatic mission was sent in this year, but three high-ranking officials from the Ryūkyū government journeyed to Edo to perform before shōgun Tokugawa Iemitsu.

=== 1649 ===
The 1649 mission was headed by Prince Gushikawa Chōei. Chōei was the seventh son of Shō Kyū, son of King Shō Gen (r. 1556–72).

=== 1682 ===
Prince Nago led a mission in 1682 to congratulate shōgun Tokugawa Tsunayoshi on his succession. He alone of the members of the mission was granted an audience with the shōgun; by contrast, the Korean representatives received several months later included three ambassadors and seven or so aides and pages. This is but one of many differences seen in the reception of Korean and Ryūkyūan embassies, reflections of the different levels of status the two countries held in the Japanese view.

The reception for Prince Nago was attended by all daimyōs below the fourth court rank; a great number of samurai lords, but of relatively low rank. In presenting formal greetings on behalf of King Shō Tei, he bowed nine times "on the fourth mat below the Lower State [and] withdrew" and then presented obeisances on his own behalf from the veranda. This, too, reflects a lower status than the Korean ambassadors, who made only four and a half bows from the second mat below the Middle Stage. Historian Ronald Toby, by way of contrasting the treatment of the two embassies, also adds that the Ryūkyūans were offered no grand banquet as the Koreans did, nor were they bade farewell by the rōjū (Council of Elders; chief shogunal advisors) when they left Edo for home, as the Korean envoys did.

=== 1710 ===
Mission to Edo included 168 from Ryūkyū, far exceeding the size of any previous mission. This is a reflection in large part of the relative prosperity of the kingdom under the guidance of royal advisor Sai On.

=== 1714 ===
The largest mission in the history of the practice journeys to Edo, led by Princes Yonagusuku and Kin. Tei Junsoku, Confucian scholar and influential educational reformer, accompanied the mission as the Chief of Correspondence. Tei met with Japanese Confucian scholars Arai Hakuseki, Ogyū Sorai, and Dazai Shundai. Hakuseki would later write a history of the Ryūkyū Islands, entitled "History of the Southern Islands" (南島史, Nantō-shi), based on discussions with Tei Junsoku and others during this envoy mission; Shundai likewise included passages about the Ryūkyūs in his "Economic Record" (経済録, Keizai roku).

Discussions between the Ryūkyūan emissaries and their Japanese counterparts concerned in part problems faced by the Ryūkyū Kingdom. Economic policies put into place in the ensuing years were patterned after recent Japanese policies under shōgun Tokugawa Tsunayoshi. The influence of this 1714 mission was particularly strong in drawing the attention of the shogunate to the affairs of the Ryūkyū Kingdom.

=== 1748–1752 ===
An embassy from the Ryūkyū Islands arrived in Japan in the 1st year of Kan'en (1648), and another embassy arrived in the 2nd year of Hōreki (1752).

=== 1764 ===
The king of the Ryūkyū Islands sent an ambassador to the court of Empress Go-Sakuramachi in the 1st year of Meiwa (1764); and presentations of Ryukyuan music were among the offerings presented by the Ryukyuan ambassador.

== Missions Table ==
Ryūkyūan Missions to Edo
Year	Mission type	Shōgun	Ryūkyūan King	Lead envoy	Number in entourage
1634	Congratulation & Gratitude	Tokugawa Iemitsu	Shō Hō	Princes Tamagusuku, Kin, Sashiki	Unknown
1644	Congratulation & Gratitude	Tokugawa Iemitsu	Shō Ken	Princes Kin, Kunigami	70
1649	Gratitude	Tokugawa Iemitsu	Shō Shitsu	Prince Gushikawa Chōei	63
1653	Congratulation	Tokugawa Ietsuna	Shō Shitsu	Prince Kunigami	71
1671	Gratitude	Tokugawa Ietsuna	Shō Tei	Prince Kin	74
1682	Congratulation	Tokugawa Tsunayoshi	Shō Tei	Prince Nago	94
1710	Congratulation & Gratitude	Tokugawa Ienobu	Shō Eki	Princes Miri, Tomigusuku	168
1714	Congratulation & Gratitude	Tokugawa Ietsugu	Shō Kei	Princes Kin, Yonagusuku	170
1718	Congratulation	Tokugawa Yoshimune	Shō Kei	Prince Goeku	94
1748	Congratulation	Tokugawa Ieshige	Shō Kei	Prince Gushikawa	98
1752	Gratitude	Tokugawa Ieshige	Shō Boku	Prince Nakijin	94
1764	Congratulation	Tokugawa Ieharu	Shō Boku	Prince Yomitanzan	96
1790	Congratulation	Tokugawa Ienari	Shō Boku	Prince Ginowan	96
1796	Gratitude	Tokugawa Ienari	Shō On	Prince Ōgimi	97
1806	Gratitude	Tokugawa Ienari	Shō Kō	Prince Yomitanzan	97
1832	Gratitude	Tokugawa Ienari	Shō Iku	Prince Tomigusuku	78
1842	Congratulation	Tokugawa Ieyoshi	Shō Iku	Prince Urasoe	99
1850	Gratitude	Tokugawa Ieyoshi	Shō Tai	Prince Tamakawa	99

== See also ==
- Japanese missions to Joseon
- Joseon missions to Japan
- Dutch missions to Edo
- Joseon tongsinsa
- Ryukyuan missions to Imperial China
- Ryukyuan missions to Joseon
- Hua-Yi distinction
- Tsūkō ichiran, mid-19th century text
- Sankin-kōtai
