= Taiki (Ryukyu) =

Taiki (泰期; Okinawan: Taichi, fl. 1372 – 1382) was a diplomat of the Chūzan Kingdom.

Taiki was a half-brother of Satto, and had the title Kaniman Aji (金満按司). According to Omoro Sōshi, he was a lord (Aji) of Oza (宇座), Yuntanza.

The first Chinese envoy visited Ryukyu in 1372. Taiki was dispatched to Ming China by Satto to pay tribute. From this time on, Ryukyu established trade contact and cultural exchange with China, and imported many cultural innovations from China. He went to China five times in ten years.

A statue was set up to his memory on the coast of Yomitan, Nakagami District, Okinawa. He was regarded as a god of commerce in Okinawa
