= Rin Seikō =

Rin Seikō (林 世功; 1842–1880) was a scholar-bureaucrat and diplomat of the Ryūkyū Kingdom. He was known for leading a movement to petition the government of Qing Dynasty China to rescue the Ryūkyū Kingdom from annexation by Imperial Japan.

It was standard at the time for members of Ryūkyū's aristocratic class to have two names: Chinese style name (唐名, Karana) and Japanese style name (大和名, Yamatona). "Rin Seikō" was his Chinese style name, while "Nashiro Shunbō" (名城 春傍) or "Nashiro Satonushioyakumoi Shunbō" (名城 里之子親雲上 春傍) was his Japanese style name.

== Life ==
Rin Seikō was born in Kumemura, a community descended from Chinese immigrants in the Ryūkyū Kingdom. He had studied in the Royal Academy of Ryūkyū Kingdom (国学, Kokugaku) in his early years. Having been chosen to start on the track to becoming a bureaucrat, he traveled to China to study at the age of 26, remaining at the Imperial Academy in Beijing for seven years. Upon returning to Okinawa, he was made instructor to the Crown Prince Shō Ten. Many people believed he would be elevated in position and power after King Shō Tai's death. But the government of Meiji Japan wanted to annex Okinawa, and unilaterally abolished the Ryūkyū Kingdom, and declared the islands to be the Ryūkyū Domain (琉球藩, Ryūkyū-han), with King Shō Tai as the head of the Han (藩王, Han'ō) in 1872.

Worrying about the future of the Ryūkyū Kingdom, Rin Seikō left for China with Kōchi Chōjō and Sai Taitei (蔡大鼎) for help. With the Ryūkyū-kan in Fuzhou as their base, Rin and Kōchi petitioned the government of Qing Dynasty China to rescue the Ryūkyū Kingdom from annexation by Imperial Japan, but there was little response.

Finally, Japan replaced the Ryūkyū Domain with Okinawa Prefecture on March 11, 1879. Rin Seikō went to Beijing to request that China send troops to the Ryūkyū Islands in the next year, but there was little response. Later, he heard that China had signed a peace treaty with Japan in Tianjin. Feeling hopeless, he killed himself by sword in Beijing.
