= Ōzato Chōryō =

Royal of the Ryukyu Kingdom

- 大里 朝亮

sessei of Ryukyu
- In office 1676–1686
- Preceded by: Haneji Chōshū
- Succeeded by: Kin Chōkō

Personal details
- Born: April 9, 1647
- Died: January 26, 1687 (aged 39)
- Parent(s): Shō Shitsu (father); Misato Aji-ganashi (mother)
- Chinese name: Shō Kōki (尚 弘毅)
- Rank: Wōji

Ōzato Wōji Chōryō (大里 王子 朝亮; 9 April 1647 – 26 January 1687), also known by his Chinese style name Shō Kōki (尚 弘毅), was a royal of Ryukyu Kingdom.

Prince Ōzato was the second son of King Shō Shitsu, and his mother was Misato Aji-ganashi (美里按司加那志). He was the first head of a royal family called Mabuni Udun (摩文仁御殿).

Prince Ōzato served as sessei from 1676 to 1686.

Ōzato Chōryō
title created	Head of Mabuni Udun	Succeeded by Mabuni Chōi
Political offices
Preceded by Shō Shōken (Haneji Chōshū)	Sessei of Ryukyu; 1676 - 1686	Succeeded by Kin Chōkō
