= Chatan Chōai =

- 北谷 朝愛

sessei of Ryukyu
- In office 1689–1705
- Preceded by: Kin Chōkō
- Succeeded by: Oroku Chōki

Personal details
- Born: June 11, 1650
- Died: December 11, 1719 (aged 69)
- Parent(s): Shō Shitsu (father); Mafee Aji (mother)
- Chinese name: Shō Kōsai (尚 弘才)
- Rank: Wōji

Chatan Wōji Chōai (北谷 王子 朝愛; 11 June 1650 – 11 December 1719), also known by his Chinese style name Shō Kōsai (尚 弘才), was a prince of Ryukyu Kingdom.

Chatan was the fourth son of King Shō Shitsu, and his mother was Mafee Aji (真南風按司). Chatan was the first head of a royal family called Ufumura Udun (大村御殿).

Chatan was given Chatan magiri (北谷間切, modern Chatan, Kadena and a part of Okinawa) as his hereditary fief. Later, he served as sessei from 1689 to 1705. He was allowed to sit in litter crossing Kōfuku Gate (広福門) and Ueki Gate (右掖門) in Shuri Castle.

Chatan Chōai died without heir in 1719. Chatan Chōki, who was the second son of King Shō Eki, became his adopted son and inherited his title.

The name "Prince Chatan" appeared in an Okinawan folktale: Mimi kiri bōzu (耳切り坊主, "a monk whose ears was cut off"). In this folktale, Prince Chatan was good at playing go, he killed Kurogane zasu (黒金座主), a Vajrayana Buddhist monk, and was cursed, all his sons died young. The prototype of "Prince Chatan" is unclear. Some scholars considered him to be Chatan Chōai, others consider Chatan Chōki, the adopted son of Chōai, to be the basis for the story.

Chatan Chōai
title created	Head of Ufumura Udun	Succeeded by Chatan Chōki
Political offices
Preceded by Kin Chōkō	Sessei of Ryukyu; 1689 - 1705	Succeeded by Oroku Chōki
