= Tsūkō ichiran =

Mid-19th century Japanese compilation of documents

Tsūkō ichiran (通航一覧) is a mid-19th century Japanese compilation of documents or "survey of intercourse" related to the foreign relations of the Tokugawas and the Tokugawa shogunate.

These documents, descriptions and commentary encompass Japanese bilateral and international relations; and the work has been parsed into sections by country across 350 volumes. The text is organized chronologically within each sections.

This historical survey was compiled in 1853 by the shogunate's chief foreign relations advisor, Daigaku-no-kami Hayashi Akira (also known as Hayashi Fukusai). With the help of others, Akira was able to prepare volume which includes material from 1566 through 1825.

- 1853 (Kaei 6): Akira completed Tsūkō ichiran. The work was created under orders from the bakufu to compile and edit documents pertaining to East Asian trade and diplomacy; and, for example, it includes a detailed description of a Ryukyuan tribute embassy to the Qing Chinese court in Beijing.

The purpose of this project was to develop a policy guide based on two and a half centuries of diplomatic precedents. For example, Daiyūin tono ojikki (Chronicle of Shogun Iemitsu) by Narushima Motonao (1778-1862) is cited; and one referenced excerpt presents an arguably convincing analysis:

- 1846 (Shōhō 3, 10th month): " ... sending a [military] expedition from Japan [to China] would not be successful and not only would be humiliating for the Japanese but would insure a long-term enemy of a foreign land, and it would cause eternal harm. Even if Japanese troops were to win victories and gain terrain, it would be like rocky soil, of no advantage to the country, in fact inviting disasters in years to come."—attributed to Tokugawa Yoshinobu.

The text was reprinted in moveable type and published in eight volumes in 1912–1913. The twenty-three volume appendix on coastal defenses, Tsūkō ichiran zokushū, was published at the same time.

== See also ==
- Joseon Tongsinsa
- Imperial Japanese embassies to China
- Ryukyuan missions to Edo
