= Shō Kyū =

Shō Kyū (尚 久; 15 November 1560 – 17 April 1620), also known by Prince Kin Chōkō (金武 朝公), was a royal of the Ryukyu Kingdom. He was father of King Shō Hō.

Shō Kyū was the third son of King Shō Gen, and was the originator of a royal family, Kin Udun (金武御殿). He had three famous sons: the eldest son King Shō Hō; the fourth son Kin Chōtei; and the seventh son Gushikawa Chōei.

Shō Kyū was posthumously honored as king in 1699, and his spirit tablet was placed in Sōgen-ji. His title was stripped in 1719, and his spirit tablet was moved to Tennō-ji.

Shō Kyū
title created	Head of Kin Udun	Succeeded by Kin Chōtei
