= Lin Hongnian =

Chinese politician, writer and calligrapher (1805–1885)

- 林鴻年
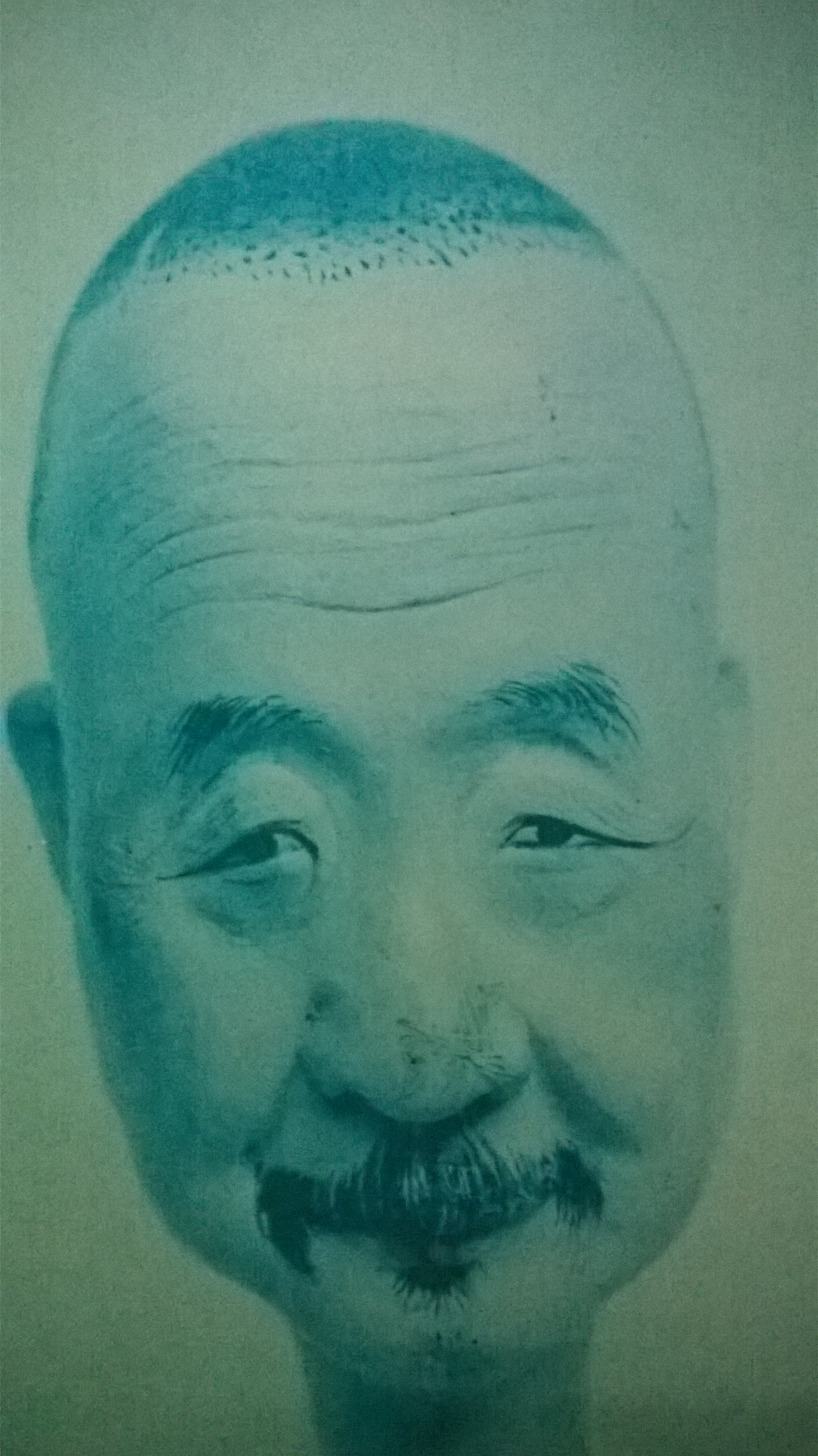

Governor of Yunnan
- In office 24 September 1864 – 9 March 1866
- Preceded by: Jia Hongzhao
- Succeeded by: Liu Yuezhao

Personal details
- Born: 1805; Houguan county, Fuzhou, Fujian (present-day Gulou District, Fuzhou), Qing China
- Died: 1885 (aged 79–80); Fuzhou, Fujian, Qing China
- Education: jinshi degree

Chinese name
- Traditional Chinese: 林鴻年
- Simplified Chinese: 林鸿年
Transcriptions
Standard Mandarin
- Hanyu Pinyin: Lín Hóngnián

Courtesy name
- Chinese: 勿村
Transcriptions
Standard Mandarin
- Hanyu Pinyin: Wùchūn

Lin Hongnian (Chinese: 林鴻年, 1805–1885) was a politician, writer and calligrapher of the Qing dynasty.

Lin was born in Houguan county, Fuzhou. In 1836, he achieved the highest score in the Imperial examination and was appointed as the senior compiler in the Hanlin Academy (翰林院修撰). He was the first zhuangyuan from Fujian during the Qing dynasty. Two years later, the Chinese Qing court sent him as the chief envoy to Ryukyu Kingdom for the investiture of Shō Iku, while Gao Renjian (高人鑑) was the deputy envoy. The mission had stayed in Ryukyu for 160 days, and Lin wrote down an official account of the Ryukyu islands entitled Shi Liuqiu-lu (使琉球錄), however this book was lost. He also compiled a document titled Nautical Route from Fujian to Ryukyus (福建往琉球針路) together with Gao Renjian.

Later, Lin had served as the magistrate of Qiongzhou (瓊州知府, 1846–1849), Governor of Lei Qiong Circuit (雷瓊道道員, 1849–1859), magistrate of Lin'an (臨安知府, 1859–1863), the Judicial Commissioner of Yunnan (雲南按察使, 1863), and the Administrative Commissioner of Yunnan (雲南布政使, 1863–1864). Lin was appointed as the Governor of Yunnan (雲南巡撫) in 1864. He took part in the suppression of the Taiping Rebellion. In 1866, he was accused of "overstay due to being in dread of the rebels (畏寇逗留)" and was stripped of official position. Although rehabilitated in the same year, he was tired of power struggle and decided to retire. Invited by Zuo Zongtang, Lin returned to his hometown, Fuzhou, and became the master of the Zhengyi Shuyuan academy (正誼書院), which was the precursor of the Fuzhou No.1 Middle School. He raised a large number of students from 1866 to 1885, including Chen Baochen, Lin Shu, Chen Yan, and Wu Zengqi.
