= Oroku Chōki =

Sessei of Ryukyu

- 小禄 朝奇

sessei of Ryukyu
- In office 1705–1712
- Preceded by: Chatan Chōai
- Succeeded by: Tomigusuku Chōkyō

Personal details
- Born: November 9, 1676
- Died: May 3, 1721 (aged 44)
- Parent(s): Shō Tei (father); Makabe Aji-ganashi (mother)
- Chinese name: Shō Kō (尚 綱)
- Rank: Wōji

Oroku Wōji Chōki (小禄 王子 朝奇; 9 November 1676 – 3 May 1721), also known by his Chinese style name Shō Mō (尚 網) or Shō Kō (尚 綱), was a prince of Ryukyu Kingdom.

Chōki was the third son of King Shō Tei. His mother was Makabe Aji-ganashi (真壁按司加那志), the successor consort of King Shō Tei, so he was also a full-brother of Prince Misato Chōtei (美里 朝禎). Chōki was the originator of royal family Gushichan Udun (具志頭御殿). He served as sessei from 1705 to 1712.

Chōki's second son, Misato Chōkō (美里 朝孝), was adopted by Misato Chōtei, and later became the second head of royal family Ōgimi Udun (大宜見御殿). Chōki's third son, Makabe Chōei (真壁 朝盈), was adopted by grandmother Makabe Aji-ganashi, and was the originator of royal family Makabe Udun (真壁御殿).

Oroku Chōki
title created	Head of Gushichan Udun	Succeeded by Oroku Chōrō
Political offices
Preceded by Chatan Chōai	Sessei of Ryukyu; 1705 - 1712	Succeeded by Tomigusuku Chōkyō
