= Shō Ken =

Shō Ken 尚賢 shoo chin
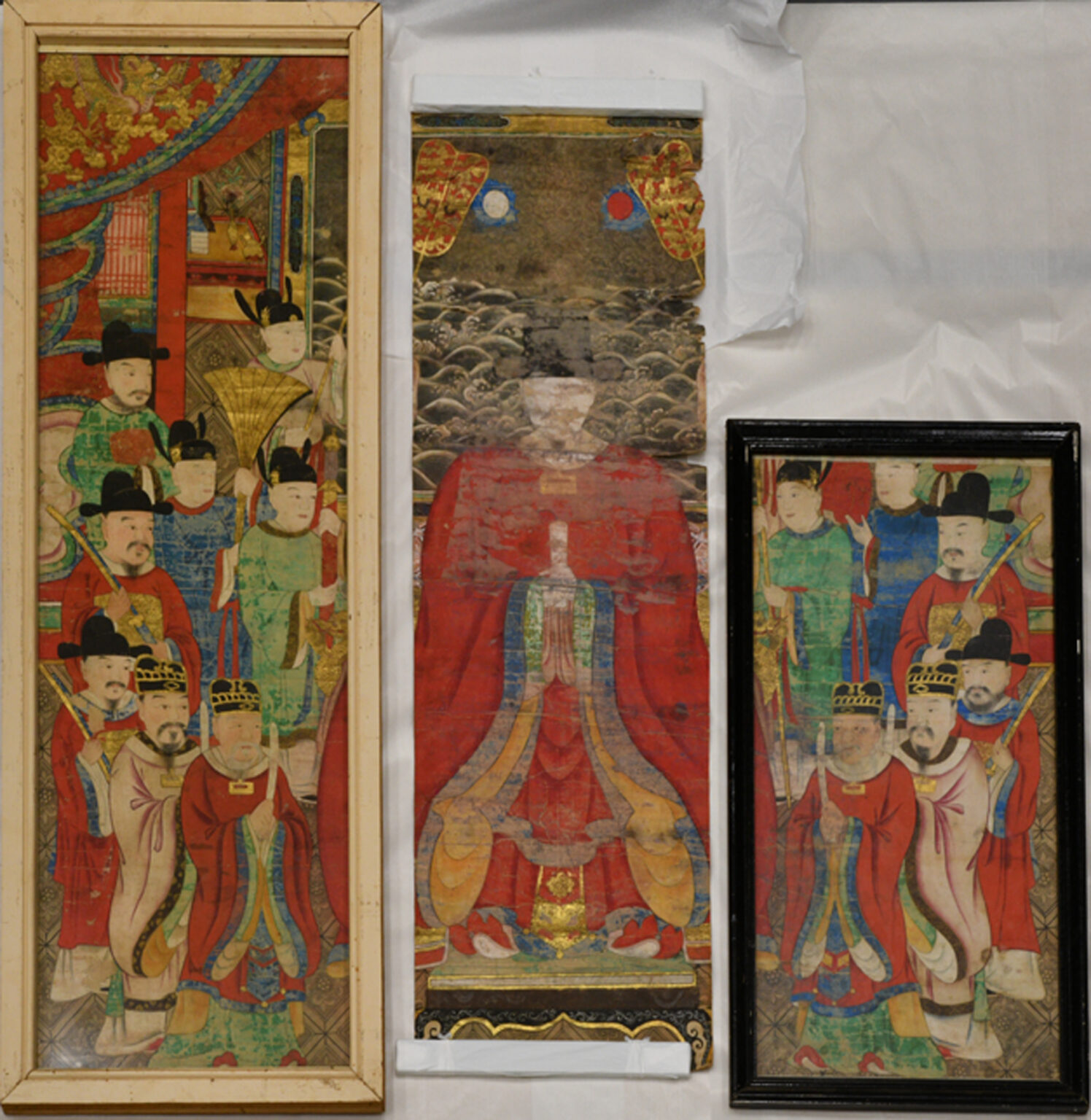
- a damaged Ugui portrait supposed to be of King Shō Ken or King Shō Shitsu

King of Ryūkyū
- Reign: 1641–1647
- Predecessor: Shō Hō
- Successor: Shō Shitsu
- Born: Umimachigani (思松金); October 15, 1625
- Died: October 19, 1647 (aged 22)
- Burial: Tamaudun, Shuri
Names
- Shō Ken (尚賢)
- House: Second Shō dynasty
- Father: Shō Hō
- Mother: Iri no Aji-ganashi

Shō Ken (尚 賢, Shō Ken; October 15, 1625 – October 19, 1647) was the 9th king of the Ryukyu Kingdom, who ruled from 1641 to 1647.

== Life ==
Shō Ken was the third son of Shō Hō. He had two elder brothers named Shō Kyō (尚恭) and Shō Bun (尚文), but both of them died before their father. So Shō Ken became the heir apparent of the kingdom, and was given Kume and Nakagusuku magiri as his domain. After Shō Hō's death, Shō Ken was installed as the king.

Many of the Sakishima Beacons were built during his reign.

Regnal titles
Preceded by Shō Hō	King of Ryūkyū; 1641–1647	Succeeded by Shō Shitsu
