= Tsuhako Seisei =

Ryukyuan politician

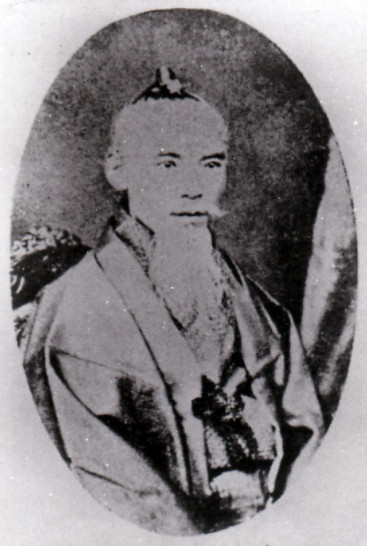
Tsuhako Seisei

Tsuhako Ueekata Seisei (津波古 親方 政正; 1816 – 1877), also known by the Chinese-style name Tō Kokukō (東 国興), was a politician and bureaucrat of Ryukyu Kingdom.

Tsuhako was born in Shuri. In 1840, he traveled to Qing China to study, and remained at the Imperial Academy in Beijing for eight years. Upon returning to Ryukyu, he received the title Kokushi (国師) which was the instructor of King Shō Tai.

In 1874, Tsuhako was sent by the king on an embassy to Japan. He was shocked at the great change during Meiji Restoration. After he came back to Ryukyu, he suggested that Ryukyu should be annexed by Japan because it was beneficial. His proposition was under serious attack. The former Sanshikan Kamegawa Seibu regarded him as a traitor.
