= Shō Jun (1660–1707) =

- 尚純
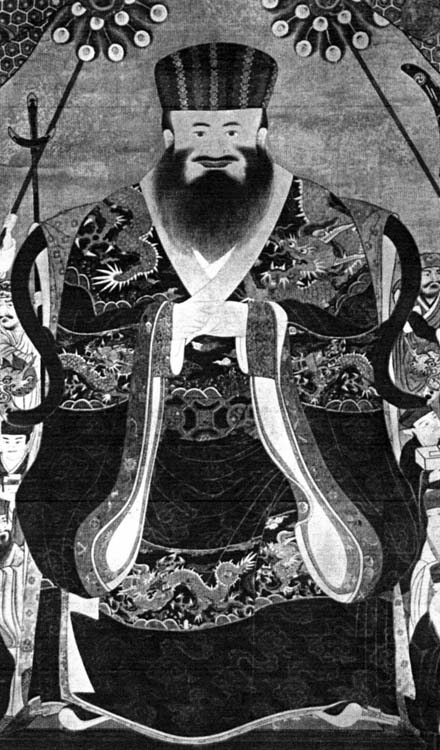
- Official royal portrait of Shō Jun, painted by Mō Chōki in 1856.

Crown Prince of Ryukyu
- In office 1669–1706
- Monarch: Shō Tei

Personal details
- Born: Umitukugani (思徳金); 15 February 1660 Shuri, Ryukyu Kingdom
- Died: 2 February 1707 (aged 46) Shuri, Ryukyu Kingdom
- Resting place: Tamaudun
- Spouse(s): Giun, Kikoe-ōkimi-ganashi
- Children: Shō Eki; Umimazurugani, Princess Kokuba; Shō Kan, Prince Noguni Chōchoku; Shō Sei, Prince Goeku Chōtoku
- Parents: Shō Tei (father); Gesshin, Kikoe-ōkimi-ganashi (mother)

Shō Jun (尚純; 1660–1707) was a Crown Prince of the Ryūkyū Kingdom, the son of King Shō Tei.

At the age of 9, he was named Prince of Nakagusuku, and given Sashiki and Nakagusuku magiri as his domains. His domain was changed to that of Kume Gushikawa magiri in 1676, and to Sashiki and Nakazato magiri in 1689.

He died in 1707 before being able to succeed to the throne of the kingdom, and was entombed in the royal mausoleum of Tamaudun.
