= Tei Fuku =

Tei Fuku (程 復; 1330 – ?), also known by Cheng Fu, was a Chinese politician and diplomat of the Ryukyu Kingdom.

Tei Fuku was born in Raozhou, Jiangxi, Ming China. He was a descendant of the neo-Confucian philosopher Cheng Hao. It is still a mystery when and why he came to Ryukyu. During Satto's reign, Tei Fuku and another Chinese immigrant Yō Kiin (葉 希尹), were Aji and served as Tsūji (通事, "interpreters") when the Ryukyuans received Chinese envoys to collect tribute.

Tei Fuku served as Kokushō (国相, "Chief Minister") in Ryukyu for 40 years. In 1411, he was 81 years old, and asked for retirement and said that he wanted to go back home. His request was approved by the Yongle Emperor. After he returned to China, his position was turned to his colleague Ō Mō.

Political offices
Preceded by Aranpō?	Sessei of Ryukyu ? - 1411	Succeeded by Ō Mō
