= Kōchi Chōjō =

Ryukyuan aristocrat (1843–1891)

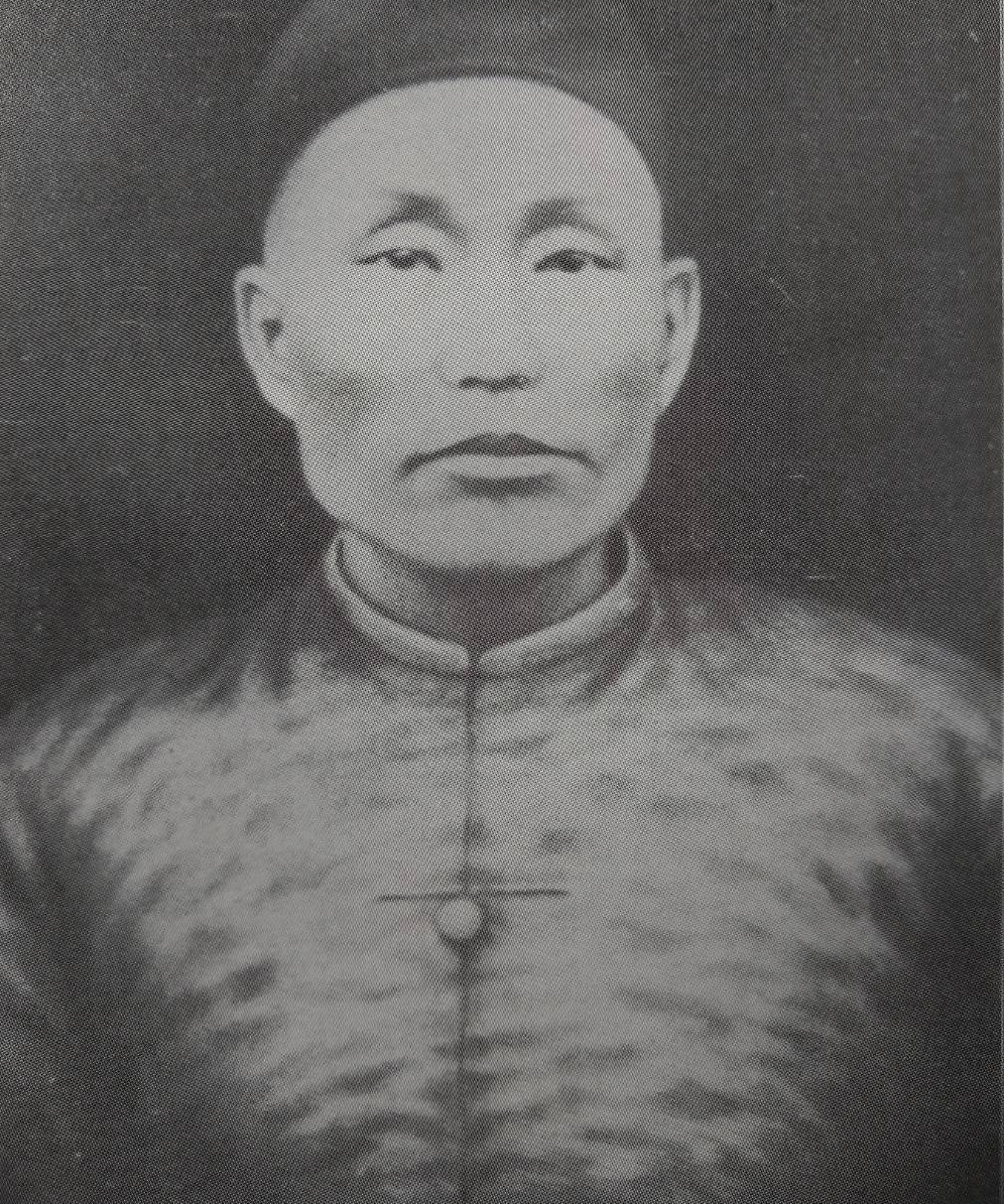
Kōchi Chōjō wearing Manchu dress

Kōchi ueekata Chōjō (幸地 親方 朝常; 1843–1891) was a Ryukyuan aristocrat known for leading a movement to petition the government of Qing Dynasty China to rescue the Ryūkyū Kingdom from annexation by Imperial Japan, following the 1872 announcement by the government of Meiji Japan to do so.

It was typical at this time for Ryukyuan aristocrats to have multiple names. Chōjō held the title of ueekata of the domain of Kōchi, and was thus known as "Kōchi ueekata". He was also known as Shō Tokukō (向 徳宏; C: Xiang Dehong).

== Life ==
Details of his early life are unknown. In 1876, however, Chōjō left for China from Unten Harbor on the Motobu Peninsula, in the north of Okinawa Island, claiming he was simply crossing over to nearby Iejima. Arriving in China, he adopted Chinese (Manchu) hairstyle and dress and, with the Ryūkyū-kan in Fuzhou as his base, he began traveling to various parts, seeking support for his cause: to convince the Qing government to aid Ryūkyū in remaining independent from Japan.

Chōjō gathered other Ryukyuans who, like himself, had fled for China, including Rin Seikō (林世功) and Sai Taitei (蔡大鼎). Together, they submitted numerous petitions to the Qing officials asking for help on behalf of the kingdom. Though there was little, if any, positive response for a long time, Chōjō and others refused to give up.

He died in Fukien Province.
