= Shō Kyō =

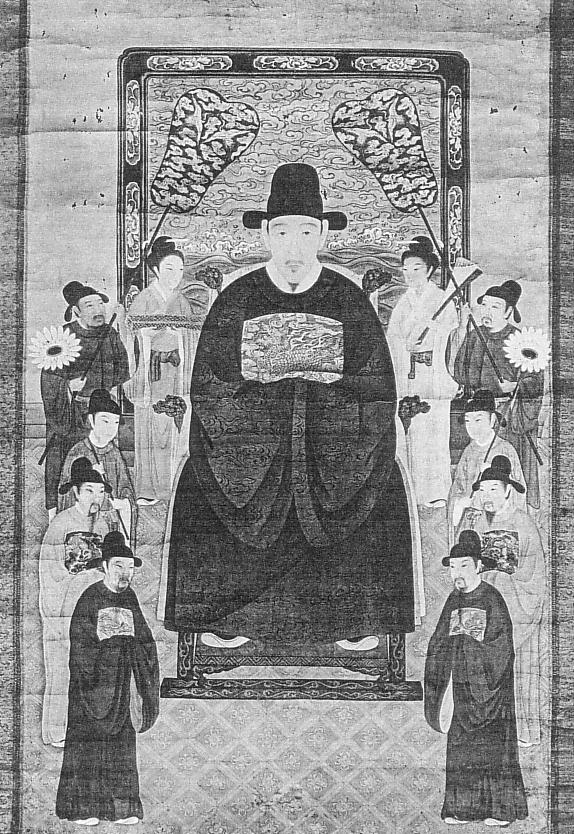
Shō Kyō

Shō Kyō (尚 恭; 8 March 1612 – 22 March 1631), also known by Prince Urasoe Chōryō (浦添 朝良), was a prince of the Ryukyu Kingdom. He was the eldest son of King Shō Hō.

King Shō Nei had no heir. Shō Kyō was chosen as Crown Prince by the kingdom’s ministers, and was recognized by Satsuma as the rightful heir. However, Shō Nei died in 1620 and Shō Kyō was too young to succeed the throne. Yuntanza Seishō, who was a member of the sanshikan, suggested that Shō Kyō's father, Shō Hō (Prince Sashiki Chōshō), should be the new king. Many ministers supported it, but were concerned about the reaction of Satsuma. Yuntanza went to Satsuma to report this decision. Finally, Satsuma recognized Shō Hō as the new king.

Shō Kyō remained in his position of Crown Prince, but died in 1631 before being able to succeed to the throne. His daughter, Princess Urasoe (浦添翁主), was the originator of a royal family, Takanmi Udun (高嶺御殿).

His spirit tablet was placed in Tenkai-ji.
