= Qolqoleh-ye Chatan =

Village in Kurdistan, Iran

Qolqoleh قلقله
- Village
- Location within Iran
- Coordinates: 35°29′04″N 46°49′58″E
- Country: Iran
- Province: Kurdistan
- County: Sanandaj
- Bakhsh: Central
- Rural District: Sarab Qamish

Population (2006)
  - Total: 106
- Time zone: UTC+3:30 (IRST)
  - Summer (DST): UTC+4:30 (IRDT)

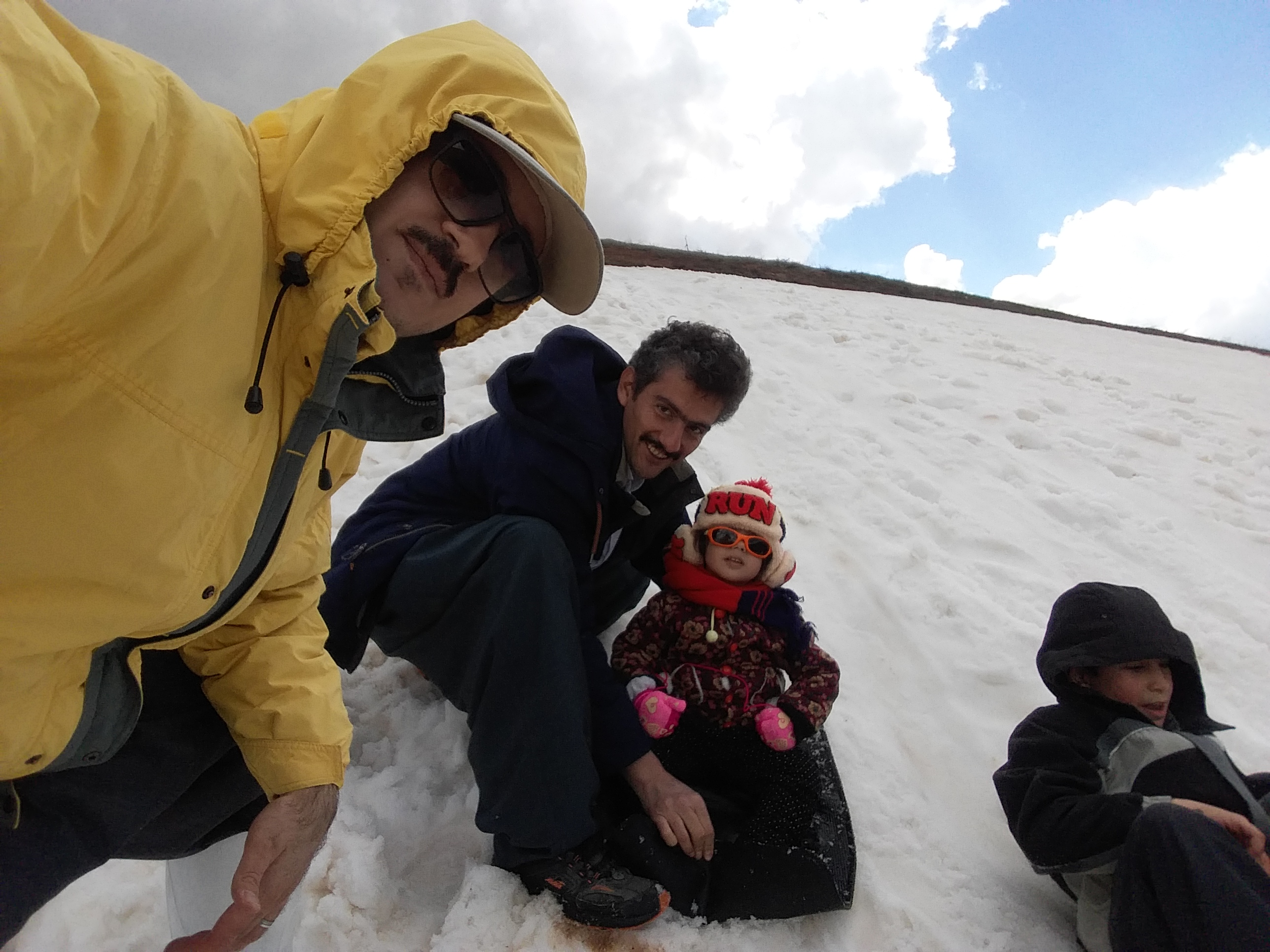

Qolqoleh (Persian: قلقله, also Romanized as Qolqoleh; also known as Qolqoleh, Qolqoleh, Qūl Qīyeh, and Qulqulleh) is a village in Sarab Qamish Rural District, in the Central District of Sanandaj County, Kurdistan Province, Iran. At the 2006 census, its population was 106, in 27 families. The village is populated by Kurds.
