= Shō Sei (r. 1803) =

King of Ryūkyū

Shō Sei 尚成 shoo shii

King of Ryūkyū
- Reign: 1802–1803
- Predecessor: Shō On
- Successor: Shō Kō
- Born: Umitukugani (思徳金); 4 December 1800
- Died: 7 February 1803 (aged 2)
Names
- Shō Sei (尚成)
- House: Second Shō dynasty
- Father: Shō On
- Mother: Kikoe-ōgimi Ganashi

Shō Sei (尚 成; 4 December 1800 – 7 February 1803) was king of the Ryūkyū Kingdom from 1802 to 1803.

== Life ==
Shō Sei was the only son of king Shō On. He was 2 years old when he succeeded his father on August 8 (Lunar calendar: the eleventh day of the seventh month), 1802, and died of smallpox one year later. After his death, his uncle Shō Kō was installed as the next king.

Regnal titles
Preceded by Shō On	King of Ryūkyū; 1802–1803	Succeeded by Shō Kō
