= Joseon missions to the Ryukyu Kingdom =

Joseon missions to the Ryukyu Kingdom were diplomatic and trade ventures of the Joseon dynasty that were intermittently sent after 1392. These diplomatic contacts were within the Sinocentric system of bilateral and multinational relationships in East Asia. The Ryukyuan King Satto established formal relations with the Joseon court.

In 1392, the envoy from the Ryukyu Kingdom to the court of the Goryeo monarch became among the first foreign representatives to appear in the court of the new king of what would be called the Joseon dynasty. In this period, the historic, political, and diplomatic material for research on relations with Ryukyu are encompassed within the Annals of the Joseon Dynasty (Joseon Wangjo Sillok). The first Joseon diplomatic embassy at the Ryukyuan court in 1392 was followed by a second one in 1393.

These reciprocal diplomatic and trade relations continue uninterrupted until the war years of 1592–1598; and they were restored after the end of the Imjin War.

== See also ==
- Ryukyuan missions to Edo
- Joseon missions to Imperial China
- Joseon missions to Japan
- List of monarchs of the Ryukyu Islands
- Imperial Chinese missions to the Ryukyu Kingdom
