= Ie Chōchoku =

Former prince of the Ryukyu Islands

- 伊江 朝直
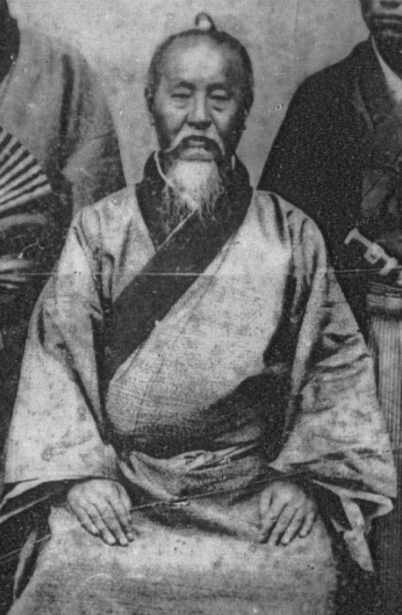

sessei of Ryukyu
- In office 1872–1875
- Monarch: Shō Tai
- Preceded by: Yonagusuku Chōki
- Succeeded by: title abolished

Personal details
- Born: September 23, 1818 Shuri, Ryukyu Kingdom
- Died: January 4, 1896 (aged 77) Tokyo, Empire of Japan
- Children: Ie Chōei (son)
- Parent(s): Shō Kō (father); Onaha Agunshitari (mother); Ie Chōhei (adoptive father)
- Chinese name: Shō Ken (尚 健)
- Rank: Wōji

Ie Wōji Chōchoku (伊江 王子 朝直; 23 September 1818 – 4 January 1896), also known by the Chinese-style name Shō Ken (尚 健), was a prince of Ryukyu Kingdom. Sometimes he was called Prince Ie (伊江王子) for short.

Prince Ie was the fifth son of King Shō Kō. He served as sessei from 1872 to 1875. After Ryukyu was annexed by Japan in 1879, Prince Ie was incorporated into the newly established kazoku peerage. In 1890, his eldest son Ie Chōei (伊江朝永) was granted the title of baron (男爵, danshaku).

Ie Chōchoku
Preceded by Ie Chōhei	head of Ie Udun	Succeeded by Ie Chōei
Political offices
Preceded by Yonagusuku Chōki	Sessei of Ryukyu; 1872 - 1875	title abolished
