= Shō On =

Shō On 尚温 shoo un

King of Ryūkyū
- Reign: 1795–1802
- Predecessor: Shō Boku
- Successor: Shō Sei
- Born: Umigurugani (思五郎金); March 21, 1784
- Died: August 8, 1802 (aged 18)
- Burial: Tamaudun, Shuri
- Spouse: Sentoku (Sashiki Aji)
- Issue: Shō Sei, Crown Prince Nakagusuku
Names
- Shō On (尚温)
- Yamato name: Chōkoku (朝克)
- House: Second Shō dynasty
- Father: Shō Tetsu
- Mother: Tokutaku, Kikoe-ōkimi-ganashi

Shō On (尚 温; March 21, 1784 – August 8, 1802) was king of the Ryukyu Kingdom from 1795 to 1802. He made a great contribution to the education of Ryukyu during his reign.

== Life ==
Shō On was the eldest grandson of the former king, Shō Boku. His father Shō Tetsu died when Shō Boku was still alive, so he became the Heir apparent of the kingdom. After Shō Boku's death, Shō On was installed as the king. However, Shō On was only 11 years old, his teacher Sai Seishō (蔡世昌) became the Kokushi (国師), serving as the king's regent.

The Kokugaku (国学) was established as the National Academy of the Ryukyu Kingdom in Shuri Castle on 1798. Four schools were also founded in the countryside, even farmers could receive education.

But the idea of equal education was not accepted by the Kumemura people, so they launched a rebellion against the reform, and Sai Seishō died in the incident. The rebellion was quickly put down, and some education privileges of Kumemura people were abolished.

Shō On died when he was only 18 years old. His successor was his only child, the infant Shō Sei, who died 1 year later. Shō On's younger brother Shō Kō succeeded.

Regnal titles
Preceded by Shō Boku	King of Ryūkyū; 1795–1802	Succeeded by Shō Sei
