= Shō Hō =

Shō Hō 尚豊
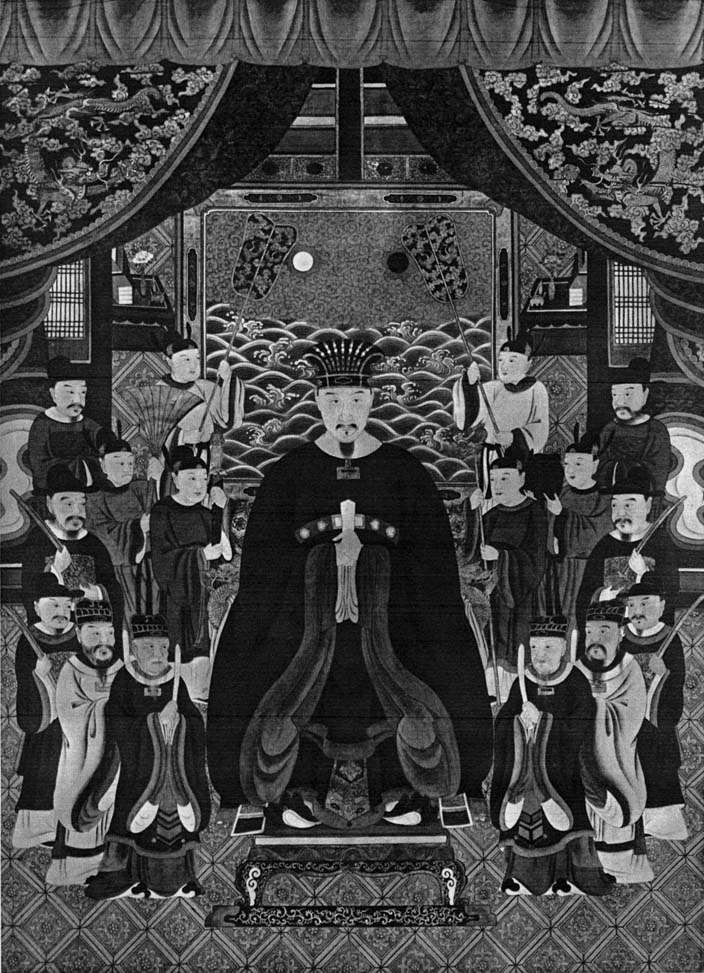
- Official royal portrait of Shō Hō, painted by Shō Genko in 1796.

King of Ryūkyū
- Reign: 1621–1640
- Predecessor: Shō Nei
- Successor: Shō Ken

sessei of Ryukyu
- Tenure: 1617–1621
- Predecessor: Kikuin Sōi
- Successor: Kin Chōtei
- Born: Umigurugani (思五郎金); December 9, 1590
- Died: June 23, 1640 (aged 49)
- Burial: Tamaudun, Shuri, Okinawa
- Spouse: Gaja-Uemori Aji-ganashi; Kimitoyomi Aji-ganashi
- Concubine: Nishi no Aji-ganashi, Ryōgetsu; Mafē Aji, Ranshitsu; Mafē Aji, Nangaku; Yonabaru Agomo-shirare
- Issue: Shō Kyō, Prince Urasoe Chōryō; Shō Bun, Crown Prince Nakagusuku Chōeki; Shō Ken, Prince Kume-Nakagusuku; Shō Shitsu, Prince Sashiki; Princess Shuri-ōkimi Aji-ganashi; Princess Takushi; Princess Shimajiri-Sashisaka Aji-ganashi; Princess Yonashiro
Names
- Shō Hō (尚豊)
- Divine name: Tenigiyasuhe-ajisohe (天喜也末按司添 tinnijiyashii ajishii)
- Yamato name: Chōshō (朝昌)
- House: Second Shō dynasty
- Father: Shō Kyū, Prince Kin Chōkō
- Mother: Kin Ō-Aji-ganashi
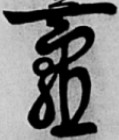
- Signature

Shō Hō (尚豊; 9 December 1590 – 23 June 1640) was a king of the Ryukyu Kingdom. He succeeded Shō Nei, whose reign saw the invasion of Ryukyu by Japanese forces in 1609 and the subjugation of the kingdom to Satsuma Domain, and ruled from 1621 until 1640.

== Life ==
Shō Hō was the fourth son of Shō Kyū, the third son of King Shō Gen. In 1616, he was appointed kokushō, a high government position akin to prime minister or chief royal advisor, which would later be replaced with sessei.

Three years later, Shō Hō was named Prince of Nakagusuku and given Nakagusuku magiri as his domain. King Shō Nei died without an heir in 1621, and Shō Hō was selected to succeed him. As the first king to be enthroned since Satsuma's invasion in 1609, formal permission and acknowledgment of the king's authority and legitimacy was required before performing the coronation ceremony, sending heralds to China, and assuming the responsibilities of the throne. In addition, while Shō Hō retained powers related to organization of offices and administration of punishments, along with all the ritual prestige of the throne, Shō Nei was the last king of Ryukyu to rule personally, directly, and absolutely as monarch. Much of the decisions and behavior of Shō Hō's government were subject to Satsuma's approval.

Relations with China were also strained. At the start of Shō Hō's reign, Okinawan tribute ships were only welcome in Fuzhou once every ten years. The Chinese Imperial Court had reduced the tribute missions to this frequency following the Japanese invasion in 1609, claiming that it was done in consideration of the instability and poverty that the chaos of the invasion must have brought to the kingdom. In fact, these tribute missions, the only legal method of trading with Ming China, were essential to the kingdom's economic prosperity. Therefore, in 1623, when investiture missions were exchanged, the Ryukyuan officials pushed for a return to the system of sending tribute every other year; it was decided that missions would be allowed once every five years.

After a twenty-year reign, Shō Hō died in 1640, and was succeeded by his son, Shō Ken.

== See also ==
- Imperial Chinese missions to the Ryukyu Kingdom

== Notes ==
Regnal titles
Preceded by Shō Nei	King of Ryūkyū; 1621–1640	Succeeded by Shō Ken
Political offices
Preceded by Kikuin Sōi	Sessei of Ryukyu; 1617 - 1621	Succeeded by Kin Chōtei
