= Shō Tetsu =

Crown Prince of the Ryūkyū Kingdom

- 尚哲

Crown Prince of Ryukyu
- In office 1768–1788
- Monarch: Shō Boku

Personal details
- Born: Umitukugani (思徳金); 31 May 1759 Shuri, Ryukyu Kingdom
- Died: 19 September 1788 (aged 29) Shuri, Ryukyu Kingdom
- Resting place: Tamaudun
- Spouse(s): Tokutaku, Kikoe-ōkimi-ganashi
- Children: Shō Hō, Prince Umigurugani; Umimazurugani, Princess Onaga; King Shō On; Shō Kō, Prince Makamadugani; Makamitaru, Princess Nakaima; King Shō Kō
- Parent: Shō Boku (father)

Shō Tetsu (尚 哲; 31 May 1759 – 19 September 1788) was a Crown Prince of the Ryūkyū Kingdom, the eldest son of King Shō Boku.

In 1756, Crown Prince Shō Tetsu toured Southern Kyushu.

He died in 1788 before being able to succeed to the throne of the kingdom, and was entombed in the royal mausoleum of Tamaudun. King Shō On and King Shō Kō both are his sons.
