= Ryūkyū-kan =

Institutions serving as homes and bases of operations for Ryukyuan missions

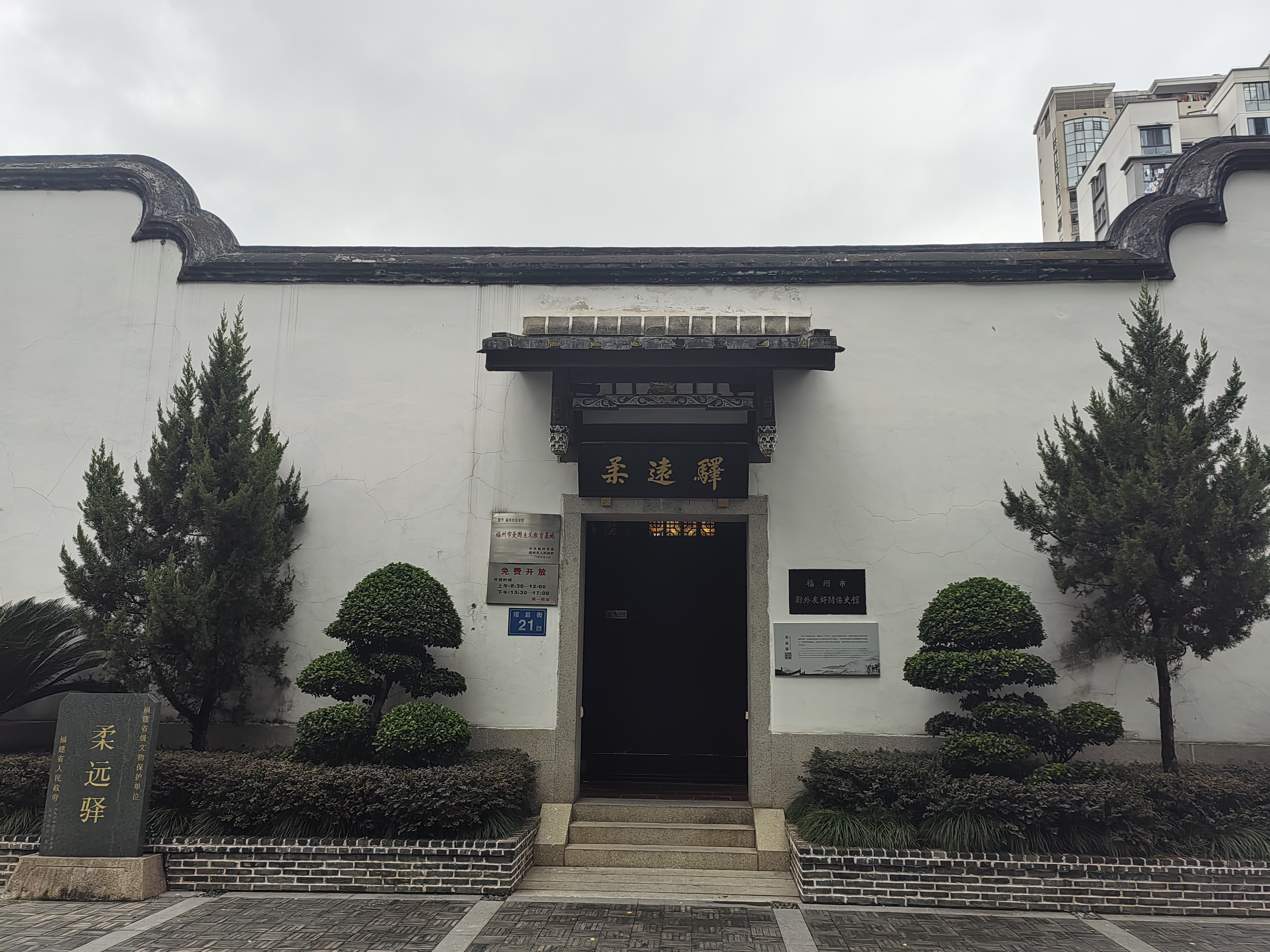
Ryūkyū-kan in Fuzhou, China

Ryūkyū-kan (琉球館, Okinawan:Rūchū-kwan) were institutions serving as homes and bases of operations for Ryukyuan missions in early modern Fuzhou (Fujian province, China) and Kagoshima (Satsuma Domain, Japan).

== Fuzhou ==
The Chinese Ryūkyū-kan (Liúqiú guǎn in Mandarin Chinese pinyin) is located in the city of Fuzhou. Along with the nearby Kaido-kan (開戸館) and Kokushi-kan (国使館), it housed visiting dignitaries and scholars en route between Ryukyu and the Chinese capital of Nanjing or Beijing. In addition to officials sent by the kingdom to engage in formal diplomatic matters, Ryukyu regularly sent a small number of students to study a variety of traditional Chinese subjects in the capital, primarily in preparation for careers in the kingdom's government and bureaucracy.

== Kagoshima ==
The Ryūkyū-kan in Kagoshima was located below the castle, on the site occupied today by Nagata Middle School and governmental food provisions offices.

It played a central role in relations between the Ryukyu Kingdom and the han (feudal domain) to which it was a vassal after 1609, serving a function not unlike a modern-day embassy. Visiting dignitaries lived and worked in the Ryūkyū-kan, as did students studying classic subjects in preparation for careers in the kingdom's bureaucracy, and a number of Ryukyuan permanent residents of the city. Satsuma's control over the Ryukyuan officials was tight, however; wandering or loitering in the area around the building was forbidden, and guards posted at the entrance checked visitors in and out. Ryukyuans could travel around the city, and to other parts of the country, only on official business, and under tight supervision and strict regulations. Similarly strict policies applied to Japanese visiting the institution.

The building was destroyed by British naval gunfire during the Bombardment of Kagoshima in 1863.

== See also ==
- Waegwan, Japanese diplomatic institution in Busan, Korea.
