= Ryukyuan missions to Joseon =

Ryukyuan missions to Joseon were diplomatic and trade ventures of the Ryūkyū Kingdom which were intermittently sent in the years 1392–1879. These diplomatic contacts were within the Sinocentric system of bilateral and multinational relationships in East Asia. The Ryukyuan King Satto established formal relations with the Joseon court.

These diplomatic contacts represented a significant aspect of the international relations of mutual Ryukyuan-Joseon contacts and communication. Ryukyuan missions are recorded in late-Goryeo diplomatic history; and these diplomatic and trade relations continue uninterrupted until the war years of 1592–1598.

== Responding to dynastic change ==
Yi Seong-gye declared a new dynasty in 1392–1393 under the name of Joseon (meaning to revive an older dynasty also known as Joseon, founded nearly four thousand years previously). The country was to be called the "Kingdom of Great Joseon". Shortly after his ascension, the new monarch sent envoys to inform the Ming court at Nanking that a dynastic change had taken place.

In 1392, the envoy from the Ryūkyū Kingdom to the court of the Goryeo monarch became among the first foreign representatives to appear in the court of the new king of what would be called the Joseon Dynasty. In this period, the historic, political, and diplomatic material for research on relations with the Ryukyus are encompassed within the Annals of Joseon Dynasty (Joseon Wangjo Sillok).

== Missions to Joseon ==
Envoys form the Ryūkyū Kingdom were received in 1392. Ryūkyū also sent missions in 1394 and 1397. Between 1409 and 1477, the Joseon court received 13 diplomatic and trade missions from the Ryūkyū Islands.

- 1392 – An envoy and his retinue from the Kingdom of Ryūkyū are recorded as having been received at the Joseon court. The Joseon Wangjo Sillok records that the envoys from Ryūkyū were accorded "East fifth rank lower grade" Their retainers were accorded "sixth rank lower grade." The Ryūkyū delegation offered what are identified as pangmul, which is the term for gifts offered by subordinate states.
- 1394 – An envoy and his retinue from the Kingdom of Ryūkyū were received.
- 1397 – An envoy and his retinue from the Kingdom of Ryūkyū were received.

== See also ==
- Joseon missions to the Ryukyu Kingdom
