= Makishi Chōchū =

Ryukyuan diplomat (1818–1862)

- 牧志朝忠
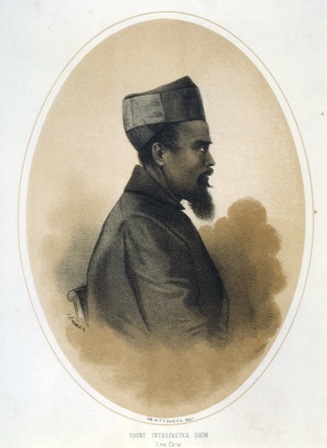
- Makishi Chōchū as depicted in Narrative of The Expedition of an American Squadron to the China Seas and Japan by Matthew C. Perry & Francis L. Hawks, Washington, 1856
- Born: August 16, 1818; Shuri, Ryūkyū Kingdom
- Died: August 14, 1862 (aged 43); Iheya Island, Ryūkyū Kingdom
- Other names: Itarashiki Chōchū; Shō Eikō
- Education: Royal Academy of Ryūkyū
- Occupation: Diplomat
- Years active: 1844-1862
- Title: Pechin

Makishi Pekumi Chōchū (牧志 親雲上 朝忠; August 16, 1818 – August 14, 1862) was a scholar-bureaucrat and diplomat of Ryūkyū Kingdom. He was also known as Itarashiki Chōchū (板良敷 朝忠), and his Chinese style name, Shō Eikō (向 永功).

== Life ==
Makishi was born in Shuri, the capital of Ryūkyū. He studied in Kokugaku (国学 the Royal Academy of Ryūkyū) in his early years. In 1838, he traveled to China to study, and stayed in Beijing for several years. When he came back to Ryūkyū, he learned English from Aniya Seiho (安仁屋 政輔). He was then appointed Ikoku Tsūji (異国通詞, the diplomat towards Western countries) in 1844.
