= Shō Shitsu =

Shō Shitsu 尚質 shoo shichi

King of Ryūkyū
- Reign: 1648–1668
- Predecessor: Shō Ken
- Successor: Shō Tei
- Born: Umitukugani (思徳金); October 1, 1629
- Died: December 20, 1668 (aged 39)
- Burial: Tamaudun, Shuri, Okinawa
- Spouse: Misato Aji-ganashi
- Concubine: Mafē Aji, Honkū; Adaniya Agomo-shirare, Honkō; Miyashiro Agomo-shirare, Keishitsu (naagushiku agumushirari, chiishichi); Moromizato Agomo-shirare, Getsurei (murumijatu agumushirari, gwachirii)
- Issue: Shō Tei, Crown Prince Nakagusuku Chōshū; Shō Kōki, Prince Ōzato Chōryō; Shō Kōjin, Prince Nago Chōgen; Shō Kosai, Prince Chatan Chōai; Shō Kōtoku, Prince Kochinda Chōshun; Shō Kōshin, Prince Motobu Chōhei; Shō Kōzen, Prince Ginowan Chōgi; Princess Adaniya; Princess Moromizato; Princess Yonamine; Princess Ōmine; Princess Miyahira
Names
- Shō Shitsu (尚質)
- House: Second Shō dynasty
- Father: Shō Hō
- Mother: Nishi no Aji-ganashi, Ryōgetsu

Shō Shitsu (尚質; 1 October 1629 – 20 December 1668) was a king of the Ryukyu Kingdom who held the throne from 1648 until his death in 1668.

The fourth son of King Shō Hō, he was named Prince of Sashiki in 1637, at the age of eight, and was granted Sashiki magiri as his domain. In 1645, his domain was changed to that of Nakagusuku magiri, and his title to Prince of Nakagusuku.

== Life ==
Shō Shitsu succeeded his brother Shō Ken as king in 1648. His reign coincided with a period of rebellion and instability in China, as factions loyal to the Ming Dynasty, which fell in 1644, continued to fight against the new Qing Dynasty order. On at least one occasion, Ryukyuan tribute ships were attacked by pirates or rebels, who killed at least one of the Ryukyuan sailors and stole various objects; the authorities of Satsuma Domain declared the head envoy and his deputy to be at fault and had them executed. Another incident involved an attack on an Okinawan mission on the road to Beijing; the Ryukyuans defeated their attackers, and Hirata Tentsu came to be known as a national hero.

Though there was initially some uncertainty, particularly within Japan, as to whether the kingdom should support the new dynasty, or the Ming rebels, the Tokugawa shogunate left the decision up to Satsuma. The king's eldest son, Shō Tei, who would later succeed him as king, journeyed to Beijing and submitted the formal royal seal given the kingdom by the Ming rulers, to the Qing Court, which in turn granted the prince a new royal seal for the kingdom and declared its official recognition of Shō Shitsu as king.

A number of major reforms were effected in the final years of Shō Shitsu's reign, primarily at the guidance or suggestion of Shō Shōken, who was appointed sessei, a position which has been compared to prime minister, in 1666. Shō Shōken also compiled the Chūzan Seikan ("Mirror of Chūzan"), the first history of the kingdom, at the king's orders.

Upon his death in 1668, he was entombed in the royal mausoleum Tamaudun, and was succeeded by his eldest son, Shō Tei.

Regnal titles
| Preceded by Shō Ken | King of Ryūkyū; 1648–1668 | Succeeded by Shō Tei |
