= Shō Eki =

Shō Eki 尚益 shoo 'ichi

King of Ryūkyū
- Reign: 1710–1712
- Predecessor: Shō Tei
- Successor: Shō Kei
- Born: Umigurugani (思五郎金); December 7, 1678
- Died: August 16, 1712 (aged 33)
- Burial: Tamaudun, Shuri
- Spouse: Kon Kō, Kikoe-ōkimi-ganashi (chifi ufujin)
- Concubine: Iri no Aji; Miyagi Agunshitari-agomoshirare; Cinen Agunshitari-agomoshirare
- Issue: Shō Kei, Crown Prince Nakagusuku; Shō Tetsu, Prince Chatan Chōki; Princess Kadekaru; Princess Kohagura; Princess Tomimori; Princess Uchima
Names
- Shō Eki (尚益)
- House: Second Shō dynasty
- Father: Shō Jun
- Mother: Gi Un, Kikoe-ōkimi-ganashi (chifi ufujin)

Shō Eki (尚 益; December 7, 1678 – August 16, 1712) was a king the Ryukyu Kingdom, who ruled from 1710 to 1712.

== Life ==
It was said that he was born with harelip, which made his grandfather Shō Tei worry. A Ryukyuan named Takamine Tokumei met a Chinese doctor Huang Huiyou in Fuzhou. Huang taught Takamine how to repair a cleft palate. Takamine came back to Ryukyu in 1688, and had the Prince's lip repaired in the next year.

Shō Eki succeeded his grandfather Shō Tei as king in 1710, and died two years later.

Regnal titles
| Preceded by Shō Tei | King of Ryūkyū; 1710–1712 | Succeeded by Shō Kei |
