= Shō Kei =

Shō Kei 尚敬
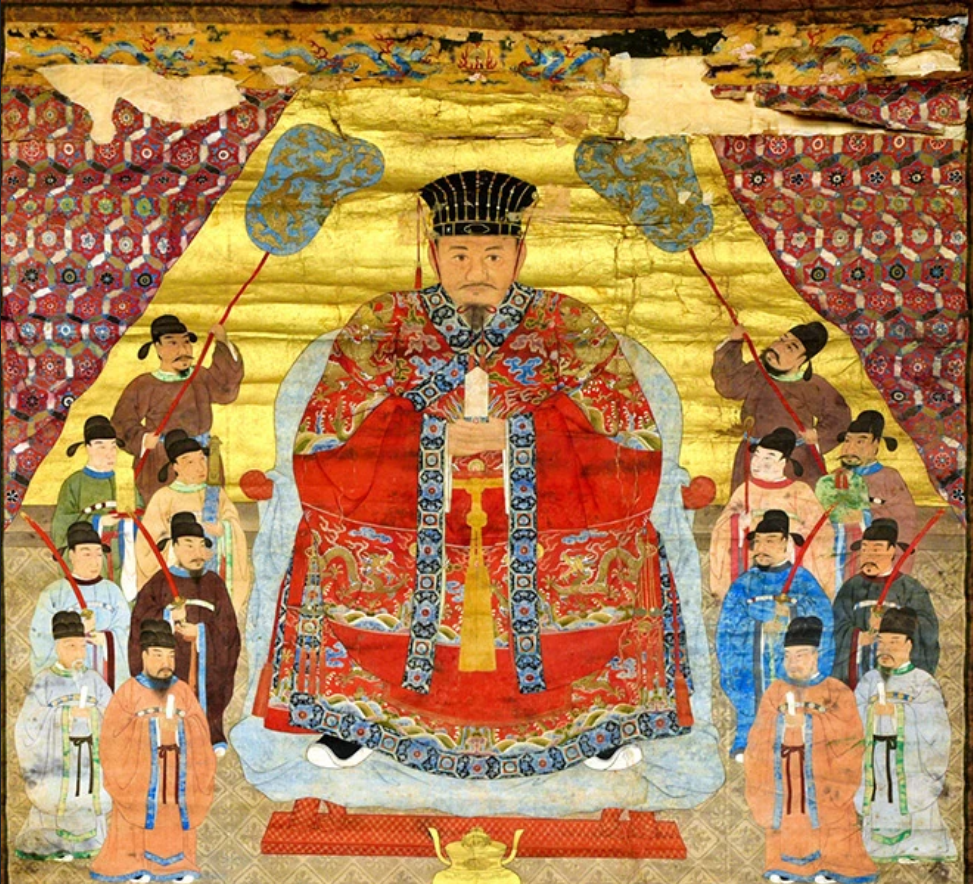
- Official royal portrait of Shō Kei

King of Ryūkyū
- Reign: 1713–1752
- Predecessor: Shō Eki
- Successor: Shō Boku
- Born: Umitukugani (思徳金); August 3, 1700
- Died: March 14, 1752 (aged 51)
- Burial: Tamaudun, Shuri
- Issue: Shō Boku, Crown Prince Nagakusuku; Shō Wa, Prince Yuntanza Chōken (founder of Yuntanza Udun); Princess Tsukayama (Sai On's daughter-in-law); Princess Zukeran; Princess Makadotarugane
Names
- Shō Kei (尚敬)
- Okinawan pronunciation: Shō Chī (尚敬)
- Yamato name: Chōshi (朝糸)
- House: Second Shō dynasty
- Father: Shō Eki
- Mother: Kikoe-ōkimi-ganashi
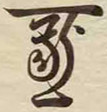
- Signature

Shō Kei (尚 敬; August 3, 1700 – March 14, 1752) was king of the Ryukyu Kingdom from 1713 to 1752. His reign, strongly guided by royal advisor Sai On, is regarded as a political and economic golden age and period of the flowering of Okinawan culture.

== Life ==
After succeeding his father Shō Eki in 1713, Shō Kei appointed his regent and trusted advisor Sai On to the Sanshikan, the Council of Three top royal advisors, in 1728. His reign is known for a great number of developments, including economic reforms and conservation efforts implemented under the guidance of Sai On, political changes, and scholarly developments.

Regnal titles
Preceded by Shō Eki	King of Ryūkyū; 1713–1751	Succeeded by Shō Boku
