= Shō Tei =

Shō Tei 尚貞 shoo tii
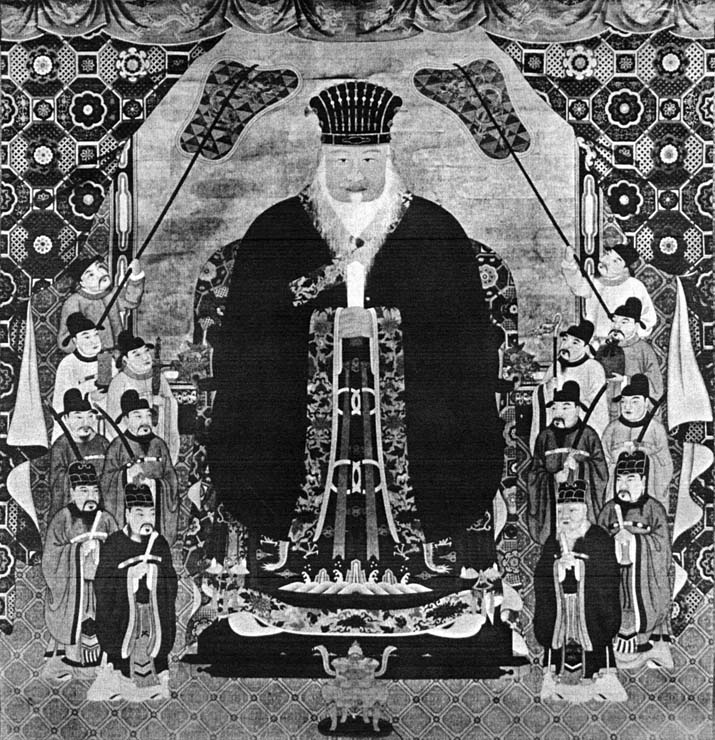

King of Ryūkyū
- Reign: 1669–1709
- Predecessor: Shō Shitsu
- Successor: Shō Eki
- Born: Umigurugani (思五郎金); January 22, 1645
- Died: August 18, 1709 (aged 64)
- Burial: Tamaudun, Shuri, Okinawa
- Spouse: Gesshin, Okuma Aji-ganashi; Jion, Makabe Aji-ganashi
- Concubine: Sengaku, Taketomi Agomo-shirare
- Issue: Shō Jun, Crown Prince Nakagusuku; Shō Kei, Prince Tomigusuku Chōryō; Shō Kō, Prince Oroku Chōki; Shō Ki, Prince Misato Chōtei; Princess Matsudo; Princess Umimazurugane; Princess Uchima; Princess Shikina; Princess Amuro
Names
- Shō Tei (尚貞)
- Yamato name: Chōshū (朝周)
- House: Second Shō dynasty
- Father: Shō Shitsu
- Mother: Misato Aji-ganashi

Shō Tei (尚貞; 22 January 1645 – 18 August 1709) was the 11th King of the Second Shō Dynasty of the Ryukyu Kingdom, who held the throne from 1669 until his death in 1709. He was the ruler of Ryukyu at the time of the compiling of the Chūzan Seifu (a document documenting Ryukyuan history).

== Life ==
Shō Tei received a Confucian education, and was the first Ryukyuan monarch to do so.

Shō Tei was the monarch at the time when the Japanese bakufu began taking notice of trade of Chinese goods passing through the islands, during the period of sakoku (when no contact between Japan and the outside world was foreign policy). The bakufu, instead of punishing the Ryukyuan government, ordered detailed reports on the trade in 1685. The following year, trade was restricted to 2,000 ryō worth per term, and was only able to be sold in markets that did not compete with the Dutch enclave in Nagasaki. The result of such trade made the Ryukyuan economy boom.

Shō Tei is the final Ryukyuan monarch to be given a god's name in official histories, due to the changing image of the position (less a deity, more a Confucian sage).

He was buried at the royal mausoleum Tamaudun in Shuri.

Regnal titles
Preceded by Shō Shitsu	King of Ryūkyū; 1669–1709	Succeeded by Shō Eki
