= Shō Boku =

14th king of the Ryukyu Kingdom

Shō Boku 尚穆 shoo buku
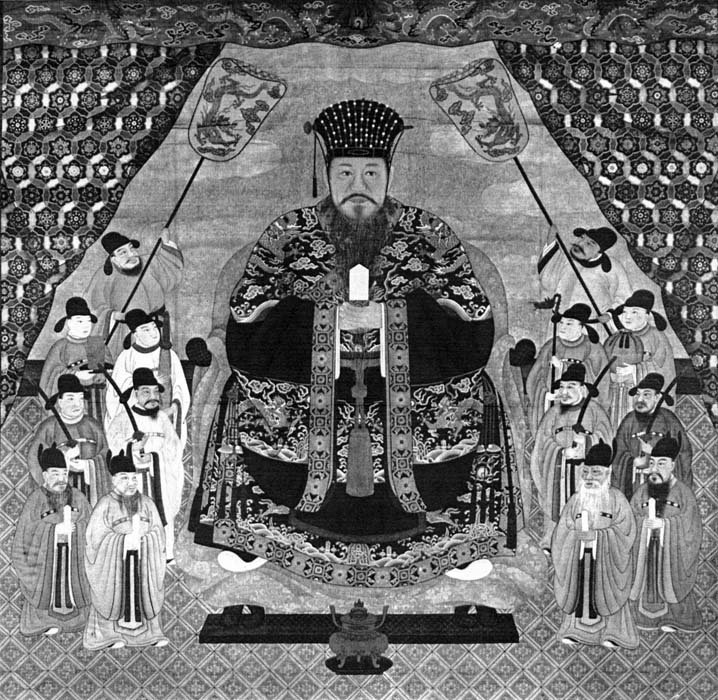
- A painting of Shō Boku by Sho Genko

King of Ryūkyū
- Reign: 1752–1794
- Predecessor: Shō Kei
- Successor: Shō On
- Born: Umigurugani (思五郎金); May 3, 1739
- Died: February 19, 1794 (aged 54)
- Burial: Tamaudun, Shuri
- Spouse: Sashiki Ajiganashi
- Concubine: Mahae Ajiganashi; Adaniya Agunshitari-agomoshirare; Miyazato Agunshitari-agomoshirare; Yogi Agunshitari-agomoshirare
- Issue: Shō Tetsu, Crown Prince Nakagusuku; Shō Zu, Prince Urasoe Chōō (founder of Urasoe Udun); Shō Shū, Prince Yoshimura Chōgi (founder of Yoshimura Udun); Shō Yō, Prince Ginowan Chōshō; Shō Kaku, Prince Misato Chōki (founder of Misato Udun); Onkametaru, Kikoe Ōkimi; Princess Onaha; Princess Uema
Names
- Shō Ki (尚喜), later Shō Boku (尚穆)
- Yamato name: Chōkō (朝康)
- House: Second Shō dynasty
- Father: Shō Kei
- Mother: Kikoe-ōkimi-ganashi

Shō Boku (尚 穆; May 3, 1739 – February 19, 1794) was a king of Ryukyu. His reign began in 1752.

== Life ==
Although a period of relative stability, he had to contend with a tsunami in 1771 that devastated the Miyako Islands and Yaeyama Islands. His reign also saw the Chinese envoy Chou Huang who wrote a sixteen volume topography of the islands for the Qianlong Emperor.

Regnal titles
Preceded by Shō Kei	King of Ryūkyū; 1752–1794	Succeeded by Shō On
