= Shō Kō =

Shō Kō 尚灝
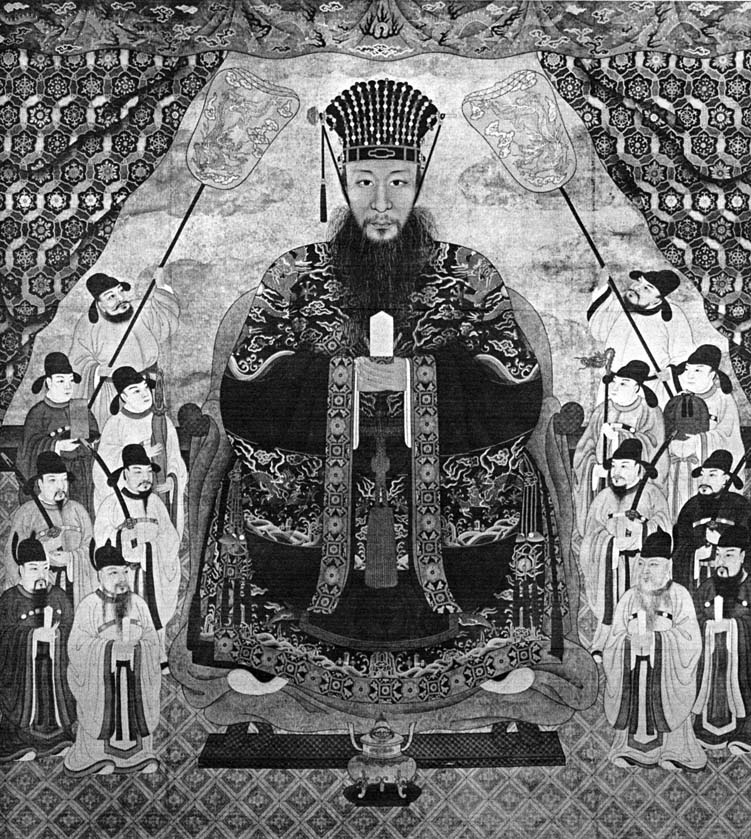
- Official royal portrait of Shō Kō, painted by Mō Chōki in 1837.

King of Ryūkyū
- Reign: 1804–1828
- Predecessor: Shō Sei
- Successor: Shō Iku
- Born: Umijirugani (思次良金); 14 July 1787
- Died: 5 July 1834 (aged 46)
- Spouse: Omokametarugane, Sashiki Aji-ganashi
- Concubine: See list: Mamatsugane, Gushiken Aji-ganashi Manabetaru, Kohagura Aji-ganashi Maushigane, Onaha Agunshitari-agomoshirare Makadotaru, Zakimi Agunshitari-agomoshirare Omodogane, Matayoshi Agunshitari-agomoshirare Matsurugane, Miyagi Agunshitari-agomoshirare Makuresegane, Uema Agunshitari-agomoshirare Omotaketarugane, Nakanishi Agunshitari-agomoshirare Omokametaru, Janatō Agunshitari-agomoshirare
- Issue: See list: Shō Iku, Crown Prince Nagagusuku Prince Shō Yō Omonabetaru, Princess Onaga Shō Ton, Prince Ōzato Chōkyō Shō Ken, Prince Ie Chōchoku Matsurugane, Kikoe-ōkimi-ganashi Omokanegane, Princess Shikina Prince Shō I Makuresegane, Princess Kamida Matsurugane, Princess Kadekaru Omokametaru, Princess Yonaha Shō Ken, Prince Yoshimura Chōshō Makadotarugane, Princess Miyahira Maushigane, Princess Amuro Princess Omokanetarugane Manabetaru, Princess Onaha Maakarigane, Princess Ishimine Princess Omodogane Shō Shū, Prince Nago Chōmu Omotakeuhugane, Princess Kakeboku Omodogane, Princess Makishi Maushigane, Princess Asato Shō Shin, Prince Tamagawa Chōtatsu Princess Maushi Prince Shō Ten
Names
- Shō Kō (尚灝)
Era dates
- Jiaqing 嘉慶; Daoguang 道光
- Yamato name: Chōshō (朝相)
- House: Second Shō dynasty
- Father: Shō Tetsu
- Mother: Manabetarugane, Kikoe-ōgimi ganashi

Shō Kō (尚灝) (14 July 1787 – 5 July 1834) was a king of the Ryukyu Kingdom, who held the throne from 1804 to 1828, when he was forced to abdicate in favor of his son, Shō Iku. This was only the second time in the history of the kingdom that a king abdicated; the 1477 abdication of Shō Sen'i was the first.

== Life ==
It is said that towards the end of his reign, Shō Kō's "behavior became strange, unbalanced, and unpredictable." The Sanshikan (the council of the top three elder royal advisors) appealed to the government of Japan's Satsuma Domain and, with Satsuma's approval, forced Shō Kō to abdicate in 1828 and to retire to the countryside. An envoy mission was prepared to formally inform Beijing of the change in rulership, and a second royal manor was established in the countryside, to maintain the prestige and dignities appropriate to Shō Kō's status.

Historian George H. Kerr suggests the possibility that Shō Kō did not in fact suffer from any mental illness, but rather contemplated radical actions such as seeking the kingdom's full independence from Satsuma, to which it was a vassal tributary, in the hopes that this would alleviate the intense economic difficulties faced by the kingdom. If this were the case, perhaps the Sanshikan feared that such action was too radical, and too risky, and felt the need to prevent the king from going through with it.

Regnal titles
Preceded by Shō Sei	King of Ryūkyū; 1804–1828	Succeeded by Shō Iku
