= Mamoru Shō =

Head of former Ryukyuan royal family

- 尚 衞
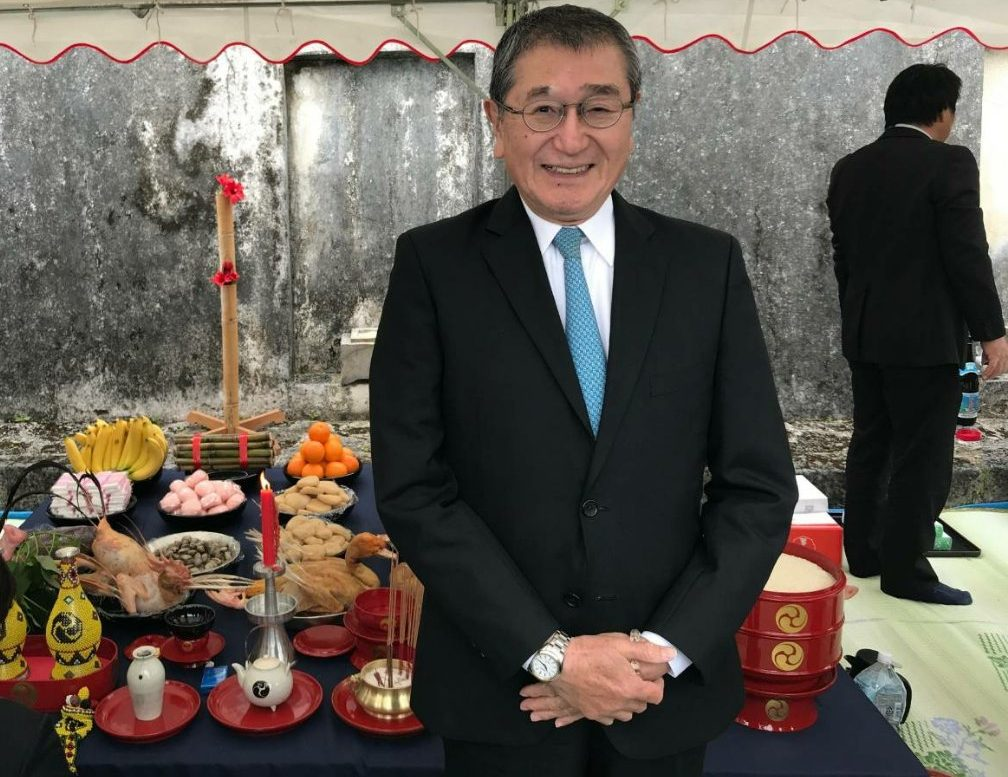
- Shō in 2019
- Born: 18 August 1950 (age 76); Tokyo, Japan
- Occupation: Businessman
- Children: 4
- Parent(s): Hiroshi Shō (father); Keiko Shō (mother)

Mamoru Shō (尚 衞, Shō Mamoru; born 18 August 1950) is an ethnic Ryukyuan businessman who is the current head of the Shō family, the former Ryukyuan royal family. He lives in Ise City, Mie Prefecture.

== Life ==
Mamoru Shō was born in Tokyo on 18 August 1950, the eldest son of Hiroshi Shō. After graduating from Tamagawa University, he obtained an MBA from Samford University.

He is the great-great-grandson of Shō Tai, the last king of the Ryukyu Kingdom, and became the Shō family head upon the death of his father on 30 August 1996. In May 2019, he established the Ryukyu History and Culture Inheritance Promotion Association and currently serves as its representative director. He has also donated a number of family documents and artefacts to Naha City for preservation.

== Family ==
Shō formally adopted a married couple, Takayuki and Maki, into his family, following a Japanese custom known as fūfu yōshi. Shō has a biological son named Takeru, whom he has declined to appoint as his heir apparent, instead endorsing Takayuki and Maki. Maki serves as the current acting Kikoe-ōgimi.

- Father: Hiroshi Shō
- Mother: Keiko Shō (尚啓子)
- Wife: Midori Iwanabe (岩辺みどり, divorced)
  - Son: Takeru Shō (尚猛)
  - Adoptive son: Takayuki Shō (尚孝之)
  - Adoptive daughter: Maki Shō (尚満喜)

== Ancestry ==
Ancestors of Mamoru Shō

16. Shō Tai, King of Ryūkyū, 1st Marquess Shō (1843–1901)
8. Shō Ten, Prince of Nakagusuku, 2nd Marquess Shō (1864–1920)
17. Kuwayasushiru
4. Shō Shō, 3rd Marquess Shō (1888–1923)
18. Chōon, 13th Prince of Kin
9. Shō Shōko (b. 1865)
2. Shō Hiroshi, 4th Marquess Shō (1918–1996)
20. Ogasawara Tadayoshi, 9th Lord of Kokura (1827–1865)
10. Count Ogasawara Tadanobu, 10th Lord of Kokura (1862–1897)
21. Yanagisawa
5. Lady Ogasawara Momoko (1896–1950)
22. Uesugi Narinori, 12th Lord of Yonezawa (1820–1889)
11. Uesugi Junko (1866–1901)
23. Suzuki (1826–1903)
1. Shō Mamoru
6. Murase Shinzaburo
3. Murase Keiko (born 1920)

== Descent from Kings of Ryukyu ==
Patrilineal descent

^The further ancestry of Second Shō dynasty is still in dispute by historians as of today. However, according to the kingdom’s official history record, Sai On’s edition of Chūzan Seifu, the family were descended of Gihon, who was the third and the last king of Shunten dynasty that was founded by its first king, Shunten, who was mythologically a son of Minamoto no Tametomo from the Kawachi branch of the Seiwa Genji clan through his marriage with a sister of the Aji of Ōzato, which made the dynasty's lineage went back further to the Imperial House of Japan via Emperor Seiwa. However this still considered by most historians as a fabrication to justify the ruling claim during the invasion by Satsuma Domain.

1. Shō Shoku (Note: A peasant in Izena Island and the father of the first member who became a king, but died before his son ascended to the throne, and posthumously honored as king in 1699, but later stripped in 1719) (?-1434)
2. Shō En (Note: formerly a peasant in Izena Island and later fled to different islands and finally held many official positions during the era of First Shō dynasty, included being a retainer for the Prince of Goeku (later become Shō Taikyū), then also held the title of the Lord of Uchima under the name “Kanamaru” before became the first member of the family to ascended to the throne as the king via his coup d'état on Shō Toku, the last king of the previous dynasty) (1415-1476), King of Ryukyu Kingdom
3. Shō Shin (Note: formerly Prince of Kume Nakagusuku) (1465-1527), King of Ryukyu Kingdom
4. Shō Sei (Note: formerly Prince of Nakagusuku) (1497-1555), King of Ryukyu Kingdom
5. Shō Gen (Note: formerly Prince of Kume Nakagusuku) (1528-1572), King of Ryukyu Kingdom
6. Shō Kyū (Note: the first Prince of Kin under the name "Chōkō", founder of the Kin Palace royal branch and posthumously honored as king in 1699, but later stripped in 1719) (1560-1620), Prince of Kin
7. Shō Hō (Note: formerly Prince of Sashiki under the name "Chōshō") (1590-1640), King of Ryukyu Kingdom
8. Shō Shitsu (Note: formerly Prince of Sashiki) (1629-1668), King of Ryukyu Kingdom
9. Shō Tei (Note: formerly Prince of Nakagusuku under the name "Chōshū") (1645-1709), King of Ryukyu Kingdom
10. Shō Jun (Note: A heir to the throne, but died before being able to ascended to the throne) (1660-1707), Prince of Nakagusuku
11. Shō Eki (Note: formerly Prince of Sashiki, Prince of Yuntanza, and Prince of Nakagusuku) (1678-1712), King of Ryukyu Kingdom
12. Shō Kei (Note: formerly Prince of Nakagusuku under the name "Chōshi") (1700-1752), King of Ryukyu Kingdom
13. Shō Boku (Note: formerly Prince of Nakagusuku under the name "Chōkō") (1739-1794), King of Ryukyu Kingdom
14. Shō Tetsu (Note: A heir to the throne, but died before being able to ascended to the throne) (1759-1788), Prince of Nakagusuku
15. Shō Kō (Note: formerly under the name "Chōshō") (1787-1834), King of Ryukyu Kingdom
16. Shō Iku (Note: formerly Prince of Nakagusuku under the name "Chōken") (1813-1847), King of Ryukyu Kingdom
17. Shō Tai (Note: formerly Prince of Nakagusuku under the name "Chōken" and the last king before the annexation of the kingdom and a first to earned the title of Marquess during the establishment of the peerage system) (1843-1901), King of Ryukyu Kingdom and Ryukyu Domain, Marquess of Shō Family
18. Shō Ten (Note: formerly and the final heir to the throne under the name "Chōku" and not able to ascend the throne before the annexation of the kingdom) (1864-1920), Prince of Nakagusuku, Marquess of Shō Family
19. Shō Shō (1888-1923), Marquess of Shō Family
20. Shō Hiroshi (Note: formerly and the last Marquess of the family before the abolition of the peerage system) (1918-1997), Marquess of Shō Family
21. Shō Mamoru (1950-)

== Notes ==
Titles in pretence
Preceded by Hiroshi Shō	— TITULAR — Shō family head 1996–present	Incumbent
