= Hiroshi Shō =

Japanese marquess (1918–1997)

Marquess Hiroshi Shō
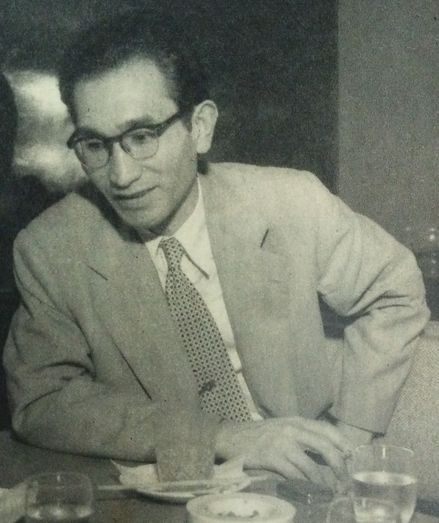
- Hiroshi Shō in 1956
- Born: September 18, 1918; Shuri, Okinawa
- Died: August 30, 1997 (aged 78); Tokyo, Japan
- Occupation: Businessman
- Spouse(s): Shō Eiko (née Tozawa); Shō Keiko (née Murase)
- Children: Nozu Keiko, Mamoru Shō
- Parent(s): Shō Shō (father); Shō Momoko (mother)

Marquess Hiroshi Shō (尚裕, Shō Hiroshi; 18 September 1918 – 30 August 1997) was the head of the Shō family, the former Ryūkyūan royal family. He was the great-grandson of Shō Tai, the last king of the Ryukyu Kingdom, and was the last member of the family to hold the title of Marquess (侯爵, kōshaku). Like most members of the kazoku system of peerage, and all heads of the Shō family since the abolition of the Ryukyu Kingdom, he lived in Tokyo for his whole life.

== Life ==
Hiroshi Shō was born the eldest son of Shō Shō with Momoko Ogasawara. Upon his father's death on 19 June 1923, and at the age of five, he became head of the family and inherited the family title of Marquess. He graduated from Tokyo Imperial University earning a degree in East Asian history from the Department of Literature.

He served for a time as a captain in the Japanese Imperial Navy. He was also active in the business world, working with various institutions, including Shō Enterprises, where he was representative director. He lost his title, as did all other members of the kazoku system of peerage, with the implementation of the post-war Constitution of Japan in 1947.

Late in life, in the 1990s, Shō donated many Shō family possessions, including artworks, ritual objects, historical documents, the royal mausoleum of Tamaudun and royal gardens of Shikina-en to the City of Naha. He also donated artworks, documents, and other family possessions to the city of Urasoe and village of Izena. Shō died on 30 August 1997. His funeral was held in Tokyo, though he was entombed in Izena Tamaudun on the Okinawan island of Izena. His son, Mamoru Shō (尚衞), became head of the royal Shō family afterwards.

== Family ==
- Father: Shō Shō (1888–1923)
- Mother: Momoko Ogasawara (1896–1950)
- Wives:
  - Tozawa Eiko (1919–1945)
  - Keiko (b.1920)
- Children: four daughters and one son
  - Kazuko (b.1943)
  - Yoshiko (b.1945)
  - Keiko (b.1947) married Kabaya Nozu
  - Kaoru (b.1949)
  - Mamoru Shō (b. 1950)

== Ancestry ==
Ancestors of Hiroshi Shō

16. Shō Iku, King of Ryūkyū (1813-1847)
8. Shō Tai, King of Ryūkyū, 1st Marquess Shō (1843-1901)
17. Sashiki Aji-ganashi
4. Shō Ten, Prince of Nakagusuku, 2nd Marquess Shō (1864-1920)
9. Kuwayasushiru
2. Shō Shō, 3rd Marquess Shō (1888-1923)
10. Kintake Asaoda
5. Kintake Shōko (b. 1865)
1. Shō Hiroshi, 4th Marquess Shō
24. Ogasawara Nagatake, 5th Lord of Anji (1809-1839)
12. Ogasawara Tadayoshi, 9th Lord of Kokura (1827-1865)
25. Toda (1813-1858)
6. Count Ogasawara Tadanobu, 10th Lord of Kokura (1862-1897)
26. Yanagisawa Satoaki, 6th Lord of Mikkaichi (1809-1843)
13. Yanagisawa
27. Hori Yadaiko (1812-1870)
3. Lady Ogasawara Momoko (1896-1950)
28. Uesugi Narisada, 11th Lord of Yonezawa (1788-1839)
14. Uesugi Narinori, 12th Lord of Yonezawa (1820-1889)
29. Hatakeyama
7. Uesugi Junko (1866-1901)
15. Suzuki (1826-1903)

Titles of nobility
Preceded by Shō Shō	Marquess; 1923–1947	Title abolished
Titles in pretence
Preceded by Shō Shō	— TITULAR — Shō family head 1923–1996	Succeeded by Mamoru Shō
