= Ryukyuan assimilation policies =

Ryukyuan assimilation policies are a series of practices aimed at the Ryukyuan people with the intent of assimilating them into Japanese culture and identity beginning shortly before the Disposition of Ryukyu in 1879 and continuing to the present day.

== Background ==
In 1879, the Japanese Empire abolished the Ryukyu Domain, exiling its monarch to Tokyo. Okinawa Prefecture was established out of the newly acquired territory. The Amami Islands were already a part of Japan due to the Satsuma Invasion of Ryukyu, and were made a part of Kagoshima Prefecture after the fall of the Satsuma Domain.

== History ==
Years after the annexation, Japan started to implement assimilation policies into the Ryukyu Islands. A famous example was the dialect cards (方言札, hōgen fuda), which were given out to students who spoke a Ryukyuan vernacular at school. Punishments for card-holders were often corporal.

The mainland Japanese also looked down on Ryukyuan culture as being "backwards", accelerating the process even further. The same phenomenon happened in diaspora communities as well, including Hawaii, where local Okinawans were often stereotyped negatively by other Nikkei immigrants.

Discrimination heightened during World War II, where many Okinawans were killed for speaking Okinawan under the suspicion of spying.

== See also ==
- Ryūkyū Disposition
- Cultural assimilation
