= Ryukyu Disposition =

Japanese annexation of the Ryukyu Kingdom

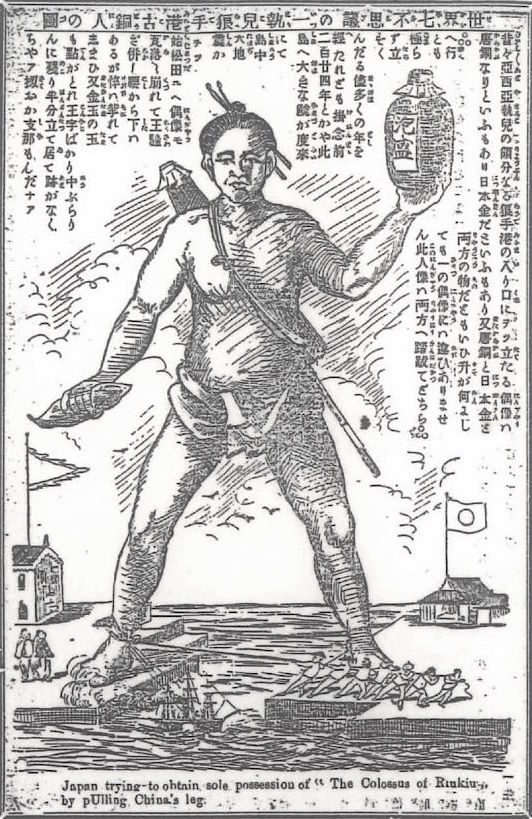
Cartoon from Marumaru Chinbun, 24 May 1879, with the caption "Japan trying to obtain sole possession of the 'Colossus of Riukiu' by pulling China's leg"; playing upon the Colossus of Rhodes, the figure stands with one foot in China one in Japan, and carries a jar, identifiable from its label (泡盛), of the distinctive Ryūkyūan awamori

The Ryukyu Disposition (琉球処分, Ryūkyū shobun; Okinawan: Rūchū shubun), also called the Ryukyu Annexation (琉球併合, Ryūkyū heigō) or the annexation of Okinawa, was the political process during the early years of the Meiji period that saw the incorporation of the former Ryukyu Kingdom into the Empire of Japan as Okinawa Prefecture (i.e., one of Japan's "home" prefectures) and its decoupling from the Chinese tributary system. These processes began with the creation of the Ryukyu Domain in 1872 and culminated in the kingdom's annexation and final dissolution in 1879; immediate diplomatic fallout and consequent negotiations with Qing China, brokered by Ulysses S. Grant, effectively came to an end late the following year. The term is also sometimes used more narrowly in relation to the events and changes of 1879 alone. The Ryūkyū Disposition has been "alternatively characterized as aggression, annexation, national unification, or internal reform".

== Background ==
Early in the Edo period, with the invasion of 1609, the Ryukyu Kingdom entered into a vassal-suzerain relationship with the Japanese Satsuma Domain, also sending a series of missions over the following two hundred and fifty years to Edo, the de facto capital of Tokugawa Japan. At the same time, the Kingdom continued its tributary relationship with Imperial China, both receiving and sending missions; this dual status is sometimes reflected through a four character idiom that means "belonging to the family both of Nippon and Shina" (日支両属). Thus the political status of the Ryūkyūs vis-à-vis the rest of Japan was exceptional in at least three ways: part of the han system, but not directly; ruled over by kings; and the locus of semi-autonomous diplomatic ties with foreign powers, despite sakoku or the "closed country" policy.

The years following the Meiji Restoration of 1868 saw not only the abolition of the han system (Ryūkyū subject for the time being to the jurisdiction of Kagoshima Prefecture) but also efforts to "consolidate" the borders of the new nation state. With the Mudan incident, the massacre of dozens of shipwrecked Ryūkyūans (from the Miyako Islands) in Qing-ruled Taiwan in 1871, the "Ryūkyū problem" was brought to the fore. In May the following year, negotiations with China over the incident still ongoing, Vice Treasury Minister Inoue Kaoru proposed annexation of the Ryūkyūs, arguing that they had long been subordinate to Satsuma, and that their "return to Japanese jurisdiction" would allow for a "single system for the homeland".

== Disposition ==
In the New Year of 1872, Narahara Shigeru and Ijichi Sadaka crossed to Ryūkyū where, in discussion with court officials, they agreed to waive the Kingdom's former debts to the Shimazu clan of Satsuma. Then in July, the Ryūkyū government was informed it should send its congratulations on the success of the Meiji Restoration. Prince Ie and Ginowan Uēkata were duly dispatched to Tōkyō, arriving early in September. Meeting with the Meiji Emperor on the 14th, they presented their letter (originally signed by "King of Ryūkyū, Shō Tai, Kingdom of Ryūkyū", but amended in consultation with the Ministry of Foreign Affairs to "Shō Tai of Ryūkyū") and listened to a speech by the Emperor in which he referred to the long history of subordinate status to Satsuma. The Emperor also had Minister of Foreign Affairs Soejima Taneomi read out an Imperial Proclamation in which Shō Tai was elevated to "King of the Ryūkyū Domain" (琉球藩王, Ryūkyū Han Ō) (despite the earlier abolition of the han system). According to Gregory Smits, "Strictly speaking, the establishment of the Domain of Ryukyu marked the start of the Ryūkyū shobun." This was followed a fortnight later by a decree of the Dajō-kan whereby the treaties agreed in the 1850s between the Ryūkyūs and US, France, and the Netherlands were inherited by Tōkyō.

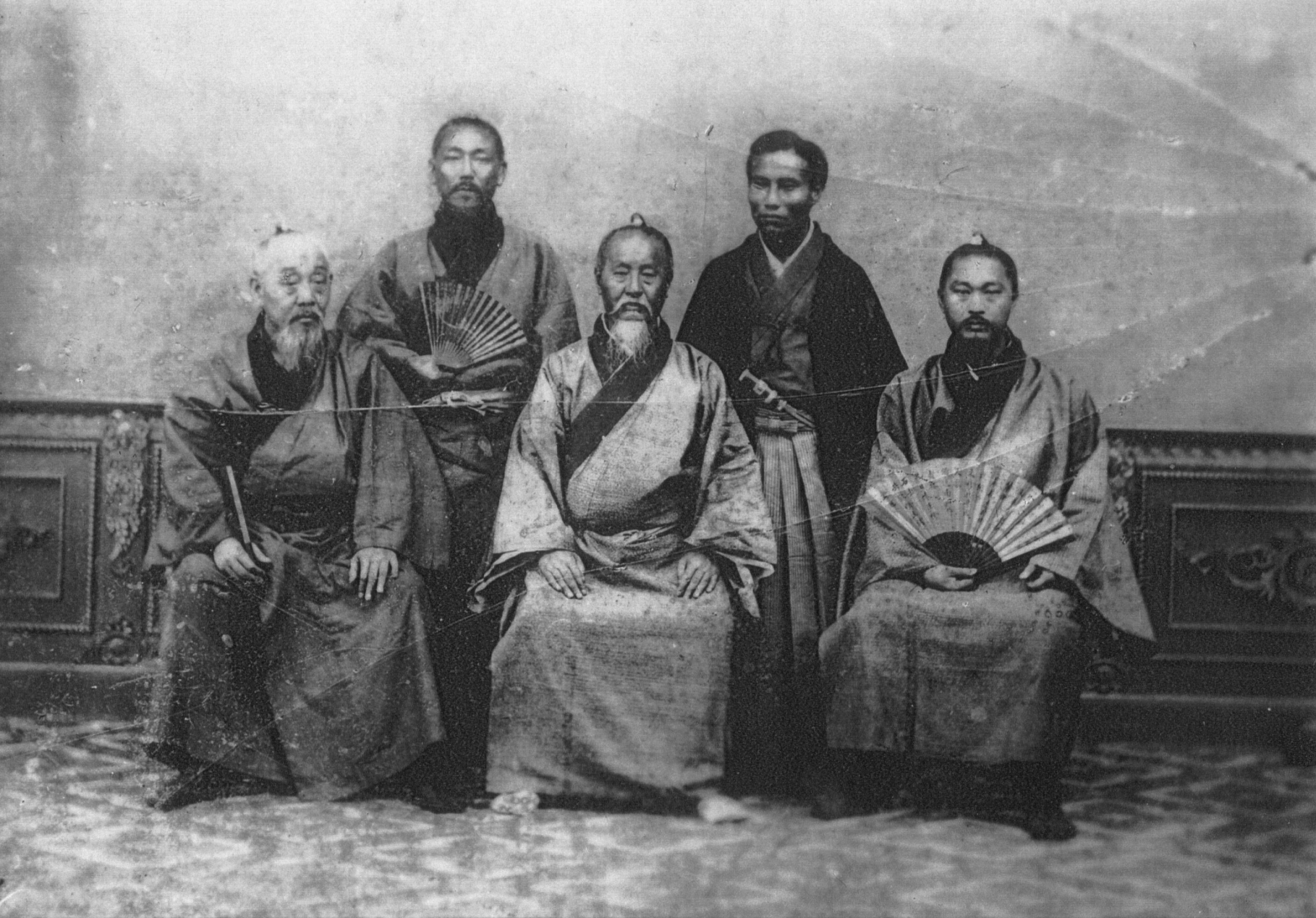
Envoys sent by the Ryukyu Kingdom to extend its congratulations for the success of the Meiji Restoration; from the left, in the front row, Giwan Chōho (Ginowan Uēkata), Prince Ie, Pechin Kyan Chōfu (father of Kyan Chōtoku), back row, Yamasato Pechin, an official from the Ministry of Foreign Affairs

In May 1874, Japan launched a punitive expedition against Taiwan; Britain acting as mediator, in the peace settlement of 31 October that year, China not only agreed to pay an indemnity but also referred to the Ryūkyūans as "subjects of Japan" (日本国属民), a fact described the following year by Gustave Boissonade as "the happiest outcome of the treaty". Meanwhile, on 12 July 1874, responsibility for the Ryūkyūs was transferred from the Ministry of Foreign Affairs to the Home Ministry. In November 1874, the Ryūkyū government sent a tributary mission to China, drawing criticism from Home Minister Ōkubo Toshimichi, who set out in a report of enquiry a number of steps to be taken to address the Ryūkyū Domain's adherence to "ancient outdated laws" and failure to see "reason", while senior Domain officials were summonsed to Tōkyō.

In March 1875, the Japanese government decided upon the "disposition" of the domain. Home Ministry official Matsuda Michiyuki was appointed Disposition Officer (処分官) and sent with over seventy envoys to Ryūkyū. Entering Shuri Castle on 14 July, they met with Prince Nakijin, Shō Tai being indisposed, and presented a list of nine demands: (1) an end to the sending of tributary and congratulatory missions to China, and (2) to the reception of Chinese envoys in return; (3) adoption of Japanese era names; (4) the dispatch of three officials to Tōkyō in relation to implementation of a new code of criminal law; (5) reform of Domain administration and hierarchies; (6) the dispatch of ten or so students to Tōkyō for study; (7) abolition of the Ryūkyū-kan in Fujian; (8) a visit to Tōkyō by the King; and (9) the establishment of a Japanese garrison. The local government agreed to the sending of officials and students and to a minimal garrison, while rejecting sole use of the Japanese nengō, domestic reform (citing societal differences), and restriction of its diplomatic rights, excusing Shō Tai from travel due to his illness. In his report to Premier Sanjō Sanetomi of 25 September, a frustrated Matsuda made mention of the possible future abolition of Ryūkyū Domain and establishment in its place of Okinawa Prefecture.

In September 1876, a barracks was completed near the port of Naha and twenty-five soldiers from the Kumamoto garrison installed. Three months later, the Ryūkyū Domain sent a secret mission to China, where they drew attention to Japanese interference in their tributary missions. In 1878, Chinese diplomat He Ruzhang would meet twice with Minister of Foreign Affairs Terashima Munenori to complain of the end to diplomatic relations with Ryūkyū. A few months earlier, Ryūkyū representatives in Tōkyō sent secret letters to their US, French, and Dutch counterparts to complain of Japan's treatment and attempt to secure assistance. Some fourteen petitions were also submitted to the Japanese government, requesting a return to the old system of dual allegiance, arguing that "Japan is our father, China our mother", but meeting with the response that "to serve two emperors is like a wife serving two husbands". At the close of the year, Home Minister Itō Hirobumi having taken the decision to replace the domain with a prefecture, Ryūkyū officials were expelled from Tōkyō and their official residence in the city closed.

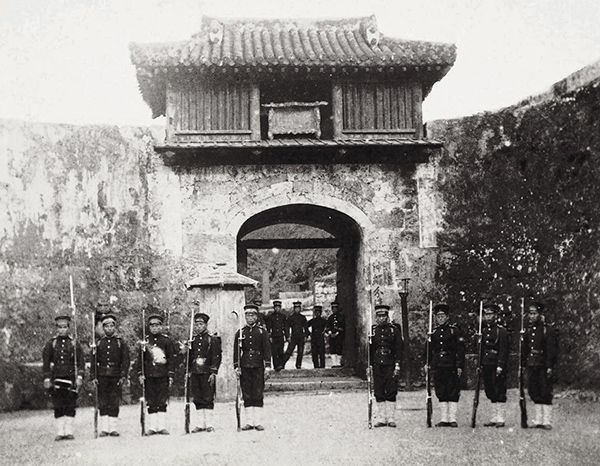
Japanese government forces in front of Kankaimon gate in Shuri Castle at the time of Ryūkyū shobun

In January 1879, Matsuda sailed south a second time, meeting with Domain officials in Shuri and reading out a message from Sanjō Sanetomi demanding severance of diplomatic ties with China. By letter and through his officials, Shō Tai responded that failure to pay tribute and offer congratulations would be punished by China, and sought understanding for the "difficulty of his position". On 11 March 1879, Matsuda received his instructions from Sanjō Sanetomi to travel to Ryūkyū once more. This time he took with him, in addition to thirty-two officials from the Home Ministry and nine other officers, one hundred and sixty policemen, and three or four hundred soldiers, from the Kumamoto garrison. Arriving in Naha on the 25th, two days later Disposition Officer Matsuda gave notice to Prince Nakijin that, on the last day of the month, Ryūkyū han would be abolished and Okinawa ken instituted, instructing that Shuri Castle be vacated by that date. On the 29th the king departed and two days later Matsuda marched unopposed with his men into Shuri Castle. On 5 April, on the front page of the Yomiuri Shimbun, the Dajō-kan announced to the public that Ryūkyū Domain had been abolished and Okinawa Prefecture created in its place. A few days later, the Emperor sent Tominokōji Hironao to enquire into Shō Tai's health and invite him to Tōkyō, placing the Meiji Maru at the former king's disposal; Shō Tai's illness ongoing, Tominokōji returned instead with Shō Ten. After some further weeks of delay, possibly with a view to giving China time to intervene (leading Ryūkyūans crossed over to the continent and a letter from Prince Gong was sent to the Japanese ministry in Beijing drawing attention to China's respect for Ryūkyū's sovereignty and calling on Japan to abandon its plans, the response being that this was an internal affair and other countries had no right to interfere), on 27 May Shō Tai sailed for Tōkyō, where, after an audience with the Emperor, he took up his position as Marquis in the kazoku peerage system.

As Smits notes, however, the "issue of Ryukyuan sovereignty ... was not yet settled in the international arena". With the Qing government vehemently protesting the annexation, spurred on by hawks advocating armed resolution, the Ryūkyū question became an important contributing factor in the build up to the First Sino-Japanese War. At the urging of Li Hongzhang, and after mediation by visiting former US President Ulysses S. Grant, in 1880 Japan entered into negotiations with China. Both sides proposed to divide the Ryūkyūs: Japan offered to hand over some of its home territory, in the form of the Yaeyama Islands and Miyako Islands, in return for revision of the Sino-Japanese Friendship and Trade Treaty, whereby Japan might trade in the interior of China and be accorded most favoured nation status; the Chinese proposed Amami Ōshima and the surrounding islands go to Japan, Okinawa to the Ryūkyū King, and the Yaeyama and Miyako Islands to China, which would then restore them to the Ryūkyū King. Negotiations reached an advanced stage, but at the end of the year China refused to ratify the agreement and the status quo continued. Meanwhile, in its "Memorandum of Japan's sovereign rights to the Ryūkyū Islands, in response to the Chinese government's protest", the Meiji government advanced a number of factors in support of the legitimacy of its claims, citing geographic, historic, racial, linguistic, religious, and cultural propinquity, and stated that, with the abolition of the han, Ryūkyū was the final domestic territory to be reformed and brought under centralized government control. Within Okinawa itself, Japan's victory in the First Sino-Japanese War brought any lingering discontent to an end.

== Legacy of the term ==
After the war, the term Ryūkyū shobun saw reuse in relation to the status of the Ryūkyūs per Article 3 of the Treaty of San Francisco, to representatives of Okinawa being left out of talks relating to Reversion, and to the failure of the Japanese government to live up to the promises made during these negotiations. Prime Minister Satō Eisaku was even accused in the Diet of contributing to a new Ryūkyū shobun in the context of the lack of Okinawan representation in the Reversion negotiations. On the occasion of the second anniversary of Reversion, the Okinawa Times referred to this as the Okinawa shobun. More recently, editorials in the Ryūkyū Shimpō and elsewhere have used the term Ryūkyū shobun in relation to the question of US military bases on Okinawan soil.

== Related images and articles ==
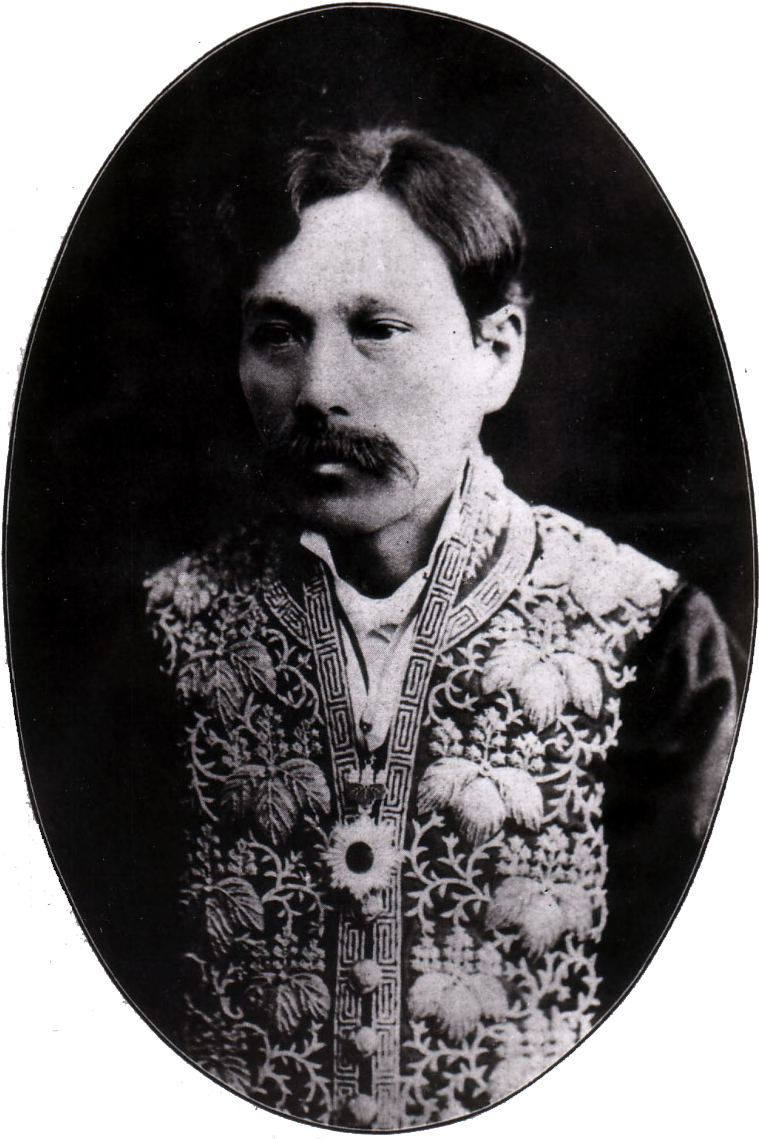
Disposition Officer Matsuda Michiyuki

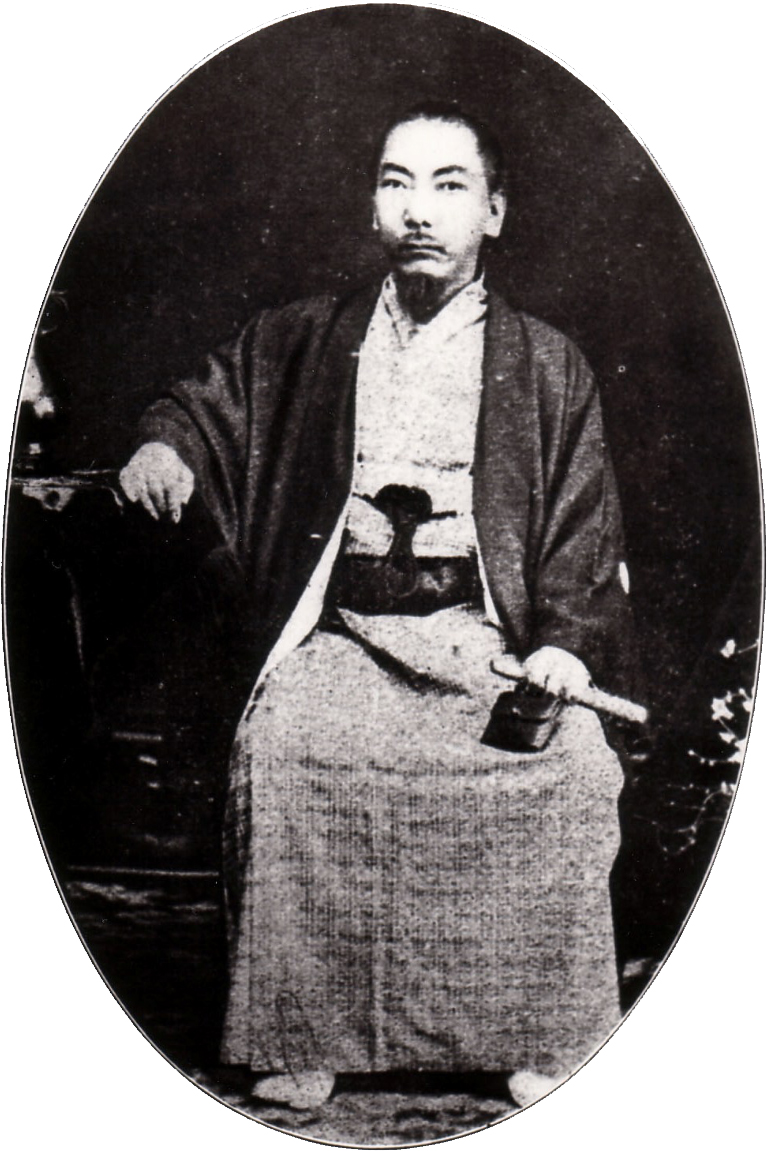
Shō Tai, last king of the Ryukyu Kingdom

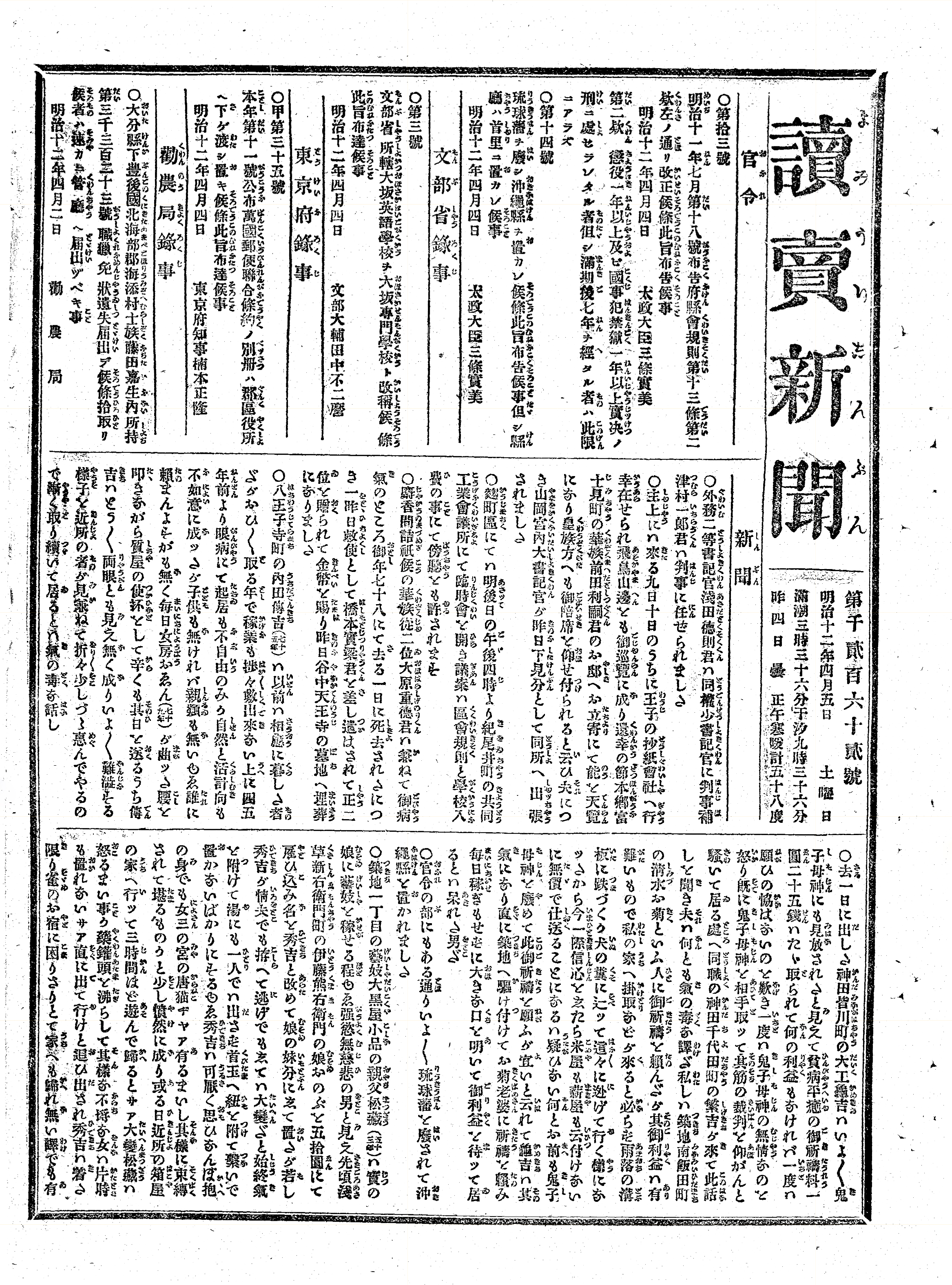
Front page of the Yomiuri Shimbun on 5 April 1879, announcing the abolition of Ryukyu Domain and establishment of Okinawa Prefecture

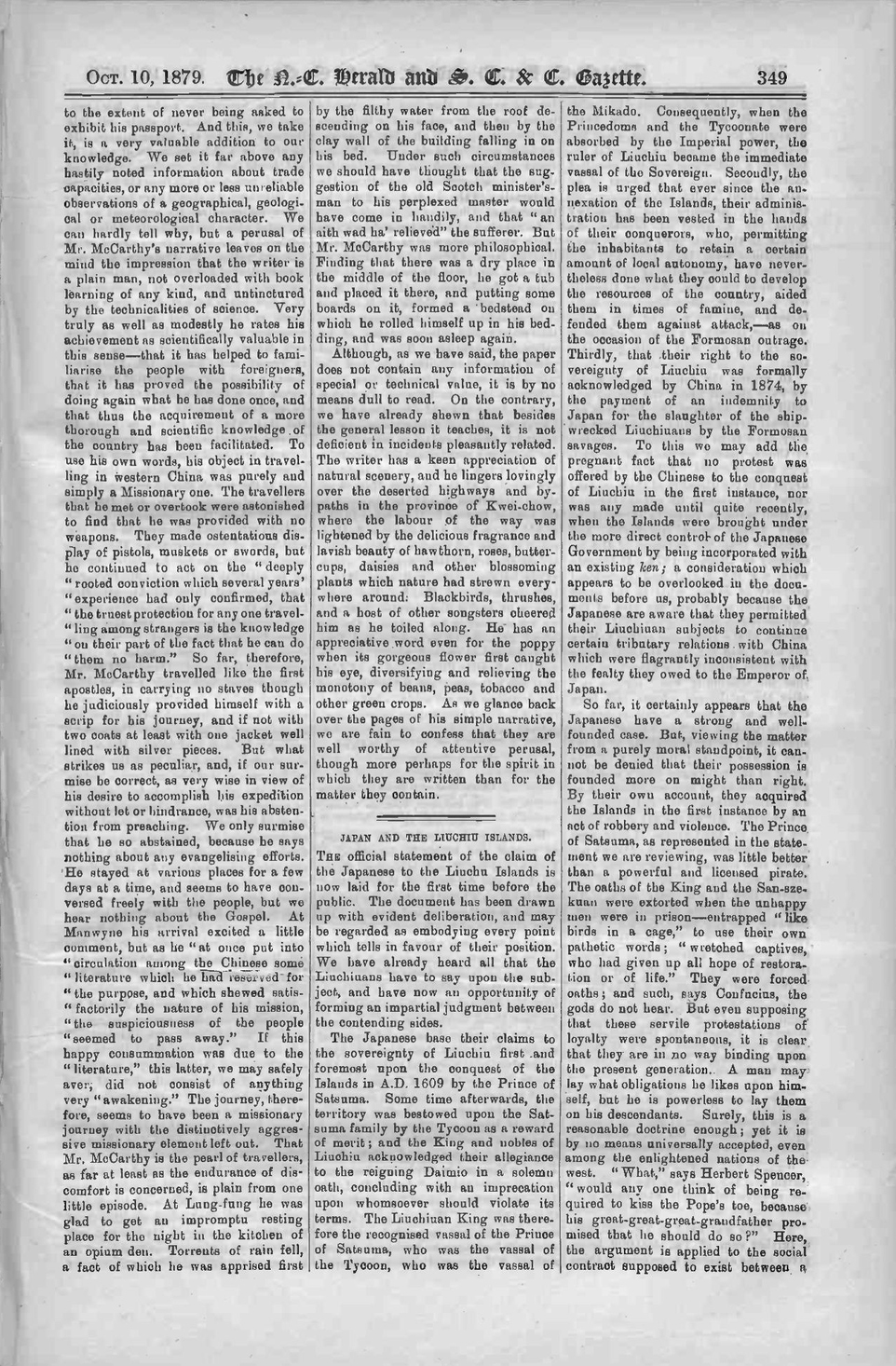
10 October 1879 edition of The North China Herald, reporting on Japan's "claim" to the Liuchiu Islands

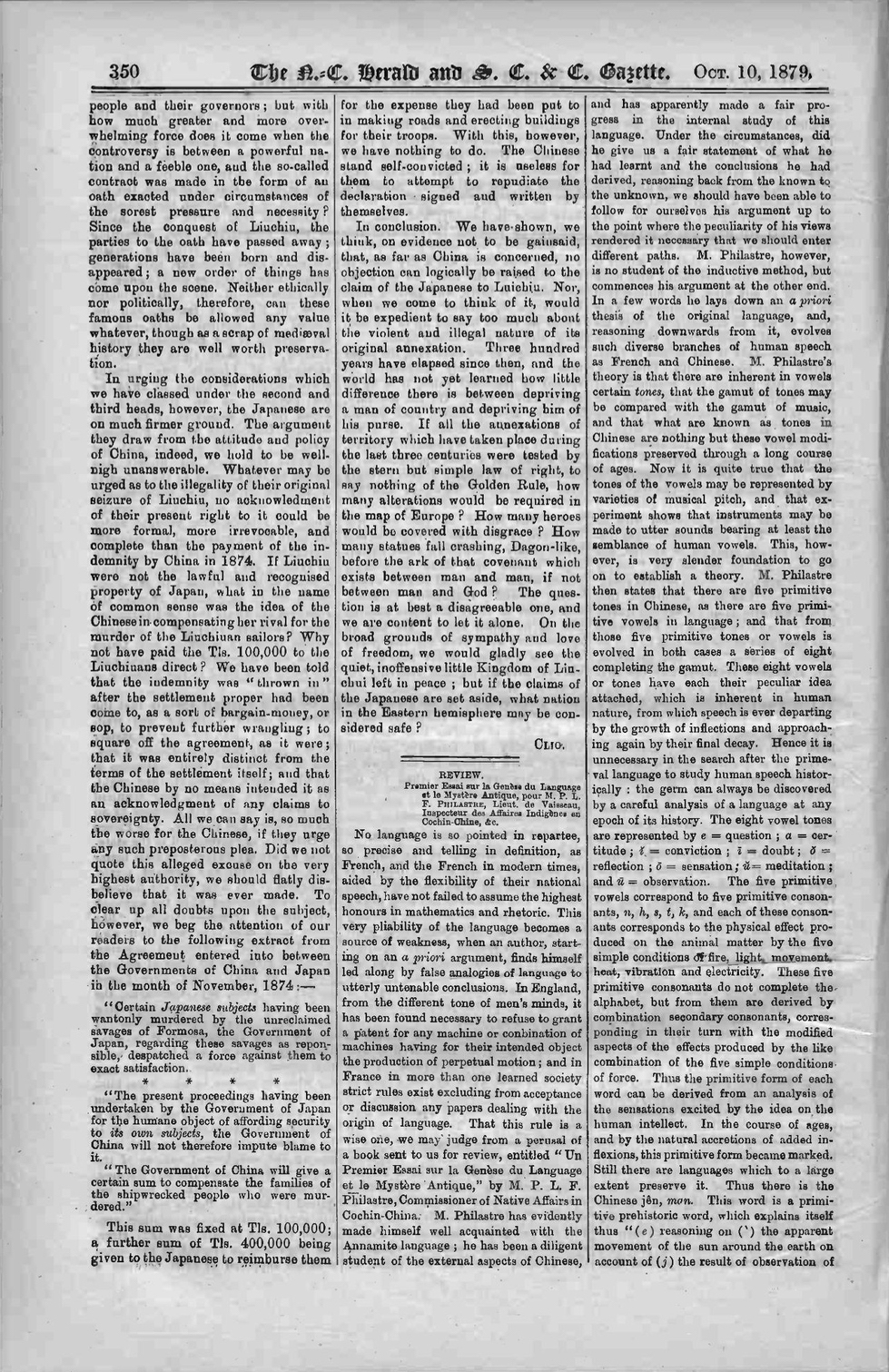
Continuation of the same, with a reference to the Mudan incident

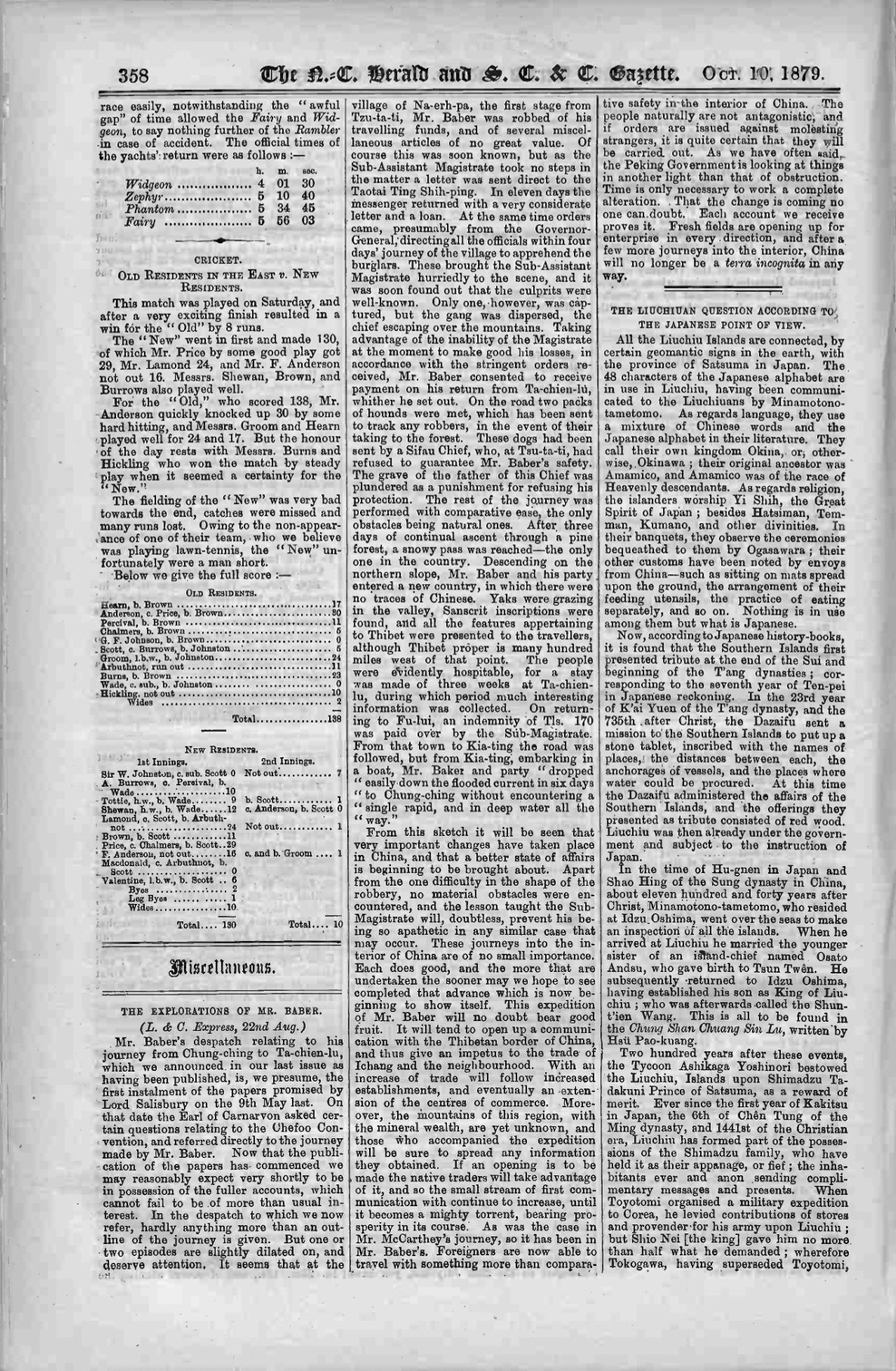
"The Liuchiuan Question According to the Japanese Point of View", in the same

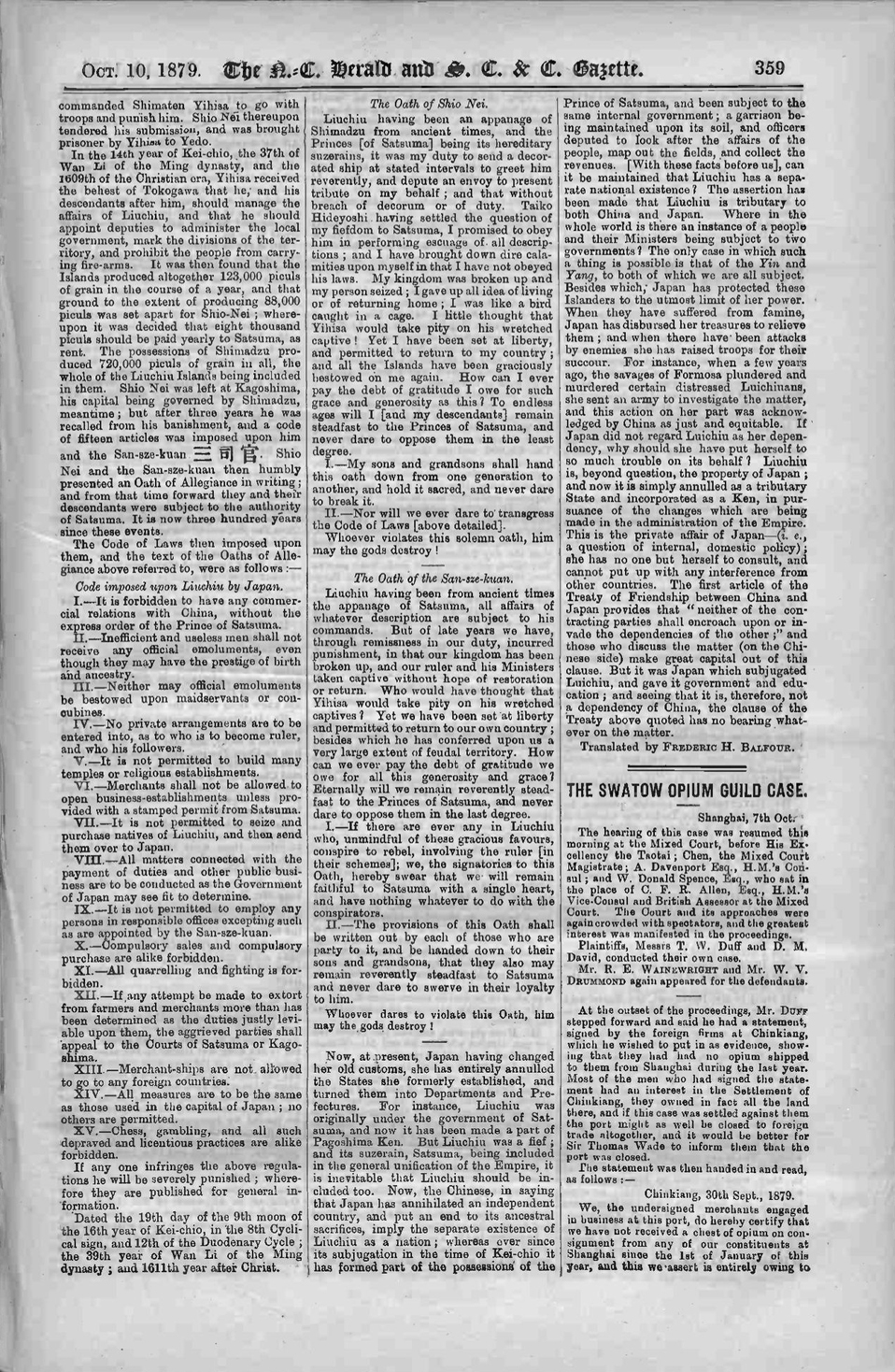
Continuation, with translations of the oaths of Shō Nei and the Sanshikan and of the Fifteen Injunctions (following the 1609 invasion)

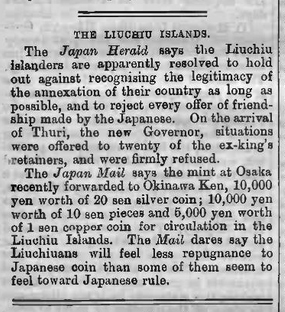
Update in The North China Herald one week later

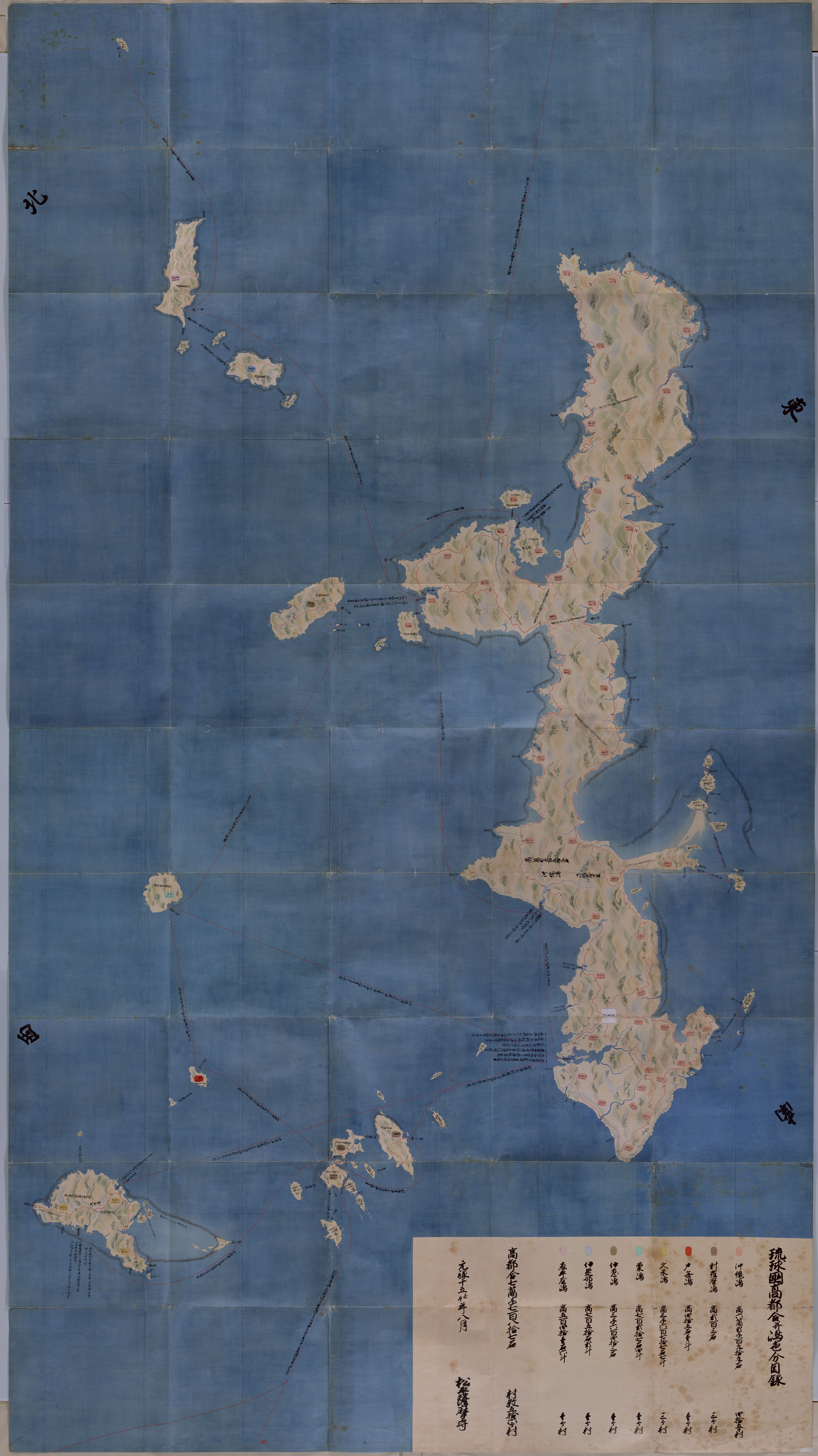
Okinawa Island from the Genroku Kuniezu (ICP) (National Archives of Japan)

== See also ==
- Colonisation of Hokkaido
- Hokkaidō Development Commission
- Okinawa Shrine
- Ryukyu independence movement
- Ryukyuan assimilation policies
- Sakishima Beacons
