= Nakijin Chōfu =

Ryukyuan prince

- Baron (see others)
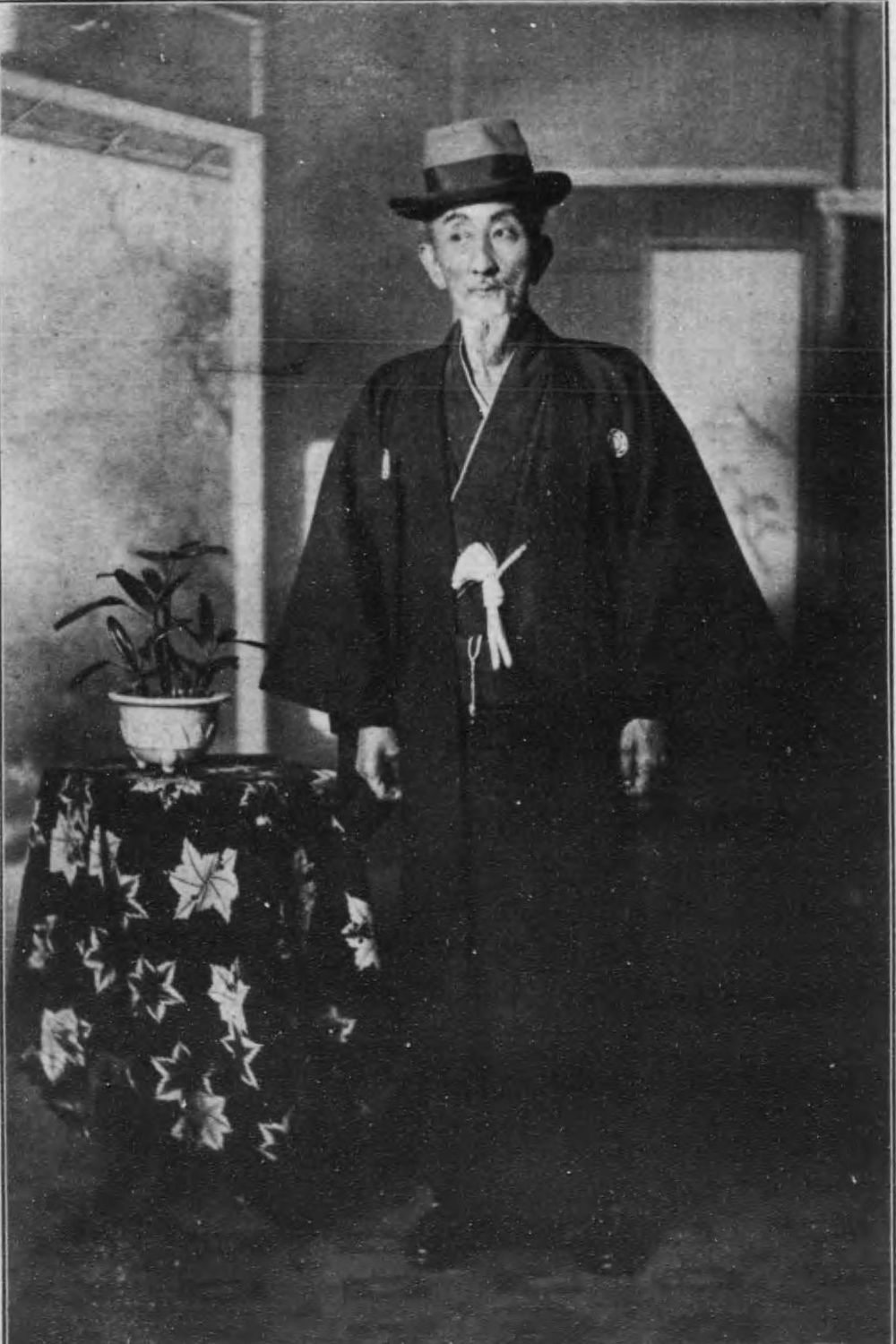
- Prince Nakijin

Regent of Ryukyu
- Regency: 1875 – 1879
- Monarch: Shō Tai

Head of Nakajin Udun
- Tenure: 1869 – 1 April 1915
- Predecessor: Cadet house established
- Successor: Wakugawa Chōwa
- Born: Prince Gushikawa; 15 July 1847; Shuri, Ryukyu Kingdom
- Died: 1 April 1915 (aged 67)
- House: Second Shō dynasty
- Father: Shō Iku

Prince Gushikawa, later known as Nakijin Wōji Chōfu (今帰仁 王子 朝敷; 15 July 1847 – 11 April 1915), also known by the Chinese-style name Shō Hitsu (尚 弼), was a Ryukyuan prince and founder of the Nakijin cadet branch as the son of Shō Iku, king of Ryukyu, and the regent for his older brother Shō Tai, the final king, from 1875 to 1879. He was created a baron (男爵, danshaku) in the kazoku (peerage) of the Japanese Empire following the annexation of Ryukyu into Okinawa Prefecture.

Sometimes he was called Prince Nakijin (今帰仁王子) for short.

Prince Nakijin was the third son of King Shō Iku, and he was also a younger brother of King Shō Tai.

In 1879, the Meiji Japanese government decided to abolish the Ryukyu Domain, and sent Matsuda Michiyuki to Shuri. At this time, Shō Tai claimed illness and let him to handle government affairs. Prince Nakijin tried to prevent Ryukyu from annexation by Japan but failed. After Ryukyu was annexed by Japan in 1879, Prince Nakijin was incorporated into the newly established kazoku peerage; and in 1890, he was granted the title of baron (男爵, danshaku).

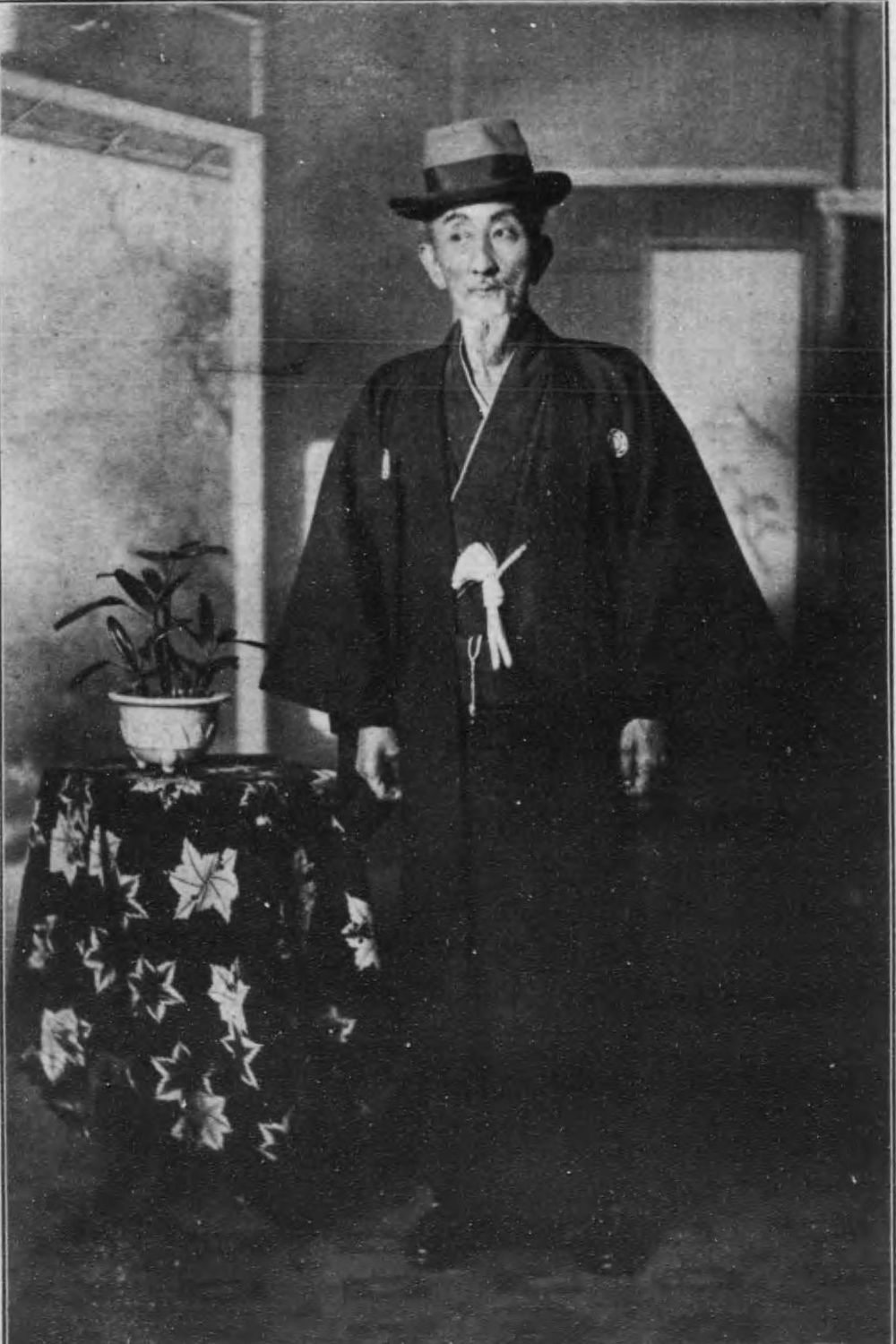
Nakijin Chōfu

Nakijin Chōfu
| title created | head of Nakijin Udun; 1869 - 1915 | Wakugawa Chōwa |
