= Ugui =

Ugui may refer to:

- Ugui (portrait), Ryukyuan royal posthumous portraits
- Ugui, another name for the big-scaled redfin
