= Ōta Chōfu =

Ryukyuan journalist (1865–1938)

- 太田 朝敷
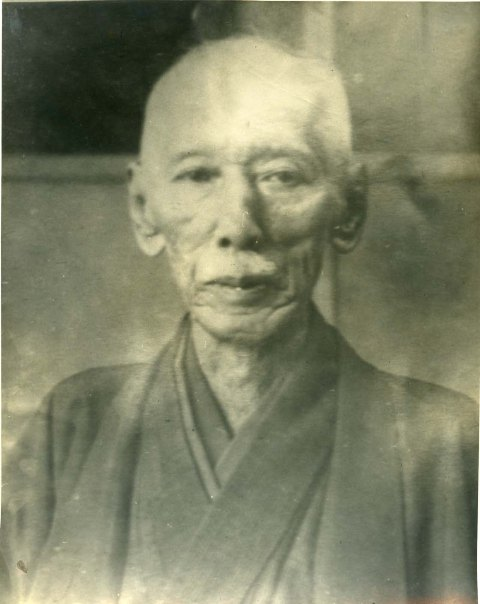

Mayor of Shuri
- In office 18 June 1929 – March 1934
- Preceded by: Kudaka Yūsuke
- Succeeded by: Takayasu Tamato

Personal details
- Born: 2 May 1865 Shuri, Okinawa, Ryukyu Kingdom
- Died: 25 November 1938 (aged 73)
- Education: Gakushuin University; Keio University

Ōta Chōfu (太田 朝敷; 8 April 1865 – 25 November 1938) was a prominent Ryukyuan journalist of the late 19th and early 20th centuries, famous for his involvement in the Kōdō-kai Movement, advocating the maintenance of hereditary rule of Okinawa under the heirs to the royal family of Ryūkyū.

== Life and career ==
Ōta was born in Shuri, and in 1882 became one of the first Okinawan students in the Meiji period to be awarded a scholarship to study in Tokyo. After studying at Gakushūin and Keiō Universities, he returned to Okinawa in 1893, and helped found the Ryūkyū Shimpō, the first newspaper in Okinawa.

Following the abolition of the Ryūkyū Kingdom and annexation of the islands by Japan as Okinawa Prefecture, politics and economics in Okinawa quickly came to be dominated by Japanese from the other prefectures. Many government bureaucrats, including Chōfu's father, engaged in peaceful protest, simply ceasing to work and refusing to aid the new officials in taking over responsibilities and activities. Ōta Chōfu also watched as native Okinawan merchants began to be pushed out by merchants from other cities who began to exert a monopolistic influence over the marketplace. He notes, in his writings, how a considerable amount of funding flowed into Hokkaidō, also recently formally annexed by Imperial Japan, and that many public works projects, the building of infrastructure, etc. were undertaken there, while Okinawa received little funding or infrastructure construction from the central government at this time. While Hokkaidō had considerable natural resources and the Ainu living there posed little political opposition, Okinawa had little natural resources, and "a large population divided and uncertain in its political and cultural loyalties".

During the Sino-Japanese War, Ōta was a member of the pro-Japanese Kaika-tō ("Enlightenment Party"), and was in his journalism, very critical of the pro-Chinese Ganko-tō ("Stubborn Party") within Okinawa. Ōta also helped found the Kōdō-kai, a group devoted to protesting for continued native Okinawan, not Japanese, leadership of Okinawa; the group in particular sought to see the former king of Ryūkyū, Shō Tai, instated as governor of the prefecture, and to see the position pass down through his lineage, as the throne would have. As editor-in-chief, Ōta also led the paper in opposing the Freedom and People's Rights Movement led in Okinawa by, among others, his former fellow scholarship student, Jahana Noboru.

In his journalism, Ōta reported and commented on a wide variety of subjects, including the state of education in Okinawa and economic problems. Beginning around 1903, he promoted the establishment of agencies in Osaka and elsewhere, including a Sugar Dealers' Association, aimed at helping Okinawans enter the otherwise Japanese-dominated markets.

He would later go on to serve as Okinawan representative in the prefectural assembly, and as mayor of Shuri (beginning in 1931), but remained a journalist throughout his life. After leaving the Ryūkyū Shimpō for a time, he was invited back in 1930 to serve as company president. He also wrote three books, including "Fifty Years of Administration in Okinawa Prefecture (沖縄県政五十年, Okinawa-ken sei gojūnen).
