= Shō Jun =

Shō Jun may refer to:

- Shō Jun (1660–1707) (尚 純), son of King Shō Tei of the Ryūkyū Kingdom
- Shō Jun (1873–1945) (尚 順), son of King Shō Tai of the Ryūkyū Kingdom
