= Mudan incident =

Massacre of Ryukyuan sailors in Qing-era Taiwan

Coordinates: 22°09′07″N 120°46′51″E

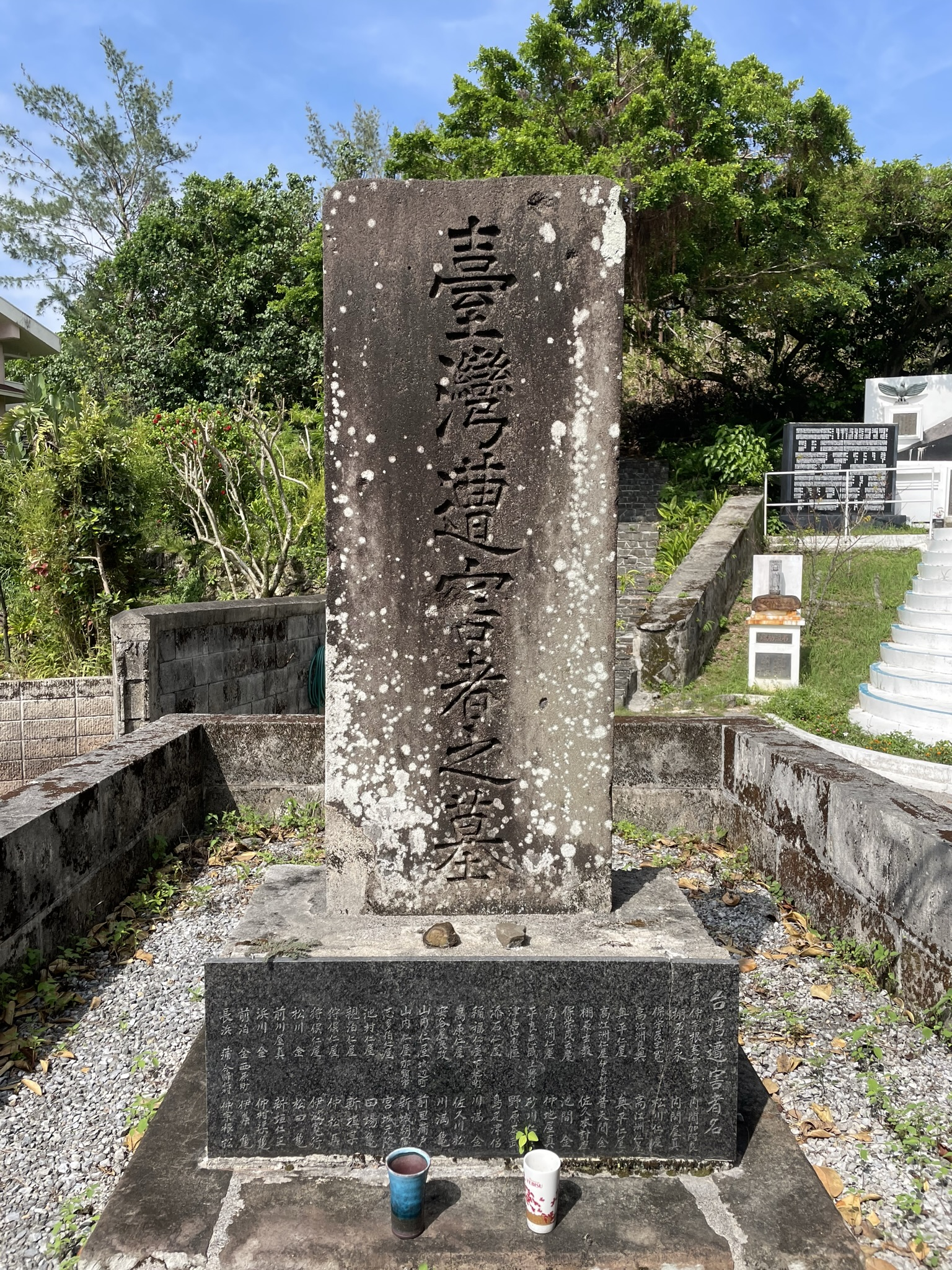
- Victims Tomb at Gokokuji Temple, Naha City. Okinawa Prefecture
- Location: Taiwan Prefecture, Fujian Province, Qing China
- Date: December 1871
- Attack type: Massacre
- Deaths: 54
- Victims: 54 Ryukyuan sailors
- Perpetrator: Paiwan Formosans

The Mudan incident of 1871 (Chinese: 八瑤灣事件; Japanese: 宮古島島民遭難事件 or 琉球漂流民殺害事件) was the massacre of 54 Ryukyuan sailors in Qing-era Taiwan who wandered into the central part of Taiwan after being shipwrecked off Taiwan's southeastern coast. Twelve survivors were rescued by local Han people and were later returned to Miyako Island in the Ryukyu Islands.

Because the Ryukyu Kingdom was a tributary state of Qing China as well as within the Japanese sphere of influence (to whom they also had a tributary relationship), the massacre was used as a pretext for Japan to invade southern Taiwan in 1874 to avenge "Japanese nationals" and subsequently annex the Ryukyu Kingdom in 1879.

== Incident ==
=== Shipwreck ===
On November 30, 1871, four Ryukyuan tributary ships left the capital of Shuri, on Okinawa island, homebound for Miyako Island and the Yaeyama islands (both in the southern part of the Ryukyu Kingdom). However, before reaching home the four ships were blown off course and hit by a typhoon on December 12, 1871. Of the two ships bound for Yaeyama, one was lost and the other landed on Taiwan's west coast and made it back home with the help of Qing officials. Of the two Miyakojima bound ships, one made it back to Miyako, the other shipwrecked off the coast of southeastern Taiwan near Padiyudr Bay (Chinese: 八瑤灣; pinyin: Bāyáowān). There were 69 passengers on the shipwrecked vessel, three of whom died trying to get to shore.

=== Massacre ===
On December 17, 1871, the remaining 66 Ryukyuan passengers managed to get onto shore and met two Chinese men who warned them against traveling inland for fear of encountering the Paiwan people, who the men reported were dangerous. According to the survivors, the Chinese robbed them and they decided to part ways.

On the morning of December 18, the Ryukyuans set out westward and thus encountered, presumably, the Paiwan people, who subsequently brought the Ryukyuans to Kuskus village (Chinese: 高士佛; pinyin: Gāoshìfó) and provided them with food, water, and housing for the evening. According to Kuskus local Valjeluk Mavalu, the water was a symbol of protection and friendship. The deposition claims they were robbed by their Kuskus hosts during the night. In the morning they were ordered to stay put while hunters left to search for game to provide a feast. Alarmed by the armed men and rumors of head hunting, the Ryukyuans departed while the hunting party was away. They found shelter in the home of a 73 year old Hakka trading-post serviceman, Deng Tianbao. The Paiwanese men found the Ryukyuans and dragged them out, slaughtering them, while others died in a fight or were caught trying to escape. Fifty-four were killed in the massacre while three tried to escape but were captured. Nine Ryukyuans hid in Deng's home. They moved to another Hakka settlement called Poliac (Chinese: 保力; pinyin: Bǎolì) where they found refuge with Deng's son-in-law, Yang Youwang. Yang arranged for the ransom of three men and sheltered the survivors for 40 days before sending them to Taiwan Prefecture (modern Tainan). The Ryukyuans were later taken to Fuzhou and then headed home for Naha in July 1872.

=== Causes ===
It is uncertain what caused the Paiwanese to murder the Ryukyuans. Some say the Ryukyuans did not understand Paiwanese guest etiquette, they ate and ran, or that their captors could not find ransom and therefore killed them. According to Lianes Punanang, a Mudan local, 66 men who could not understand the local languages entered Kuskus and began taking food and drink, which was a local symbol of protection and friendship, disregarding village boundaries. "In Paiwan tribal tradition, drinking water offered by a stranger means agreeing to peaceful engagement between equals. But the abrupt disappearance breached that agreement, turning guests into enemies." Efforts to aid the strangers with food and drink strained Kuskus resources. They were finally killed for their misdeeds. The shipwreck and murder of the sailors came to be known as the Mudan incident, although this remains a misnomer since the massacre did not take place in Mudan (known as Sinvaudjan by the local Paiwan people), but at Kuskus.

== Aftermath ==
The Mudan incident did not immediately cause any concern in Japan. A few officials knew of it by mid-1872 but it was not until April 1874 that it became an international concern. The repatriation procedure in 1872 was by the books and had been a regular affair for several centuries. From the 17th to 19th centuries, the Qing had settled 401 Ryukyuan shipwreck incidents both on the coast of mainland China and Taiwan. Shipwrecks during this time period were common. Between 1701 and 1876, 278 Ryukyuan ships shipwrecked along China's coast, more than Ryukyuan shipwrecks along Taiwan's coast. The Ryukyu Kingdom did not ask Japanese officials for help regarding the shipwreck. Instead its king, Shō Tai, sent a reward to Chinese officials in Fuzhou for the return of the 12 survivors.

In September 1872, Japan dethroned the king of Ryukyu. Despite the Ryukyu Kingdom having been an independent state at the time of the incident, the Japanese government eventually demanded that the Qing government be held responsible for the actions of the Paiwanese, which the Qing government dismissed, on the grounds that "civilization had not been extended to the region". In 1874, Japanese officials launched an invasion of southern Taiwan in the name of avenging the deaths of the 54 Ryukyuans.

== Legacy ==
=== Japan ===
According to Professor Matayoshi Seikiyo, the Mudan incident was historically important for two reasons: it resulted in the "verdict that the Ryukyu islands belonged to Japan," and it "served as a stepping stone for the later occupation and colonization of Taiwan by Japan."

The Japanese expedition army established a memorial tower in front of the tomb where Taiwanese rescuers had collected 44 skulls; 10 skulls could not be recovered. The skulls were transferred first to Nagasaki and then to Naha where they were buried before being later moved to Gokoku-ji (Okinawa) in the same city. In 1980, the tomb was re-established, and related people attended the ceremony from Miyako Island. The tombstone however has been criticized by Paiwan and Okinawans as having a Japan-centric view, as well as being anachronistic. In 1997, Fumio Miyakuni visited the related places and wrote a book.

=== Ryukyuans and Paiwanese ===
Most local, indigenous accounts of the Mudan Incident have been overshadowed by larger state narratives from Japan for two reasons: Ryukyuan languages do not have a writing system, and neither does Paiwanese. For this reason, oral tradition in the form of oral histories, testimonies, and depositions are utilized in both the Ryukyuan and Paiwan cases. According to Lianes Punanang: "On the whole, both my people and our Miyako counterparts were victims, but the sad thing is that their descendants have had to wait for 140 years to be able to talk about what reportedly happened." Reconciliation visits between descendants of the Miyako/ Ryukyuan sailors and Paiwan descendants have been taking place since 2004.

== See also ==
- Rover incident
