= Ugui (portrait) =

Posthumous portraits from the Ryukyu Kingdom

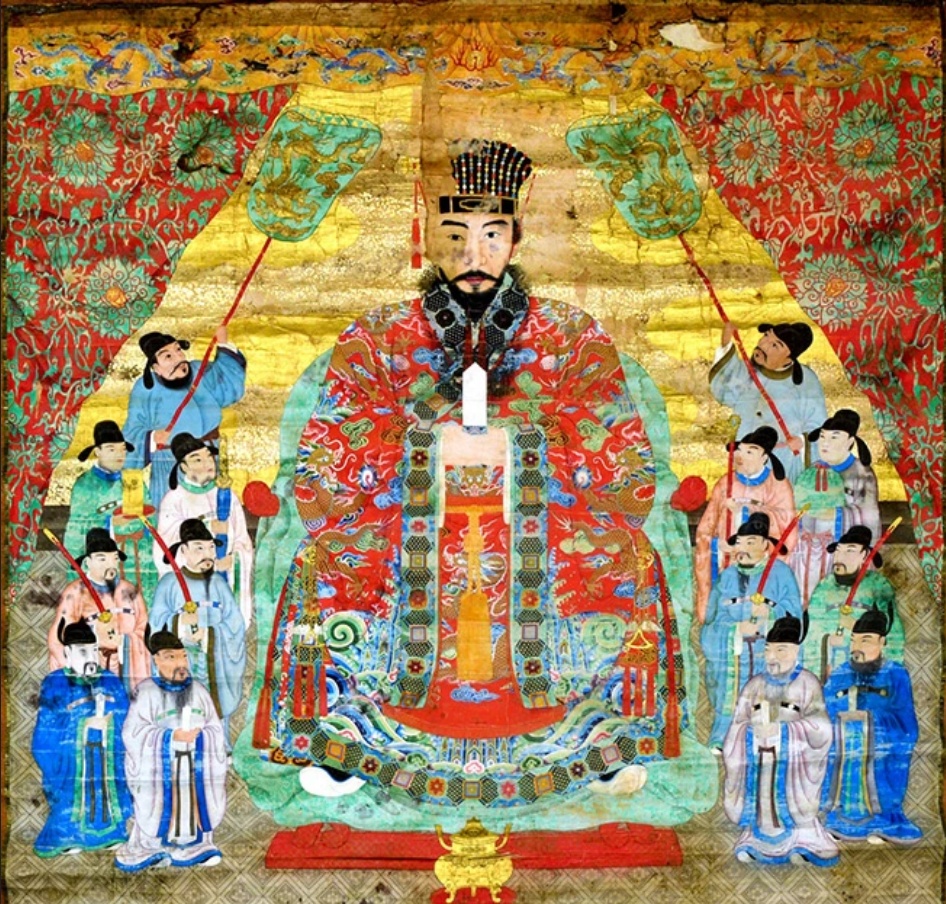
An Ugui of 18th king of Ryukyu Shō Iku.

Ugui (Okinawan: 御後絵) are posthumous portraits from the Ryukyu Kingdom (modern Okinawa Prefecture, Japan). Although it is unknown when the tradition of portraiture first began in the area, Ryukyu developed a unique style during the 15th-19th centuries.

Ugui were all painted in similar style; they all place the king in the center surrounded by high officials and other retainers, with the king much larger than the others to emphasize his power and authority. The king is shown with the royal regalia.

== History ==
It is unknown when the first ugui were created. Prior to the 18th century, the portraits were painted directly onto the walls of the Enkaku-ji Buddhist Temple in Shuri as murals but it is believed that owing to damage caused by fires to the temple, in 1717 the court artist to the Ryukyu Kingdom, Soki Yamaguchi, converted all the portraits to wall hung scrolls or kakejiku.

After the Ryukyu Kingdom was annexed by Japan in 1879, copies of the ugui were kept at Nakagusuku-udun Palace. Ten of them were photographed by Yoshitaro Kamakura in 1924 or 1925. In the same time, Majikina Ankō also came to Nakagusuku-udun to research these portraits.

During the 1945 Battle of Okinawa, eight employees of Nakagusuku-udun, including Maehira Bōkei (真栄平 房敬), put the ugui and other antiquities in boxes and hid them in a gutter on the palace grounds of Shuri Castle. When the battle came to an end and Shuri Castle was captured by the U.S. Army, Maehira came back to Nakagusuku-udun to find that the palace had burned to the ground and that all the boxes they had hidden were empty. Maehira thought that these ugui most likely survived and were carried off.

These lost antiquities included the royal crowns, Omoro Sōshi, ugui, and others. Omoro Sōshi was discovered in the United States a few years later, and returned to Okinawa in 1953; other antiquities were still not found. Since 2000, these lost 11 artifacts, including crowns, hibenfuku (皮弁服, ceremonial vestments worn by Ryukyuan kings), and ugui, were listed on the FBI National Stolen Art File.

In March 2024, the portraits of Shō Kei and Shō Iku, along with twenty other cultural artifacts, were discovered in the United States and returned to Okinawa Prefecture.
