= Uchimaudūn =

Sacred site for veneration of Ryūkyū kings

Uchima Udun
- 内間御殿 (Japanese)
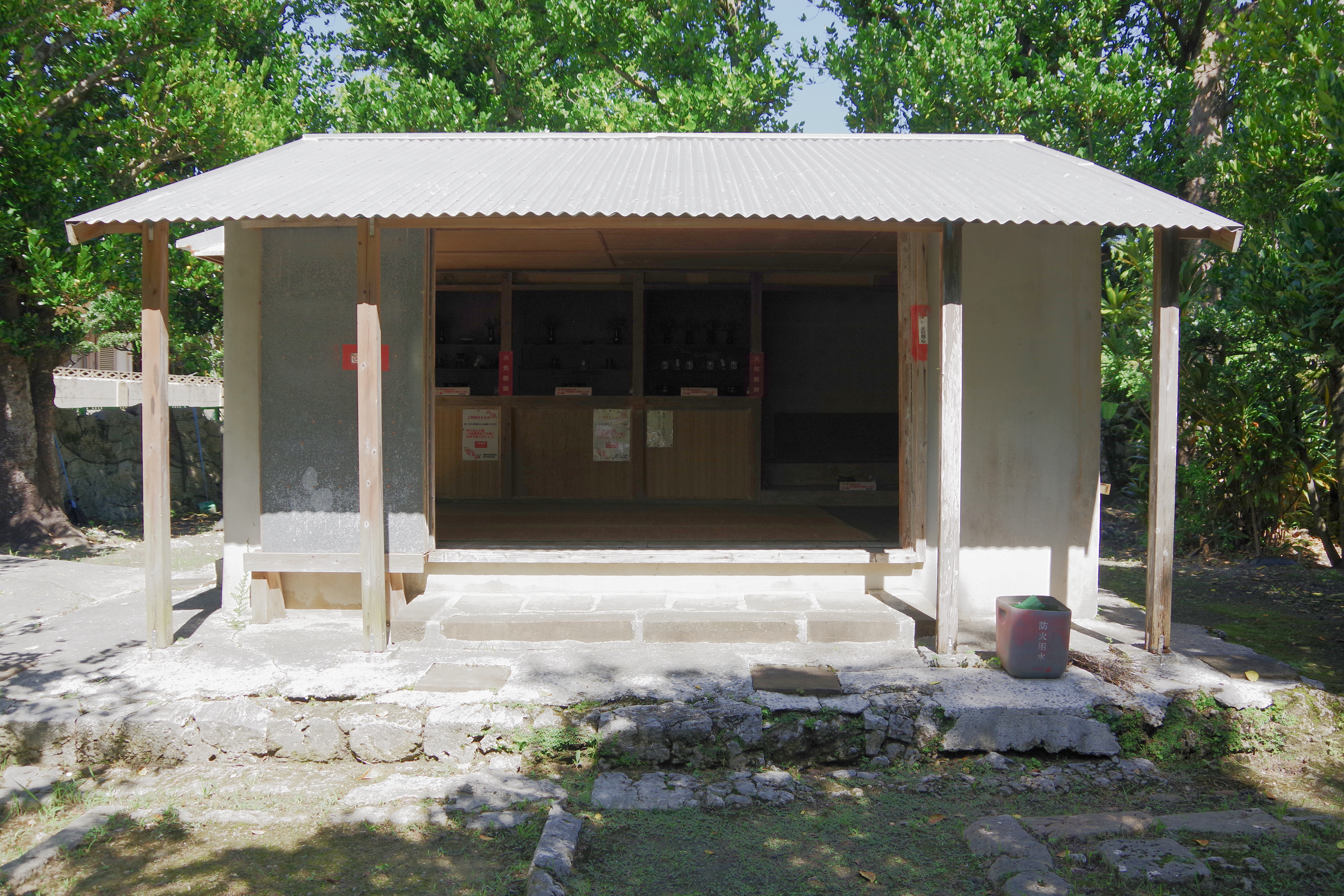
- Agari Udun at Uchima Udun

- Uchima Udun Uchimaudūn (Japan)
- Interactive map of Uchima Udun
- 26°13′39.07″N 127°46′04.68″E
- Location: Nishihara, Okinawa, Japan
- Region: Okinawa

Site notes
- Public access: Yes

Uchima Udun (Okinawan: 内間御殿/ウチマウドゥン) is a sacred site for veneration of the Ryūkyū kings, founded on the site of the residence of King Shō En, founder of the Second Shō Dynasty, located in the town of Nishihara, Okinawa Prefecture Japan. It was designated a National Historic Site of Japan in 2011.

== Overview ==
Located in the southern part of Okinawa Island, the Uchimaudūn is the site of the residence of King Shō En, the first king of the Second Shō Dynasty of the Ryūkyū Kingdom. It consists of the Iriudun on the north side and the Agariudun on the south side. It takes its name from his previous title Uchima Jitō which he held for 15 years here before ascending to the throne. After King Shō En's death, his former residence was designated a sacred site as a place associated with the Second Shō Dynasty, and a thatched shrine was constructed in 1666, 190 years after his death. A celadon pillow said to have been used by the king was enshrined as a sacred object. In 1689, the building was upgraded with a tiled roof with stone and the site began to be used as a place of worship for the royal court. However, in 1735 the treasure pillow was stolen, prompting the replacement of the bamboo fence with stone. The pillow was later discovered in a paddy field; however, it was stolen a second time in 1842 and never recovered. Since 1835, a small celadon dish has been enshrined in its place. In 1738. during the reign of King Shō Kei (reigned 1713-1751), a stone monument to the former king was erected, completing the site's status as a sacred site.

In 1706, residents of Nishihara District constructed a thatched shrine to the north of Uchima Palace, which came to be called "Iriudun." It was also reconstructed with a tile roof in 1737.

During the 1945 Battle of Okinawa, both palaces were burned down, leaving only some foundation stones and stone pillars. The monument to the former residence of the former king was damaged by artillery fire. The stone walls, made of Ryūkyū limestone in a lattice pattern, remain as they were at the time. In 1951, with donations from the Odonouchi clan and Okinawan emigrants to Hawaii, a tin-roof shed was erected to replace the Agariudun, and the Iriudun was replaced by a thatched shrine by the Irei clan, who had served as the palace's guardian. The Agariudun was renovated in 1960 and rebuilt in concrete in 1974.

The site is a 32-minute drive from Naha Airport.

== See also ==
- List of Historic Sites of Japan (Okinawa)
