= Shō Shō =

Japanese politician

Marquess Shō Shō
- 尚 昌
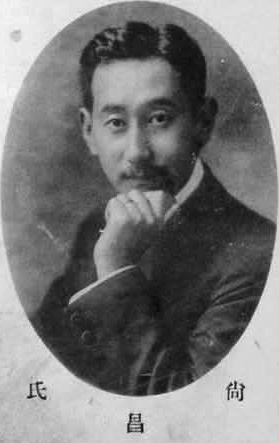
- Marquess Shō Shō

Member of the House of Peers
- In office 21 October 1920 – 19 June 1923 Hereditary peerage

Personal details
- Born: 17 September 1888 Shuri, Okinawa, Japan
- Died: 19 June 1923 (aged 34) Chiyoda, Tokyo, Japan
- Resting place: Kan'ei-ji, Tokyo
- Spouse: Momoko Ogasawara
- Children: Ii Fumiko; Hiroshi Shō; Sakai Sayako
- Parents: Shō Ten (father); Shōko, Nodake Aji-ganashi (mother)
- Relatives: Shō family

Shō Shō (尚昌, Shō Shō; 17 September 1888 – 19 June 1923), was the head of the Shō family, the former Ryukyuan royal family, and upon his father's death in 1920, he became head of the family and inherited the title of Marquess. Like most members of the kazoku system of peerage, and all heads of the Shō family since the abolition of the Ryukyu Kingdom, he lived in Tokyo for his whole life. He died in June 1923, and was succeeded by his son, Hiroshi Shō.

== Life ==
Shō Shō was the grandson of Shō Tai, the last king of the Ryūkyū Kingdom. He was born to Shō Ten and (Shoko) Nodake Aji-ganashi, the last Prince of Nakagusuku of the Ryukyu Kingdom. He went to Tokyo in 1896 and enrolled in Gakushuin Elementary School, and in 1909, he dropped out of Kyushu High School. At the recommendation of his father he attended Oxford University (accompanied by Masayoshi Kamiyama). After returning to Japan with his bachelor's degree in 1915, he became an archaeologist. In 1920, he became a Marquess upon the death of his father, and joined the Japanese House of Lords on 21 October. In mid-1923, during a trip to China, he developed appendicitis and died on 19 June in Tokyo. His tomb is located in Ueno, Taito-ward, in Tokyo.

== Family ==
He married Momoko Ogasawara (born 3 January 1896; died 11 February 1950; marriage date unknown), the daughter of Ogasawara Tadashi. On 18 September 1918, his eldest son Hiroshi Shō was born. His eldest daughter was called Fumiko (who later married Koi Ii, a former Mayor of Hikone), and a second daughter was called Kiyoko (who later married Tadahiro Sakai, the former Obama clan family head).

Titles of nobility
Preceded by Shō Ten	Marquess; 1920–1923	Succeeded by Hiroshi Shō
Titles in pretence
Preceded by Shō Ten	— TITULAR — Shō family head 1920–1923	Succeeded by Hiroshi Shō
