= Shō Jun (1873–1945) =

Japanese politician

Baron Shō Jun
- 尚 順
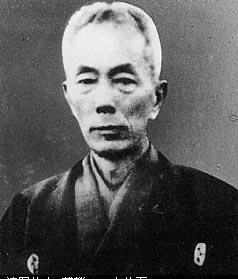

Member of the House of Peers
- In office 10 July 1904 – 19 June 1915 Elected by the Barons

Personal details
- Born: 2 May 1873 Shuri, Okinawa, Ryukyu Kingdom
- Died: 17 June 1945 (aged 72) Shuri, Okinawa, Japan
- Resting place: Tama Cemetery
- Parent: Shō Tai (father)
- Relatives: Shō family

Baron Shō Jun (尚 順; 2 May 1873 – 17 June 1945) was a prince of the Ryūkyū Kingdom, the fourth son of King Shō Tai, the last king of the kingdom. He played a major role in founding many 20th century institutions in Okinawa, including the Ryūkyū Shimpō newspaper, the Bank of Okinawa, the Taishō Gekijō theater, and a canning factory, and was a major figure in both the Japanese political and investment worlds of his time.

Following the abolition of the kingdom in 1879, Shō Jun, along with the rest of the Ryukyuan royal family, was made a baron in the new Japanese kazoku system of peerage. His father, King Shō Tai, was made marquis (侯爵, kōshaku); after his death in 1901, Shō Jun's eldest brother Shō Ten inherited the title. After the end of the formal mourning period, the Shō family gave up the trappings, rituals, and formal costume of Ryukyuan royalty and adopted the lifestyle and customs of the Japanese aristocracy.

Shō Jun was elected to the House of Peers of the Imperial Diet in 1904, and served two terms. After resigning his government post, he took over the administration of the Shō family's finances and other formal affairs.

In his later years, he managed the Tōbaru Plantation in Shuri, and created a tropical botanical garden on Gogayama in Nakijin. He became known as a man of culture and refinement in many fields of interest and as a calligrapher as well.

Shō Jun was killed in the Battle of Okinawa in 1945.
