= Ryūkyū Shimpō =

Regional newspaper in Okinawa, Japan

Ryūkyū Shimpō 琉球新報
- Type: Daily newspaper
- Format: Broadsheet
- Publisher: Ryūkyū Shinpōsha
- Founded: September 15, 1893
- Language: Japanese
- OCLC number: 72000851
- Website: ryukyushimpo.jp

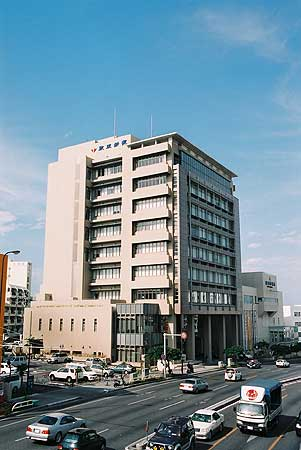
Ryukyu Shimpo Newspaper Building

The Ryūkyū Shinpō (Japanese: 琉球新報; lit. 'Ryukyu Newspaper') is a Japanese broadsheet newspaper published in Okinawa Prefecture. It was founded in 1893 by Shō Jun, a former prince of the Ryūkyū Kingdom, and was the first newspaper to be published in the prefecture.

Historian George H. Kerr says of the newspaper, upon its founding, that it "strengthened leadership and promoted the development of informed opinion on matters of public concern". It has also been described as speaking for the former ruling class of the kingdom. Editor-in-chief Ōta Chōfu, along with others from the newspaper, played a role in the Kōdō-kai Movement, arguing for leadership of the prefecture to remain hereditary within the Shō family, and opposing the Freedom and People's Rights Movement led in Okinawa by, among others, Jahana Noboru.

The Ryūkyū Shimpō company involved itself in development and modernization efforts in the island prefecture, spurring agricultural production and innovation by hosting competitions and exhibitions, and arranged in 1915 for the first demonstration of an airplane in Okinawa.

Originally published every other day, it became a daily newspaper in 1906. During World War II, as the result of the national government's Newspaper Unification Policy, the paper was combined with the Okinawa Asahi and Okinawa Daily News (Okinawa Nippō) into the Okinawa Shimpō, and did not resume publication under the name "Ryūkyū Shimpō" until after the end of the war.

Today, it has the largest print-run of newspapers in Okinawa with both morning and evening editions, and the newspaper company is connected to a number of other businesses, including Ryūkyū Shimpō Shipping, Ryūkyū Shimpō Development, and Weekly Lequio (週刊レキオ社, Shūkan Rekio sha)
