= Ogasawara Tadanobu =

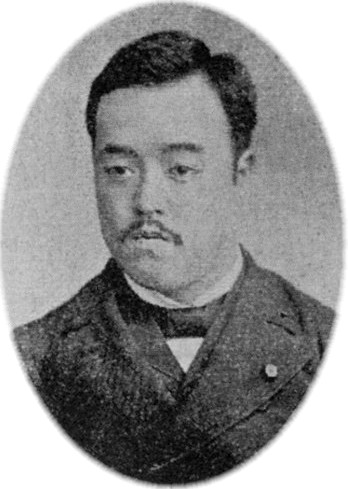

10th Daimyō of Kokura
- In office 1865–1871
- Preceded by: Ogasawara Tadayoshi
- Succeeded by: none

Personal details
- Born: March 8, 1862
- Died: February 6, 1897 (aged 34)

Count Ogasawara Tadanobu (小笠原 忠忱; March 8, 1862 – February 6, 1897) was a Japanese samurai daimyō of the late Edo period. He was the head of Kokura Domain.

== Ogasawara clan genealogy ==
Tadanobu was part of the senior branch of the Ogasawara clan.

Tadanobu's branch of the clan were daimyō at Kokura Domain (150,000 koku) in Buzen Province.

He was a (count (伯爵, hakushaku)) in the kazoku nobility system. This was because the head of this clan line and his heirs were ennobled in 1884.

== Events of Tadanobu's life ==
During Tadanobu's tenure as clan head, the Kokura domain took part in the shogunate's Chōshū Expeditions, and also destroyed Kokura Castle in 1866 during its retreat to Kawara. He was assisted in day-to-day affairs by his two karō, Komiya Minbu and Shimamura Shizuma. Komiya was the one who took charge of the burning of Kokura Castle and he subsequently committed seppuku upon orders by the Kokura domain.

For his deployment of troops on the Imperial side during the Boshin War of 1868, Tadanobu received a personal stipend of 5,000 koku from the court.

In the Meiji era, Tadanobu spent a few years studying in Britain, returning in 1878. He held junior 3rd court rank (jusanmi (従三位)).

== Ancestry ==
Ancestors of Ogasawara Tadanobu

16. Ogasawara Nagatame, 3rd Lord of Anji (1745-1782)
8. Ogasawara Nagayoshi, 4th Lord of Anji (1781-1825)
17. Ogasawara
4. Ogasawara Nagatake, 5th Lord of Anji (1809-1839)
18. Uemura Ienaga, 9th Lord of Takatori (1753-1828)
9. Uemura
19. Yae
2. Ogasawara Tadayoshi, 9th Lord of Kokura (1827-1865)
20. Matsudaira Mitsunori
10. Matsudaira Mitsuyuki, 6th Lord of Matsumoto (1769-1840)
21. Wada
5. Toda (1813-1858)
22. Matsudaira Mitsuyoshi, 5th Lord of Matsumoto (1754-1786)
11. Toda
23. Kajiwara
1. Count Ogasawara Tadanobu, 10th Lord of Kokura
24. Yanagisawa Nobutoki, 2nd Lord of Mikkaichi (1724-1792)
12. Yanagisawa Yasumitsu, 3rd Lord of Mikkaichi (1753-1817)
25. Sanada
6. Yanagisawa Satoaki, 6th Lord of Mikkaichi (1809-1843)
13. Kawakami
3. Yanagisawa
28. Hori Naokata, 7th Lord of Muramatsu (1767-1805)
14. Hori Naoyasu, 8th Lord of Muramatsu (1791-1819)
29. Kinoshita
7. Hori Yadaiko (1812-1870)
30. Inaba Hiromichi, 10th Lord of Usuki (1752-1818)
15. Inaba (d. 1847)
31. Tsuda

== See also ==
- (in Japanese) Biography of Tadanobu (September 28, 2007)

Preceded by Ogasawara Tadayoshi	10th Daimyō of Kokura (Ogasawara); 1865–1871	Succeeded by none
