= Shō Ten =

Japanese politician

Marquess Shō Ten
- 尚 典
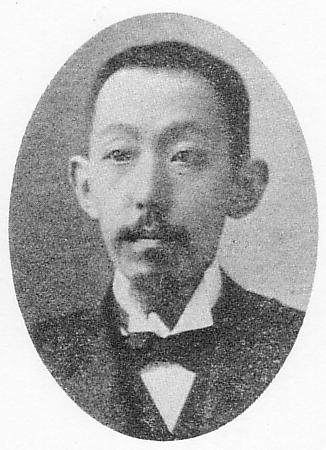
- Marquess Shō Ten

Crown Prince of Ryukyu
- In office 1868–1879
- Monarch: Shō Tai

Member of the House of Peers
- In office 31 August 1901 – 20 September 1920 Hereditary peerage

Personal details
- Born: Umitukugani (思徳金); 2 September 1864 Shuri, Ryukyu Kingdom
- Died: 20 September 1920 (aged 56) Shuri, Okinawa, Empire of Japan
- Resting place: Tamaudun
- Spouse(s): Shōko, Nodake Aji-ganashi
- Children: Nakijin Nobuko, Shō Shō, Shō Kei, Shō Dan, Shō Bu
- Parents: Shō Tai (father); Omomatsurugane, Sashiki Aji-ganashi (mother)
- Yamato name: Chōku (朝弘)
- Rank: Wōji

Marquess Shō Ten (尚典; 2 September 1864 – 20 September 1920) was the last crown prince of the Ryukyu Kingdom (中城王子, Nakagusuku Ōji; lit. Prince of Nakagusuku). He lost that title upon the abolition of the kingdom and the forced abdication of the king, his father, Shō Tai, in 1879, and later succeeded to the title of Marquess (侯爵, kōshaku) in the kazoku peerage following his father's death in 1901.

== Life ==
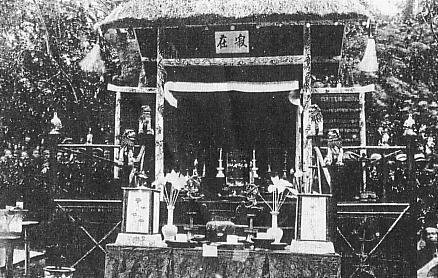
Funeral of Marquess Shō Ten

Shō Ten was born in Shuri and was from birth crown prince to the Ryukyu Kingdom. He underwent his coming-of-age ceremony in 1878 and was married the same year. In March 1879, his father Shō Tai formally abdicated upon the orders of the Meiji government, which abolished the kingdom, transforming Ryukyu domain into Okinawa Prefecture, with officials appointed from Tokyo to administer the islands. The former king was ordered to report to Tokyo, but feigning illness, he temporarily found shelter at his son's palace. Shō was then sent to Tokyo as a hostage and partial appeasement as Ryūkyūan officials searched for ways to delay the former king's departure.

Following his father's death and his succession as Marquess and head of the Shō family in 1901, Shō and his family gave up the trappings of traditional Ryukyuan royal court life, costume, court language, and ritual, and adopted those of the Japanese peerage. As Marquess, Shō held a hereditary seat in the House of Peers in the Imperial Diet. He was joined in representing Okinawa by a Japanese resident appointed to represent the prefecture's wealthiest taxpayers for the first time in 1918.

Shō died on 20 September 1920, in his mansion in Shuri and was entombed six days later in Tamaudun, the royal mausoleum near Shuri Castle, in accordance with traditional Ryukyuan royal funerary rites. He would be the last member of the Shō family to be honored in such a manner.

== Family ==
The family head was succeeded by his eldest son Shō Shō, then by Hiroshi Shō and the current incumbent, Mamoru Shō.

- Father: Shō Tai
- Mother: Omomatsurugane, Sashiki Aji-ganashi
- Wife: Shoko, Nodake Aji-ganashi
- Children:
  - Shō Shō (b.1888)
  - Nobuko (b. ?) engaged to Nakijin Chōei
  - Sho Kei (b.1889)
  - Sho Dan (b.1890)
  - Sho Bu (b.1899)

Titles of nobility
Preceded by Shō Tai	Marquess; 1901–1920	Succeeded by Shō Shō
Titles in pretence
Preceded by Shō Tai	— TITULAR — Shō family head 1901–1920	Succeeded by Shō Shō
