= Shō Iku =

Shō Iku 尚育
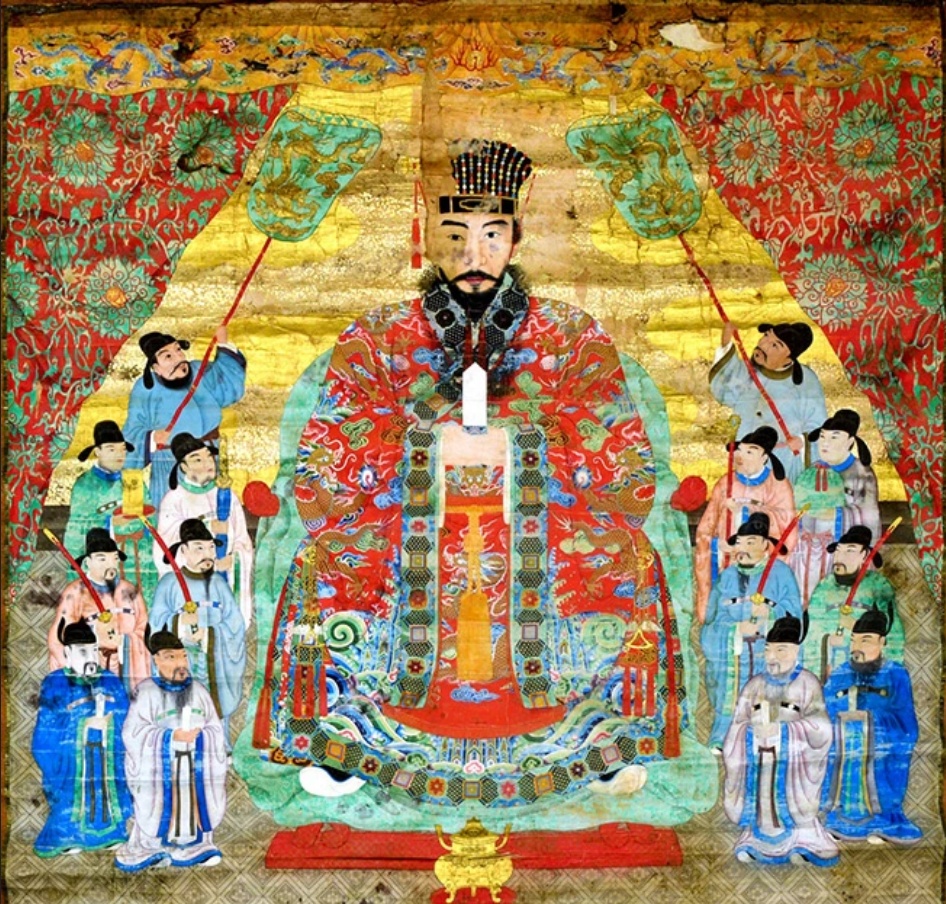
- Official royal portrait of Shō Iku, painted by Mō Chōki in 1852

King of Ryūkyū
- Reign: 1835–1847
- Predecessor: Shō Kō
- Successor: Shō Tai
- Born: Umitukugani (思徳金); 19 August 1813
- Died: 25 October 1847 (aged 34)
- Spouse: Sashiki Aji-ganashi
- Concubine: Mafee Aji
- Issue: See list: Shō Jun, Crown Prince Nagagusuku Shō Tai, Crown Prince Nagagusuku Shō Hitsu, Prince Nakijin Chōfu Manabetaru, Princess Kokuba Maushigane, Princess Suekichi Onmamatsugane, Princess Uema Princess Kanegusuku (Kōchi Chōjō's wife) Makadotaru, Princess Teruya
Names
- Shō Iku (尚育)
- Yamato name: Chōken (朝現)
- House: Second Shō dynasty
- Father: Shō Kō
- Mother: Gushikawa Aji-ganashi

Shō Iku (尚 育; 19 August 1813 – 25 October 1847) was a king of the Ryukyu Kingdom from 1835 to 1847.

== Life ==
He was the eldest son of Shō Kō. According to Chūzan Seifu, he was appointed regent in 1828, in place of his ailing father who was supposedly afflicted by a mental illness. Shō Kō died in 1834, and Shō Iku was installed as the king. Due to the economic distress at the time of his installation, Shō Iku forwent his investiture ceremony and distributed the funds to the districts as relief aid.

Shō Iku was a Confucian scholar, and had dedicated his life to education. But during his reign, the financial crisis grew more and more serious. When a French ship arrived in Naha in 1844, Ryukyu was forced to trade with France. It was the first contact with Western countries. Théodore-Augustin Forcade, a French priest sent by Paris Foreign Missions Society, came to Ryukyu to spread the Christian Gospel. Bernard Jean Bettelheim, a British Protestant missionary, also arrived in Ryukyu in 1846. Bettelheim established the first foreign hospital on the island at the Naminoue Gokoku-ji Temple.

The king died in 1847, and his second son Shō Tai succeeded him as the last king of the Ryukyu Kingdom.

Regnal titles
Preceded by Shō Kō	King of Ryūkyū; 1828–1847	Succeeded by Shō Tai
