= Matsuda Michiyuki =

Japanese bureaucrat and statesman

- 松田 道之
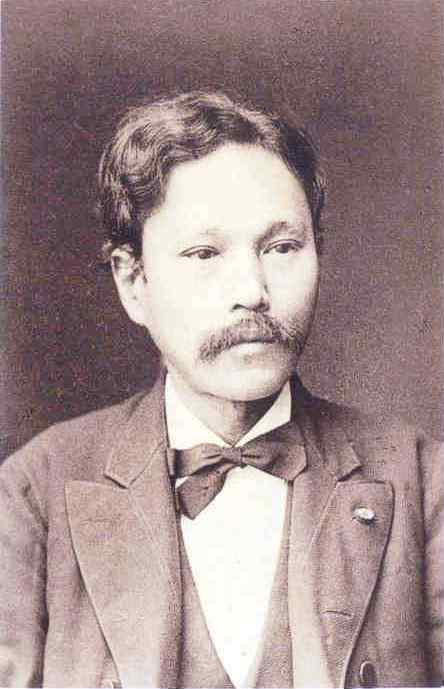

Governor of Tokyo
- In office 12 December 1879 – 6 July 1882
- Monarch: Meiji
- Preceded by: Kusumoto Masataka
- Succeeded by: Yoshikawa Akimasa

Governor of Shiga Prefecture
- In office 23 November 1871 – 23 March 1875
- Monarch: Meiji
- Preceded by: Office established
- Succeeded by: Koteda Yasusada

Personal details
- Born: 22 June 1839 Tottori Domain, Japan
- Died: 6 July 1882 (aged 43) Tokyo, Japan
- Resting place: Aoyama Cemetery

Matsuda Michiyuki (松田 道之; 22 June 1839 – 6 July 1882) was a Japanese bureaucrat and statesman, active in the Meiji period of Imperial Japan.

Matsuda was governor of Shiga Prefecture from 1871 to 1875, and governor of Tokyo from 1879 to 1882.

Matsuda was sent to Ryukyu in 1879. He abolished the Ryukyu Domain, and declared the creation of Okinawa Prefecture in the same year.

Political offices
Position established	Governor of Shiga Prefecture; 1872–1875	Succeeded by Koteda Yasusada
Preceded by Masataka Kusumoto	Governor of Tokyo; 1879–1882	Succeeded by Yoshikawa Akimasa
