= Shō Tai =

Last King of Ryukyu

Shō Tai 尚泰
- Marquess
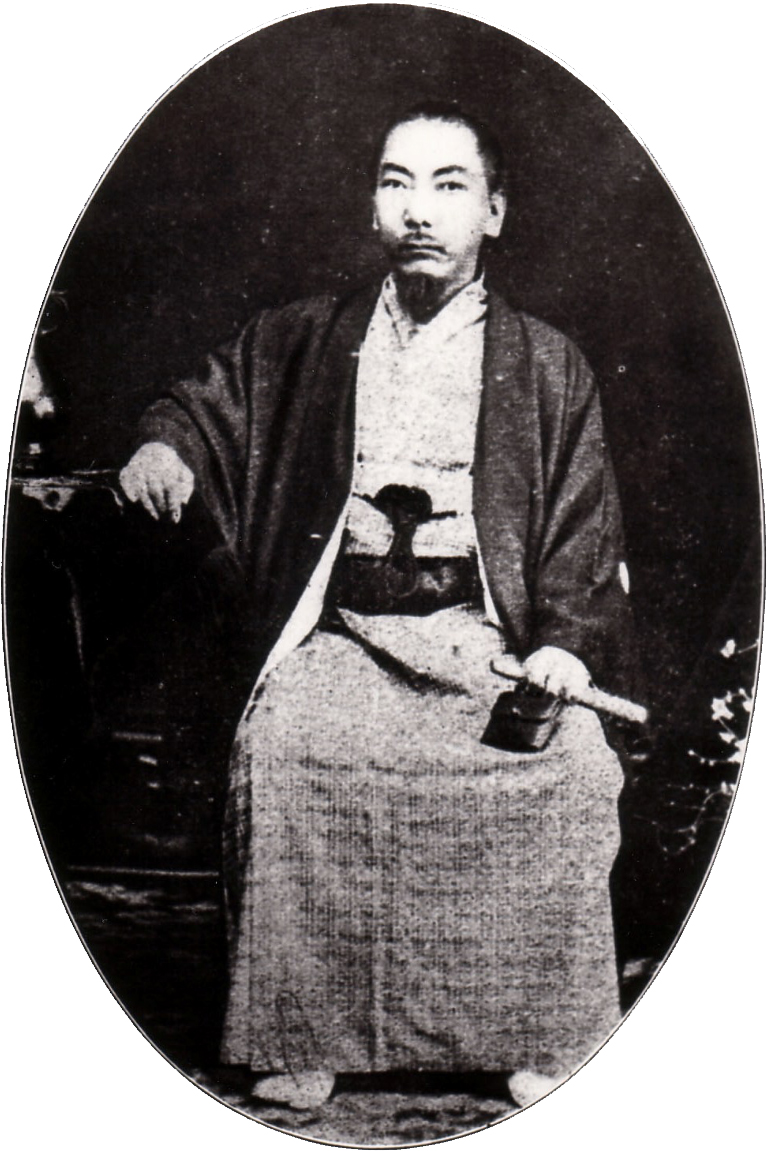
- King Shō Tai

King of Ryūkyū
- Reign: 8 June 1848 – 10 October 1872
- Investiture: 1866
- Predecessor: Shō Iku
- Successor: Himself as Domain King
- Regent: Nakijin Chōfu (1875–79)

Domain King of Ryukyu
- Reign: 10 October 1872 – 27 March 1879
- Predecessor: Himself as King of Ryukyu
- Successor: None (Annexation of Ryukyu Domain)

Member of the House of Peers
- In office: 29 November 1890 – 19 August 1901
- Monarch: Emperor Meiji
- Successor: Shō Ten
- Born: Umijirugani (思次良金); 3 August 1843; Shuri, Ryukyu Kingdom
- Died: 19 August 1901 (aged 58); Tokyo, Empire of Japan
- Burial: Tamaudun
- Spouse: Omomatsurugane (Okinawan: Umumachirugani), Sashiki Aji-ganashi
- Concubine: See list: Matsurugane, Matsukawa Aji Matsurugane, Hirara Aji Yamamoto Teu Kataya Tei Matsumoto Kō Tanaka Kō Kanda Natsu Tanaka Hana
- Issue: See list: Shō Ten, Crown Prince of Ryūkyū Shō In, Prince Ginowan Chōkō Prince Shō Kō Shō Jun, Prince Matsuyama Shō Shū, Prince Tamagusuku Shō Shū Matsurugane, Princess Tsukayama Manabetaru, Princess Amuro Princess Makishi Princess Kadekaru Shō Higari Shō Toki Masako (Kanna Kenwa's wife) Yaeko (Tō Issen's wife) Chiyoko Kimiko Sayoko Suzuko Sadako
Names
- Shō Tai (尚泰)
Era dates
- Daoguang Dōkō 道光; Xianfeng Seihō 咸豐; Tongzhi Dōchi 同治
- Okinawan pronunciation: Shō Tē (尚泰)
- Yamato name: Chōken (朝憲)
- House: Second Shō dynasty
- Father: Shō Iku
- Mother: Gentei, Sashiki Aji-ganashi

Shō Tai (尚 泰; 3 August 1843 – 19 August 1901) was the final King of Ryukyu, initially as hereditary king of the Ryukyu Kingdom from 8 June 1848 until 10 October 1872 and finally as the Japanese appointed Domain King by Emperor Meiji, ultimately leading to his deposition and relocation to Tokyo by the Meiji Government on 11 March 1879.

In May 1885, in compensation, he was made a Kōshaku (侯爵, marquess), the second tier of nobility in the kazoku peerage system. This entitled him to a hereditary seat in the House of Peers as well as a stipend from the government.

Overall, his reign saw the eradication of the dual-loyalty system of the supposedly independent Ryukyuan kingdom in favour of the Japanese rather than that of the Qing dynasty or the Satsuma Domain specifically, and the annexation of Ryukyu into Okinawa Prefecture. His time as sovereign featured greatly increased interactions with travelers from abroad, particularly from Europe and the United States.

The descendants of Shō continue to press their claim as the legitimate rulers of Okinawa.

== Early reign ==
Shō Tai became King of Ryukyu at the age of six and reigned for nearly 31 years. Developments surrounding pressures from Western powers to open the kingdom up to trade, formal relations, and the free coming and going and settlement of Westerners in the Ryukyu Islands dominated the first decade or two of his reign.

While Westerners had been coming to the Ryukyu Islands for several decades prior to Shō Tai's accession in 1848, and were almost always greeted warmly and provided with supplies, it was not until the 1850s that formal policies allowed and encouraged trade and relations with Europeans and Americans. Commodore Matthew C. Perry made port at Naha several times, both before and immediately after his famous landing at Uraga Harbor in 1853; the Commodore was never permitted to meet with the young King, despite his demands and his forced march to, and entry into, Shuri Castle. He did, however, meet with the royal regent and other high officials of the royal government, eventually yielding the Lew Chew Compact of 1854, along with other agreements, which could be said to parallel the Convention of Kanagawa signed that same year by representatives of the Tokugawa Shogunate, and to represent the "opening" of Ryukyu to trade and relations with the United States. Trade and relations with other Western powers soon followed, backed by Shimazu Nariakira, lord of Satsuma, who saw in the process opportunities to gain wealth and power. Relations with France were particularly strong; a French Mission was established in Naha, which in 1857 formally granted a number of items of field artillery to Shō Tai.

Nariakira died suddenly in 1858. He was succeeded by his half-brother Shimazu Hisamitsu, to whom Shō Tai was obliged to formally swear anew the oath of loyalty to the Shimazu clan that he and his ancestors had sworn since 1611. Hisamitsu reversed his half-brother's policies regarding Ryukyu's interactions with the West; Satsuma's radical opposition to foreign influence was a driving force in the events of the following decade in Japan.

In 1864, after Shō Tai had been on the throne for 16 years, the customary mission was sent to China to formally request investiture from the Chinese Imperial Court. Chinese representatives journeyed to Ryukyu two years later, formally granting on behalf of the Tongzhi Emperor recognition of Shō Tai's authority as king.

== Meiji Restoration ==
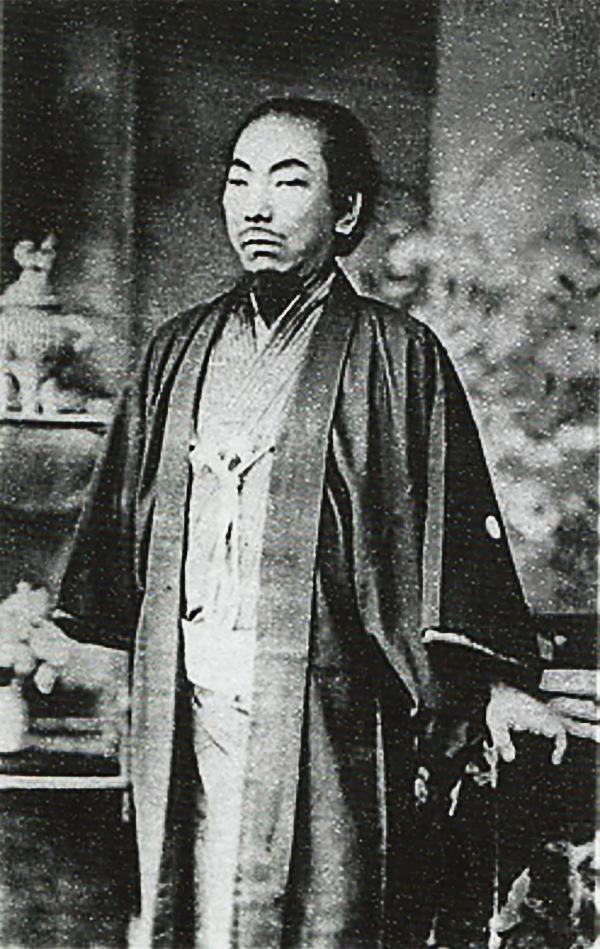
Shō Tai in the 19th century

Following the 1868 Meiji Restoration, and the abolition of the han system four years later, the relationship of the kingdom to the former Satsuma Domain (now Kagoshima Prefecture) and to the new Japanese central government at Tokyo was unclear and a subject of controversy between various factions in the central government. Shō Tai and his advisors or officials were never consulted for advice, consent, or opinions.

At the same time, in 1871, there occurred an incident in which a Ryukyuan ship wrecked on the Taiwanese coast and its crew was killed by the local natives. Kagoshima pressured Shō Tai to send a formal petition to Tokyo, asking for redress; the event would blossom into an international incident and eventually lead to the dispatch of a Japanese military expedition to Taiwan in 1874. To help resolve this problem and others concerning the relationship between Ryukyu and Japan, Shō Tai was advised to journey to Tokyo and formally pay his respects to Emperor Meiji, acknowledging at the same time his (and therefore his kingdom's) subordination to the Emperor of Japan. Shō Tai refused, and sent Prince Ie, his uncle, and Ginowan Ueekata, one of the kingdom's top ministers, in his place, claiming illness prevented him from making the journey himself. At Tokyo, the envoys were presented, on behalf of their King, with a proclamation declaring the kingdom to now be "Ryukyu Han", that is, a feudal domain under the Emperor of Japan in the manner of those abolished the previous year in the Japan mainland. This new arrangement meant freedom from subordination to Satsuma, but it also meant incorporation into Japan and subordination to the Imperial government in Tokyo.

A pair of missions led by Matsuda Michiyuki, Chief Secretary of the Home Ministry, in 1875 and 1879 were aimed at reorganizing the administrative structure of Ryukyu. Shō Tai and several of his chief ministers were granted formal ranks in the Japanese Imperial Court, and the King was ordered to appear in person in Tokyo; he again claimed illness. Prince Nakijin led a small group of officials to express the domain's gratitude in his place. However, the King's intransigence in refusing to come to Tokyo, and continued direct foreign relations with China was a matter of great concern to the new Meiji leadership, and Home Minister Itō Hirobumi drew up plans in 1878 to end the domain's autonomous and semi-ambiguous status.

== Abdication and exile ==
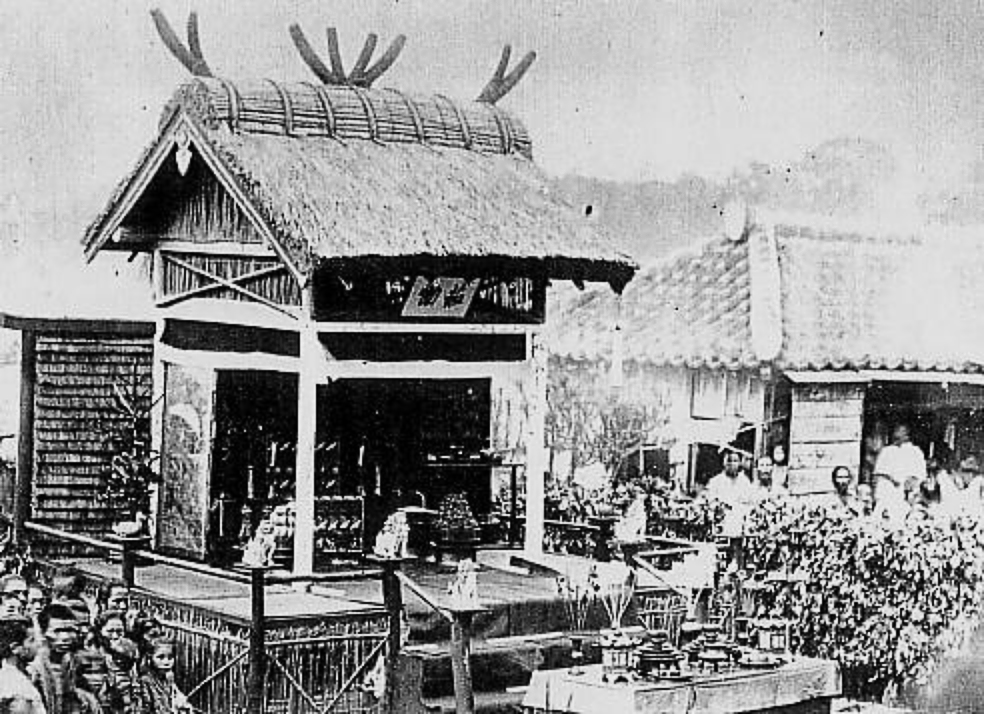
Funeral of Shō Tai

On 27 March 1879, Shō Tai formally abdicated upon the orders of Tokyo, which abolished Ryukyu han and created Okinawa Prefecture, with officials appointed from Tokyo to administer the islands. The former King was made to leave his palace, which he did on 30 March, and to move to Tokyo, which he did after some delays owing to supposed illness and inability to travel, leaving Okinawa finally on 27 May, and arriving in Yokohama on 8 June, whence he traveled with his entourage of 96 courtiers to Tokyo.

After meeting with Emperor Meiji on 17 June 1879, Shō Tai was incorporated into the newly established kazoku peerage, and on 2 May 1885, he was granted the title of Marquess (侯爵, kōshaku). Chinese Viceroy Li Hongzhang protested against the annexation of the former kingdom, and attempted to reopen the question of Ryukyu's sovereignty, by entering into discussions with former US president Ulysses S. Grant and officials in Tokyo, but without success.

Tokyo statesman Ōkubo Toshimichi suggested in 1875 that if Shō Tai were to be made hereditary governor of Okinawa, it would help quiet anti-Japanese elements in Okinawa and would help the prefecture better assimilate into the nation. A major Okinawan movement called the Kōdō-kai proposed the same some years later, but the idea was ultimately rejected by Tokyo as it could represent a failure of the current administration and could reignite issues over sovereignty of the islands.

Although now a Marquess, much of the same formalities and rituals appropriate for the Ryūkyūan King continued to be performed for Shō Tai. He moved in the elite circles of Tokyo, and became involved in business. Interests associated with the Shō family attempted to develop a copper mining operation on Okinawa in 1887, but with little success. His business managers, however, did succeed in establishing an Osaka-based company called "Maruichi Shōten", which dealt in native Okinawan products, selling them in Osaka and distributing them across the country. In the rest of his life he returned to Okinawa Prefecture only once, in 1884, to pay formal respects to his ancestors at Tamaudun, the royal mausoleum in Shuri.

Shō Tai died in 1901, at the age of 58, and was entombed in the royal mausoleum at Shuri, Tamaudun. His family observed traditional Ryukyuan mourning rituals for two years, after which they gave up traditional costume, rituals, court language, and ways of life, adopting those of the rest of the Japanese kazoku aristocracy.

== Notes ==
Regnal titles
Preceded by Shō Iku	King of Ryukyu; 1848–1879	Position abolished Ryukyu Kingdom annexed by the Empire of Japan
Titles of nobility
Title created	Marquess; 1884–1901	Succeeded by Shō Ten
Titles in pretence
Preceded by Shō Iku	— TITULAR — Shō family head 1848–1901	Succeeded by Shō Ten
