= Ryukyu Domain =

1872–1879 domain of the Japanese Empire

Ryūkyū Domain 琉球藩
- Domain of Japan; Tributary state of Qing China (until 1875)
- 1872–1879
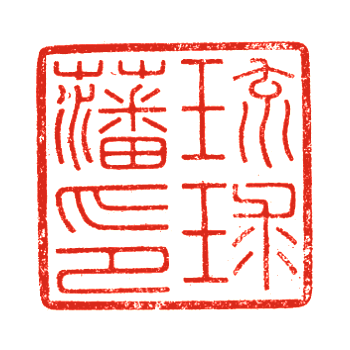
- Mon of the Second Shō family Official seal

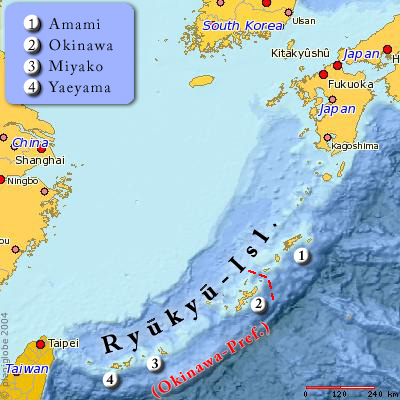
- Ryukyu Domain included the southern-half of the Ryukyu Islands.
- Capital: Shuri Castle
- Government
  - Type: Monarchy
- Domain King (藩王)
  - 1872–1879: Shō Tai
- Sanshikan
  - 1872–1879: Urasoe Chōshō
  - 1875–1879: Tomikawa Seikei
  - 1877–1879: Yonabaru Ryōketsu
- Historical era: Meiji period
  - Established: 1872
  - Disestablished: 1879
Preceded by	Succeeded by
Ryukyu Kingdom	Okinawa Prefecture
- Today part of: Okinawa Prefecture

The Ryukyu Domain (琉球藩, Ryūkyū han) was a short-lived domain of the Empire of Japan, lasting from 1872 to 1879, and simultaneously a tributary state of the Qing Empire, until 1875, before being fully incorporated into Japan as the current Okinawa Prefecture and other islands at the Pacific edge of the East China Sea.

When the domain was created in 1872, Japan's feudal han system had developed in unique ways. The domain was a political and economic abstraction based on periodic cadastral surveys and projected agricultural yields. In other words, the domain was defined in terms of kokudaka, not land area. This was different from the feudalism of the West.

== History ==
In 1609, the invasion of Ryukyu caused a change in the relationship of the island nation and Japan. After 1609, the Ryukyuan kings were forced to be vassals of the Shimazu clan of Satsuma and the islands were occasionally viewed as a province of Japan. At the same time, the kingdom and its rulers remained carefully independent, and also paid tribute to China.

The dual nature of the kingdom and its rulers was eliminated with the creation of the Ryukyu Domain which existed from 1872 through 1879. In 1872, the Emperor of Japan, after reaching a compromise with his advisors, created Shō Tai, who held the title of Ryukyu Kingdom's King (琉球国王 Ryūkyū-koku-ō), Domain King (琉球藩王 Ryūkyū-han-ō). As a result, the Ryukyu Kingdom was no longer a kingdom in its own right but henceforth recognized as a han, an administrative division of Japan. The Meiji Emperor's advisors advocated for the dissolution of the Ryukyuan monarchy entirely, just as had been done with the deposition of the daimyo's, however the Emperor felt a great sympathy for Shō Tai and, in a rare and reign defining moment, exerted his newly restored Imperial Authority to ensure the continuation of the monarchy. Ultimately, however, the Emperor was cognisant of the methodical and progressive dispossession by his government of Ryukyuan sovereignty in favour of Imperial rule.

The king and Ryukyuan aristocrats were granted lands and stipends of support in this period. The administration of the Ryukyus was established under the jurisdiction of the Foreign Ministry. After the Taiwan Expedition of 1874, Japan's role as the protector of the Ryukyuan people was acknowledged; but fiction of the Ryukyu Kingdom's independence was partially maintained until 1879. In 1875, administrative jurisdiction over the Ryukyus was transferred from the Foreign Ministry to the Home Ministry.

In 1879, Shō Tai was forced to abdicate and move to Tokyo, Ryukyu Domain was abolished, and Okinawa Prefecture was established. Shō Tai was given the title of Marquis and added to the list of Japan's peerage.

== Resistance against the decision ==
In 1876, Kōchi Chōjō gathered other Ryukyuans who, like himself, had fled for China, including Rin Seikō (林世功) and Sai Taitei (蔡大鼎). Together, they submitted numerous petitions to the Qing officials asking for help on behalf of the kingdom. Though there was little, if any, positive response for a long time, Chōjō and others refused to give up.

== See also ==
- History of the Ryukyu Islands
- Ryūkyū Disposition
