= Sanzan period =

Period in Okinawan history

The Sanzan period (三山時代, Sanzan jidai; lit. 'three mountain period') is a period in the history of the Okinawa Islands when three lines of kings, namely Sanhoku (山北; lit. 'north of the mountain (island)'), Chūzan (中山; lit. 'middle mountain (island)') and Sannan (山南; lit. 'south of the mountain (island)'), are said to have co-existed on Okinawa Island. It is said to have started during King Tamagusuku's reign (traditional dates: 1314–1336) and, according to Sai On's edition of the Chūzan Seifu (1725), ended in 1429 when Shō Hashi unified the island. Historical records of the period are fragmentary and mutually conflicting. Some even question the co-existence of the three polities.

== Contemporary sources ==
Okinawa does not have their own contemporary records of the Sanzan period. Contemporary sources are limited to Chinese and, to a far lesser extent, Korean diplomatic records. They are in a fragmentary fashion and probably overshadowed by diplomatic fictions. Since the Chinese sources simply record local rulers who contacted China, they do not rule out the possibility that some other local rulers co-existed without establishing diplomatic contacts. For this reason, Okinawa's real situation remains largely a mystery.

According to the Veritable Records of the Ming, the newly formed Ming dynasty sent an envoy to what it called the "State of Ryūkyū", among many other countries, in 1372 to start tributary relations. In response, a ruler who was referred to as Satto, King of Chūzan, sent his younger brother Taiki to pay tribute. In 1380, Shōsatto, King of Sannan, sent a mission to Ming China, which was followed by Hanishi, King of Sanhoku in 1383. The names of Sanhoku and Sannan are apparently Chūzan-centric. It is not clear who coined these names.

Ming China's perception of the co-existence of the three "kings" can be found in an article of 1383 of the Veritable Records, which was based on the report of a Ming envoy who visited Okinawa in 1382. The Ming considered that there were three rulers in the region who engaged in conflict. It recognized them as "kings" and called for peace.

As for the Kings of Sanhoku, the Veritable Records record the un-Okinawan-looking names of three kings, Hanishi, Min and Han'anchi, but make no mention of their blood relations. The last diplomatic contact of the King of Sanhoku was of 1416.

The records of the Kings of Sannann are more complicated. The diplomatic missions under the name of Shōsatto, King of Sannan, lasted from 1380 to 1396. An unusual characteristic of Sannan was that the "King's father's younger brother" (王叔) Ōeishi also sent envoys from 1388 to 1397. In 1403, Ōōso, who claimed to be Shōsatto's younger brother or cousin, reported Shōsatto's death in 1403 and was recognized as King of Sannan the next year. In 1415, Crown Prince Taromai reported that King Ōōso had been murdered by his "elder brother" Tafuchi. Taromai's blood relationship with Ōōso was not mentioned. As the King of Sannan, Taromai sent envoys from 1416 to 1429.

The Annals of the Joseon Dynasty of Korea records mysterious events about the King of Sannan. In 1394, Satto, King of Chūzan, requested Korea to return Shōsatto, Crown Prince of Sannan (山南王子承察度), who had supposedly fled to Korea. In 1398, Onsadō, King of Sannan (山南王温沙道), fled to Korea after reportedly being banished by the King of Chūzan. He died there in the same year. These records clearly contradict the Veritable Records, raising questions about the reliability of Okinawa's diplomatic correspondence to foreign countries.

The King of Chūzan sent envoys to China much more frequently than the Kings of Sanhoku and Sannan. The King of Chūzan paid tribute biennially from 1372 to 1382 and after that once or twice a year. Chūzan's missions were also unusual in that some of them were sent under the name of the crown prince although it should have been done by the king. In 1404, Crown Prince Bunei reported King Satto's death and was recognized as the next king. In 1407, Crown Prince Shishō's envoy reported his "father" Bunei's death to seek the approval of the succession to the throne. An article of 1425 in the Veritable Records states that Ming China let Crown Prince Shō Hashi succeed the late King Shishō.

Historians have noted suspicious patterns in the Sanzans' diplomatic missions. While Ming China bestowed vessels and their crews on the Kings of Chūzan and Sannan, the King of Sanhoku had no such record. This may explain why the King of Sanhoku's missions almost always coincided with Chūzan's even though they were supposedly in conflict. In addition, staffs in the missions were apparently shared. For example, Sangurumi (三吾良亹), who was sent to China by the King of Sannan in 1392, claimed to be a nephew (姪) of Shōsatto, King of Sannan. In Chūzan's missions, however, he appeared as a nephew (従子) of Satto, King of Chūzan, in 1403 and as a nephew (姪) of Bunei, King of Chūzan, in 1404. Even though historian Wada Hisanori regarded him as multiple persons with the same name, Wada acknowledged that the envoys and vessels sent by Taromai, King of Sannan, clearly overlapped with those of the King of Chūzan.

The Annals of the Joseon Dynasty states that in 1418, Katsuren, the second son of the King of Chūzan, called for trade with Korea and sent vessels that carried Chinese and Southeast Asian goods. Historians have no consensus on his true identity.

It is noted by historians that the Veritable Records make no mention of the supposed unification. The only thing that can be inferred from the records is that the Kings of Sanhoku and Sannan ceased to send diplomatic missions. The King of Chūzan retained the title of "King of Chūzan" even after he became the sole ruler of the State of Ryūkyū.

In 1416, the Ashikaga shōgun sent a letter in reply to the yo-no-nushi of the State of Ryūkyū (りうきう國のよのぬし). This rare record has been handed down only on the mainland Japanese side.

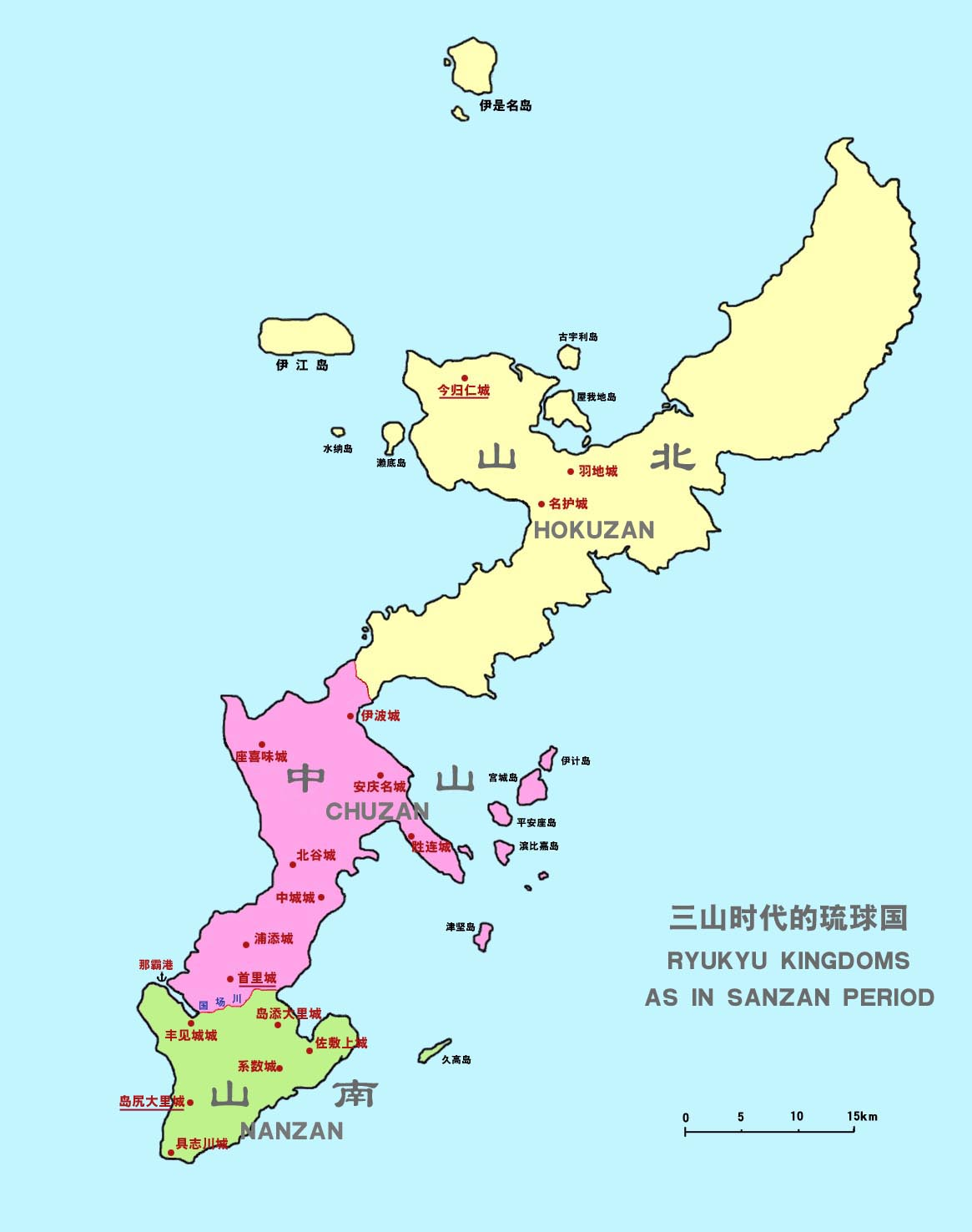
Map of Sanhoku (in yellow), Chūzan (in purple), and Sannan (in green), as recognized by Okinawans centuries later.

== Okinawa's later narratives ==
Okinawa's own narratives on the Sanzan period were recorded centuries later by Ryūkyū. Major history books include the Chūzan Seikan (1650), Sai Taku's edition of the Chūzan Seifu (1701), Sai On's revised edition of the Chūzan Seifu (from 1724 onwards) and the Kyūyō (1745). They reflect Okinawa's historical tradition to some degree. They are, however, desperate attempts to reconcile conflicting sources. Sai On, in particular, extensively rewrote his father's edition of the Chūzan Seifu using newly obtained Chinese sources. As a result, he damaged its historical value, from modern historians' perspective. Additionally, the Omoro Sōshi (1623) is helpful in understanding Okinawa's own world-view although it is a compilation of poems and by no means a history book.

The Chūzan Seikan and Sai Taku's edition of the Chūzan Seifu follow Chinese sources in that they refer to the supposed polities as Sanhoku (山北; lit. north of the mountain), Chūzan and Sannan (山南; lit. south of the mountain). For some unknown reason, however, Sai On changed the names of Sanhoku and Sannan to Hokuzan (北山) and Nanzan (南山) respectively. A world view presented in the Omoro Sōshi is strikingly different from that of the history books. The perception that Okinawa was divided into three polities is absent from the poem anthology. It never uses the terms of Sanzan, Sanhoku, Chūzan or Sannan. The King of Sanhoku is referred to as Aji of Nakijin. The supposed King of Sannan is Aji of Ōzato. Alternatively, he is referred to as Shimo no yo-no-nushi (下の世の主). They are no different from other regional rulers.

According to Ryūkyū's official history books, King Tamagusuku, who had maintained a unified polity, lost the support of local rulers. People in the south followed the Aji of Ōzato while the northern region was controlled by the Aji of Nakijin. In other words, these books identify the Aji of Nakijin as the King of Sanhoku and the Aji of Ōzato as the King of Sannan. Most modern historians question this alleged split because they do not support the existence of a unified polity on Okinawa before the "reunification" in the 15th century.

No personal names were recorded for the Aji of Nakijin in the Chūzan Seikan or Sai Taku's edition of Chūzan Seifu, except Hanishi, whose name was obviously taken from Chinese sources. It was not known to Ryūkyū how many rulers assumed the title. Sai On's edition of Chūzan Seifu adds two personal names, Min and Han'anchi, which were taken from a Chinese source, not from Okinawa's own.

Similarly, the Chūzan Seikan and Sai Taku's edition of Chūzan Seifu have no record of personal names of the Aji of Ōzato. The names of Ōōso and Taromai, added by Sai On to the Chūzan Seifu, are not based on Okinawa's own narrative. Another problem is about the identification of the place of Ōzato. There are two candidates for it: Shimasoe-Ōzato in modern-day Nanjō City and Shimajiri-Ōzato in modern-day Itoman City. In addition, the Omoro Sōshi divides southern Okinawa into three regions: the eastern region (covering Shimasoe-Ōzato), the central region and the western region (including Shimajiri-Ōzato). The Chūzan Seifu identify the Shimasoe-Ōzato Aji as the King of Sannan, which appears to reflect Okinawa's own narratives. However, both editions of the Chūzan Seifu identify Shimajiri-Ōzato as the capital of Sannan.

According to the Chūzan Seikan, the Aji of Nakijin's domain included Haneji, Nago, Kunigami, Kin, Ie and Iheya. The Aji of Ōzato controlled the 11 regions of Sashiki, Chinen, Tamagusuku, Gushikami, Kochinda, Shimajiri-Ōzato, Kyan, Mabuni, Makabe, Kanegusuku and Tomigusuku. The Chūzan King subjugated Naha, Tomari, Urasoe, Chatan, Nakagusuku, Goeku, Yomitanzan, Gushikawa, Katsuren and Shuri. Shuri is treated as the everlasting capital of Chūzan. However, it is clear from literary evidence and archaeological findings that Urasoe was the center of the most powerful polity on the island before the capital was moved to Shuri.

Tamagusuku, King of Chūzan, was succeeded by King Seii. After Seii's death, people deposed the crown prince and enthroned Satto, the ruler of Urasoe, in 1350. Although his existence was supported by contemporary sources, his life is colored by mythology: he was a son of a humble farmer and a swan maiden. During his reign, he started to pay tribute to Ming China. Also, he received tribute from the southern island groups of Miyako and Yaeyama for the first time in history. Satto was succeeded by his son Bunei in 1395.

Although the history books agree that Shō Hashi unified Okinawa, the accounts of the unification process contain non-negligible inconsistencies. The oldest Chūzan Seikan states that after Shō Hashi succeeded his father Shishō as Aji of Sashiki in 1402, he overthrew the King of Sannan and claimed the title. He then overthrew Bunei, King of Chūzan, in 1421 to become the King of Chūzan. He finally killed the King of Sanhoku in 1422. Sai Taku's edition of Chūzan Seifu generally follows the Chūzan Seikan. However, it dates Shō Hashi's conquest of Chūzan 16 years earlier than the Chūzan Seikan. It also claims that Shō Hashi installed his father Shishō as King of Chūzan instead of himself. Shō Hashi became the King of Chūzan only after Shishō's death in 1421. Sai On's edition of Chūzan Seifu is drastically different from these two books. It claims that Shō Hashi defeated the King of Chūzan and installed his father Shishō in 1406. He conquered the King of Sanhoku in 1416 and the King of Sannan in 1429.

The Chūzan Seikan seems to follow Okinawa's own tradition. Sai Taku "corrected" the Chūzan Seikan with Chinese records which stated that Shishō, Crown Prince of Chūzan, reported the death of "his father" Bunei. Sai On's drastic revision was also based on Chinese records. The last diplomatic contact of the King of Sannan was of 1429 while that of the King of Sanhoku was of 1416. From these records, Sai On naïvely inferred that these two kings ceased to exist immediately after the last contacts.

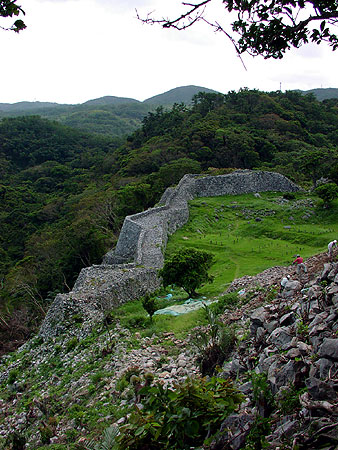
Nakijin Castle, identified as the King of Sanhoku's residence

== Interpretations ==
Modern historians have also struggled to resolve contradictions. Unlike Sai On, Wada Hisanori attached weight to the Chūzan Seifu. He identified Taromai as the eldest son of Shō Hashi and concluded that Taromai, King of Sannan, was a puppet of Chūzan. According to Wada, Shō Hashi overthrew the King of Sannan in 1403 and ascended to the throne. He overthrew Bunei, King of Chūzan, in 1405 and installed his father Shishō as King of Chūzan. He gave the title of King of Sannan to his son Taromai in 1415 to become the Crown Prince of Chūzan. He succeeded his father Shishō as King of Chūzan in 1422. After the death of Taromai around 1429, Shō Hashi formally abolished Sannan. The reason that Shō Hashi nominally maintained Sannan was that he wished to keep profitable Chinese trade conducted under the name of the King of Sannan.

Ikuta Shigeru presented an even more radical interpretation of the Sanzan period. He dismissed Okinawa's later narratives as mere legends. He argued that the King of Sannan was under the control of the King of Chūzan from the very beginning. Due to lack of sufficient evidence, he refrained from determining Sanhoku's relationship with Chūzan. He related these alleged kings to Ming China's haijin (sea ban) policy. Unlike the preceding Mongol Yuan Dynasty, the Ming Dynasty prohibited Chinese merchants from engaging in oversea trade. In order to maintain international trade that covers the vast area from Southeast Asia to Japan and Korea, they set up tribute-paying missions under the names of foreign kings. At their height, they used three dummy names. As Okinawa's importance in international trade decreased, the names of Sanhoku and Sannan ceased to be used.

== See also ==
- Gusuku Period
