= King of Sannan =

14th to 15th century title given to Okinawan kings

- 山南王

Details
- First monarch: unknown (traditional narrative)
- Last monarch: Taromai (traditional narrative)
- Formed: Sometime between 1314 and 1320 (traditional date)
- Abolished: 1429 (traditional date)
- Residence: Ōzato (Shimajiri-Ōzato) (traditional narrative)

King of Sannan (山南王, Sannan-ō) was a title given to a line of local rulers on Okinawa Island from the late 14th century to the early 15th century. Contemporary sources on the kings of Sannan are scarce and mutually conflicting. The narratives on the kings have gradually been expanded over time. In historiography, the term Sannan conventionally refers to a realm supposedly under their control. Sannan is also known as Nanzan (南山). The new term was coined in the 18th century by Sai On by flipping the two-character title.

== Contemporary sources ==
Contemporary Chinese sources claim that there were three "kings" in the State of Ryūkyū (i.e., Okinawa Island): the King of Chūzan, the King of Sannan, and the King of Sanhoku. In 1372, Satto, a ruler on Okinawa Island, greeted a Chinese envoy from the newly established Ming dynasty and was later given the title of King of Chūzan. He was followed by Shōsatto, King of Sannan, in 1380. In 1382, another Chinese envoy visited Okinawa and returned to China in the next year. According to an article of 1383 in the Chinese Veritable Records of the Ming, the envoy learned that there were three "kings" who were at war with each other. Accordingly, the Ming emperor issued an edict to the King of Sannan and the King of Sanhoku to end the conflict.

Thereafter, the kings of Sansan were primarily known by tributary missions sent under their names:

- Shōsatto (承察度): 1380, 1383, 1384, 1385, 1387, 1392, 1394, and 1396.
- Ōōso (汪応祖): 1404, 1405, 1405, 1406, 1407, 1408, 1410, 1412, 1413, and 1413.
- Taromai (他魯毎): 1416, 1417, 1424, 1429, and 1429.

In addition to the kings, some relatives appeared in Chinese sources as the senders of independent tributary missions, indicating some political anomalies:

- King's uncle Ōeishi (汪英紫) and King's younger brother Kanneiju (函寧寿): 1388
- King's uncle Ōeishi: 1391, 1393, 1395, 1396, and 1397
- King's younger brother Ōōso: 1403 and 104.
- Crown Prince Taromai: 1415.

The last reference to King Taromai was of 1429. Chinese had no information on when and how the king disappeared. Because the King of Chūzan continued tributary missions, the Chinese later speculated that the kings of Sannan and Sanhoku had been removed by the King of Chūzan.

In 1415, Taromai reported to China that King Ōōso had been killed by his elder brother Tabuchi (達勃期), who had in turn been killed by local chiefs, in favor of Crown Prince Taromai. This report was highly unusual because Okinawans routinely deceived the Chinese into thinking that the throne was normally succeeded from the father to the son. Historian Dana Masayuki raises the possibility that it was a cover story for Taromai's illegitimate seizure of power.

Even more puzzling is an article of 1394 in the Veritable Records of the Joseon Dynasty, according to which an envoy of Satto, King of Chūzan, arrived at Korea and requested the extradition of Shōsatto, Crown Prince of Sannan (山南王子承察度). It is not clear whether the "crown prince" in the Korean source was the same person as the "king" in the Chinese sources, who supposedly sent a tributary mission to China even after the alleged defection to Korea. Mysterious connections to Korea continued for a couple of years. In 1398, Onsadō, King of Sannan (山南王温沙道), was reportedly driven away by the King of Chūzan and exiled himself to Korea, where he died in the same year. No such event was recorded in Chinese sources.

The King of Sannan's suspicious relationship with the King of Chūzan was also indicated by tributary missions to China. In 1383, the tributary missions by the kings of Chūzan and Sannan arrived at China on the very same day. This episode indicates that they shared the same vessel because a long sea voyage made it difficult even for a single group of ships to arrive at China on the same day. Historians also noted unnatural overlaps of envoys supposedly sent by the kings of Chūzan and Sannan. Six envoys sent by the King of Sannan later represented the King of Chūzan while five switched from Chūzan to Sannan, among which two later became the envoys of the King of Chūzan again.

The most famous and suspicious among the envoys of the King of Sannan was Sangurumi (三吾良亹). In 1392, Sangurumi entered China's Imperial Academy as a nephew of Shōsatto, King of Sannan. Although he returned to Okinawa in 1396, he was allowed to re-enter the academy later in the same year. For some reason, he used Chūzan's ship to enter China. In 1403, he re-appeared as a relative (従子) of Satto, King of Chūzan. In the 11 missions from 1403 to 1416, he also styled himself as a nephew of King Bunei and a nephew of King Shishō. Historian Dana Masayuki noted that Sangurumi's transfer from Sannan to Chūzan coincided the political turmoil recorded by Korean sources.

Modern historians generally consider that it was overseas Chinese merchants who needed non-Chinese rulers, under whose names they joined authorized sea trade under the guise of tributary missions because Ming China exercised tight control over sea trade. Historian Ikuta Shigeru even speculated that the conflict between the three kings was a cover story created by Chinese merchants to increase the number of name-lenders. He claimed that the King of Sannan had been a puppet of the King of Chūzan from the very beginning. Historian Wada Hisanori criticized Ikuta's hypothesis but nevertheless speculated that Kings Ōōso and Taromai were puppets of Shō Hashi, who later unified Okinawa Island. Wada identifies Taromai as Shō Hashi's eldest son.

Although the name "Sannan" (south of the mountain (island)) indicates that they had a stronghold in the southern part of the island, the exact location was never recorded. Neither was the King of Sannan's perception of the apparently Chūzan-centric title.

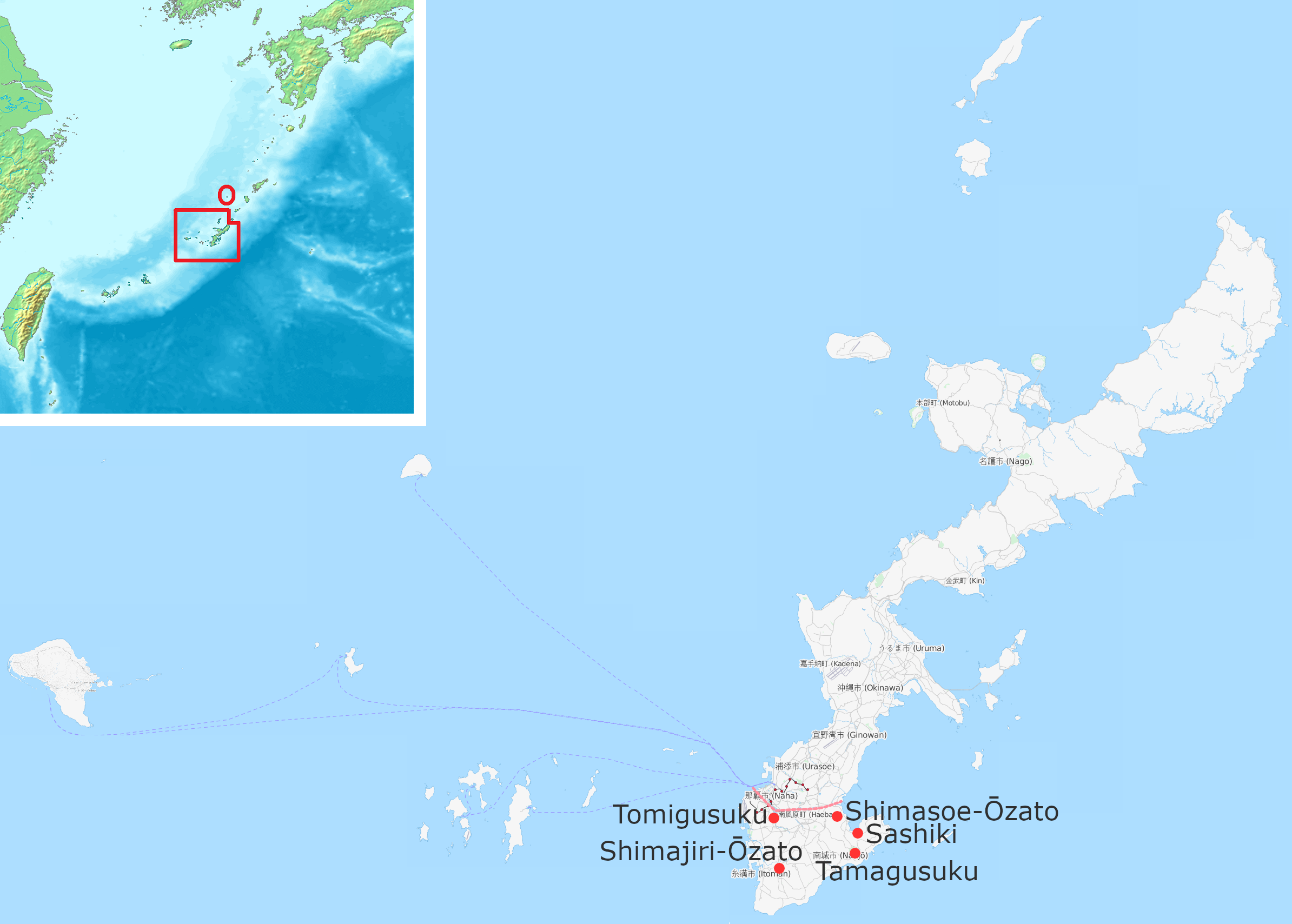
Sannan-related sites on Okinawa Island.

== Later Okinawan narratives ==
Haneji Chōshū's Chūzan Seikan (1650), the first official history book of the Ryūkyū Kingdom, recorded the Okinawan perception of the day, with a limited contamination of Chinese records. According to the Chūzan Seikan, Okinawa was split into three during the reign of King Tamagusuku (traditional dates: 1314–1337) and was later "re-unified" by King Shō Hashi in 1422. Modern historians question this narrative, favoring a progressive view of history, in which numerous chiefdoms were gradually unified into a kingdom.

The Chūzan Seikan identified the King of Sannan as Aji (local ruler) of Ōzato, who supposedly subjected to his rule Sashiki, Chinen, Tamagusuku, Gushikami, Kochinda, Shimajiri-Ōzato, Kyan, Mabuni, Makabe, Kanegusuku, and Tomigusuku. These place names as a whole roughly correspond to modern-day Shimajiri region. The notion of three powers appears to be deeply rooted in Okinawan society. However, it remains a matter of debate whether they corresponded to the later administrative divisions of Shimajiri (south), Nakagami (central), and Kunigami (north). Historian Ikemiya Masaharu pointed to the religiously oriented division of Okinawa, in which Shimajiri was not treated as a monolithic entity but was divided into the east and the west. The non-homogeneity of Shimajiri is also confirmed by archaeological findings. Based on material culture, Archaeologist Asato Susumu divided Shimajiri into five regions.

The Chūzan Seikan did not mention how many rulers had assumed the title of Aji of Ōzato, or King of Sannan. The sole reference to personal names was of Shōsatto, King of Sannan, who the Chūzan Seikan stated had sent a tributary mission along with the kings of Chūzan and Sanhoku in 1372. Although this statement contradicts contemporary Chinese sources, it was apparently based on Haneji Chōshū's limited access to diplomatic records.

The Chūzan Seikan narrates Shō Hashi's unification of Okinawa in a way drastically different from Sai On's edition of Chūzan Seifu (1725). Shō Hashi succeeded his father Shishō as Aji of Sashiki in 1402. After that, he took over the King of Sannan by force. The King of Sannan, identified as Shō Hashi, then started a war with Bunei, King of Chūzan, and forced him to surrender in 1421. After that, the King of Sannan became King of Chūzan. The King of Chūzan annihilated the King of Sanhoku in 1422, unifying the State of Ryūkyū (i.e., Okinawa Island). In 1423, Shō Hashi reported the unification to the Ming emperor, and Shishō was posthumously appointed as King of Chūzan.

Sai Taku's edition of the Chūzan Seifu (1701) generally followed the Chūzan Seikan, but added an episode about Shō Hashi: When Shō Hashi was an heir to the Aji of Sashiki, he exchanged his gold-painted folding screen with a lifeblood spring owned by the Aji of Shimajiri-Ōzato (i.e., King of Sannan). Thereafter, the Aji of Shimajiri-Ōzato lost support from the peasantry, leading to Shō Hashi's rise to power. Ethnologist Ōbayashi Taryō argued that this episode was part of Ryūkyū's tripartite ideology. According to his hypothesis, Sanhoku, Chūzan, and Sannan were mapped to military, sovereignty, and productivity, respectively. Shō Hashi's gold-painted folding screen can be seen as Sannan's regalia.

Sai On's edition of the Chūzan Seifu (1725) made significant changes to the narrative. Having access to Chinese diplomatic records, he added the records of tributary missions sent under the name of the King of Sannan. The last king was now identified as Taromai. More importantly, he dated the King of Sannan's downfall to 1429. Sai On naïvely inferred that the King of Sannan was removed immediately after the last tributary mission of 1429. This modification triggered a drastic reordering of events: Shō Hashi first overthrew Bunei, King of Chūzan, and installed his father Shishō in 1406. He then conquered the King of Sanhoku in 1416 and finally the King of Sannan in 1429.

== Location of Ōzato ==
The identification of the King of Sannan as the Aji of Ōzato appears to be deeply rooted in Okinawa's own narrative. However, it is not clear where Ōzato was, because there are two candidates in the Shimajiri region: Shimasoe-Ōzato in the east (part of modern-day Nanjō City) and Shimajiri-Ōzato in the west (part of modern-day Itoman City). Sometimes during the mid-17the century, while Shimajiri-Ōzato was renamed to Takamine while Shimasoe-Ōzato was shortened to Ōzato.

The Chūzan Seikan (1650) suggested that the Aji of Shimasoe-Ōzato had been the King of Sannan while Sai Taku's and Sai On's editions of Chūzan Seifu equated Shimajiri-Ōzato Castle with Nanzan Castle. Apparently, the older Chūzan Seikan reflected Okinawa's traditional narrative. Because Sashiki, Shō Hashi's stronghold, neighbored Shimasoe-Ōzato, his conquest must have started with the overthrow of the Aji of Shimasoe-Ōzato.

While Sai On drastically rewrote history, he somehow kept the episode of Shō Hashi's takeover of the Aji of Ōzato in his early years. To resolve the contradiction, Sai On re-identified the Aji of Ōzato in question as the Aji of Shimasoe-Ōzato while the King of Sannan, annihilated supposedly much later, was identified as the Aji of Shimajiri-Ōzato.

== See also ==
- Sanzan period
- Genealogy of the kings of Chūzan
