= Nanzan =

Kingdom controlling 14th century Okinawa

Coordinates: 26°07′N 127°40′E

Kingdom of Nanzan 南山
- 1314–1429
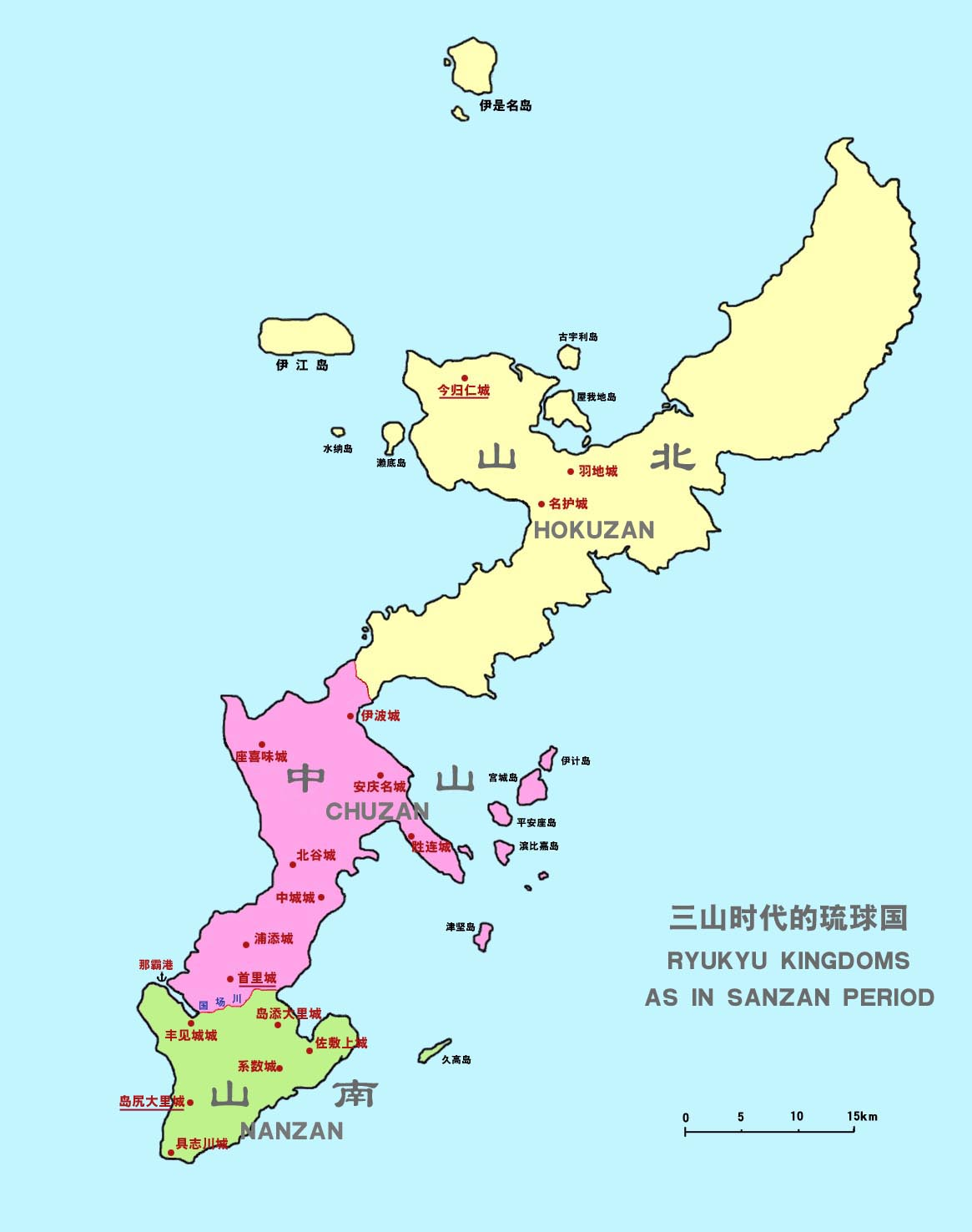
- Map of the Three Kingdoms (Sanzan) of Okinawa, with Nanzan in green.
- Capital: Nanzan Castle
- Common languages: Okinawan
- Religion: Ryukyuan religion
- Government: Monarchy
- King (国王)
  - 1337–1396: Ofusato
  - 1388–1402: Oueishi
  - 1403–1413: Ououso
  - 1415–1429: Taromai
- History
  - Established: 1314
  - Ryukyu unification: 1429
  - Japanese invasion: 5 April 1609
Succeeded by
Ryūkyū Kingdom

Nanzan (南山, Okinawan: Nanzan), also known as Sannan (山南, Okinawan: Sannan) before the 18th century, located in the south of Okinawa Island, was one of three independent political entities which controlled Okinawa in the 14th century. The political entity was identified as a tiny country, a kingdom, or a principality by modern historians; however, the rulers of Nanzan were not "kings", but petty lords with their own retainers owing their direct service, and their own estates.

Okinawa, previously controlled by a number of local chieftains or lords, loosely bound by a paramount chieftain or king of the entire island, split into these three more solidly defined kingdoms within a few years after 1314; the Sanzan period thus began, and would end roughly one hundred years later, when Chūzan's King Shō Hashi conquered Hokuzan in 1419 and Nanzan in 1429.

After the unification of Ryukyu, Nanzan became one of three nominal fu (府, lit. "prefectures") of Ryukyu Kingdom without administrative function.

== History ==
=== Sanzan period: "King of Sannan" ===
Nanzan first came into being in 1314 when Tamagusuku inherited the role of head chieftain of all of Okinawa from his father Eiji; he did not have the charisma or leadership qualities to command the loyalty of all the local lords, and so the Lord of Ōzato, one of many powerful local chieftains, fled south from his home in Urasoe, with a number of lesser chieftains loyal to him, and established himself in Ōzato gusuku near the town of Itoman. Another powerful chieftain fled north and established the kingdom of Hokuzan, leaving Tamagusuku in control only of the central part of the island, which thus became the kingdom of Chūzan.

Nanzan, like the two kingdoms with which it shared the tiny island of Okinawa, consisted of a minuscule territory, and correspondingly limited resources. Nevertheless, the kingdom survived for roughly a century, benefiting from sea trade, and from the advantageous location of Ōzato Castle, situated atop tall bluffs, with an inlet from the sea and its own dedicated dock. Though its ports were not nearly as active as Naha, the chief port of Chūzan, the kingdom enjoyed its share of trade with Southeast Asia, China, and other nearby powers. Chūzan entered a tributary relationship with Ming Dynasty China in 1372. Nanzan was granted similar commercial status shortly afterwards, along with Hokuzan, but was restricted to sending only one ship per tribute mission. Over roughly the next thirty years, nineteen tribute missions were sent from Nanzan to China; Hokuzan sent nine and Chūzan sent fifty-two. Though these missions were meant to be limited to formal trade between the governments of Okinawa and China, it was not unknown for Nanzan officials, like those from the other two kingdoms, to engage in private trade and smuggling. Around 1381, a Nanzan envoy was severely reprimanded for bringing silver into China with which he intended to purchase porcelains for his own personal material gain.

It is believed that, for a time, there may have been two lords vying for control of Nanzan. Ofusato, the first lord of Nanzan, presented himself to the Chinese Imperial Court in 1388, and died while in Korea, ten years later. Theories abound about whether the process of succession in Nanzan was a natural, peaceful one, or whether each successive king achieved his position by rising up again, and killing, his predecessor. As a result, the true lineage is also obscured.

In the 1390s, the kings of all three kingdoms died within a few years, and succession disputes erupted across the island; similar events occurred in Nanking at the same time, with the death of the Hongwu Emperor in 1398. When the Lord of Nanzan, Ofusato, died that same year, his brother Yafuso seized power, and sought formal recognition from China. Previously, China had only ever recognized one head of state on Okinawa, but now all three kingdoms sent envoys and vied for the prestige, wealth, and power that would come with China's favor; no response came from China for eleven years. In 1406, Bunei, King of Chūzan, was formally invested by representatives of the Ming Court in his position; Taromai, king of Nanzan, received this honor in 1415, but quarrels within his royal court prevented Nanzan from ever gaining power.

Following Taromai's death in the late 1420s, succession disputes further weakened Nanzan. Shō Hashi, lord of Chūzan, who had conquered Hokuzan ten years earlier, now seized the opportunity to take Nanzan. He thus united the island of Okinawa into the Ryūkyū Kingdom, marking the end of the independent kingdom of Nanzan.

=== After the unification: Nanzan-fu ===
During Ryukyu Kingdom period, Nanzan was one of three nominal fu (府; lit. "prefectures") of the kingdom without administrative function. At the end of the 17th century, Sannan nominally comprised 15 magiri (間切): Mawashi, Haebaru, Kochinda, Ōzato, Sashiki, Chinen, Tamagusuku, Mabuni, Gushichan, Kyan, Makabe, Takamine, Kanegusuku, Oroku, and Tomigusuku.

During King Shō Kei's reign, the name "Sannan" (山南) was changed into "Nanzan" (南山).

== Rulers of Nanzan ==
Rulers of Nanzan
Name	Kanji	Reign	Line or dynasty	Titles	Notes
Shōsatto/Ofusato	承察度	1314–1398	Ōzato Line	King of Sannan	Lord of Ōzato, the first "King of Sannan"
Oueishi	汪英紫	1398?–1402	Ōzato Dynasty	King's uncle	Ofusato's uncle
Ououso	汪応祖	1403?–1413	Ōzato Dynasty	King of Sannan	Oueishi's second son
Tafuchi	達勃期	1413?–1414?	Ōzato Dynasty	an usurper	Oueishi's eldest son
Taromai	他魯毎	1414?–1429	Ōzato Dynasty	King of Sannan	Ououso's eldest son; the last "king of Sannan"
