= Rouyuan Posthouse =

Building in Fuzhou, Fujian, China

Rouyuan Posthouse (Foochow Romanized: Iù-uōng-ĭk), officially known during the Ming dynasty as the “Tribute Factory Rouyuan Posthouse”, and commonly known among local people as the Ryukyu Hall (Foochow Romanized: Liù-giù-guāng), is a posthouse building in Fuzhou, Fujian Province, China. It is located at No. 40 Guanmei Street, Taijiang District. It was first built in the eighth year of the Chenghua reign of the Ming dynasty, in 1472, and rebuilt in the sixth year of the Kangxi reign of the Qing dynasty, in 1667. From the Ming dynasty to the end of the Qing dynasty, it was used to receive tribute envoys, guests, and merchants from the Ryukyu Kingdom who came to China. After Ryukyuan tribute envoys landed in Fuzhou, they usually first stayed at Rouyuan Posthouse before traveling to the capital to have an audience with the Chinese emperor. Ryukyuan students who came to China at their own expense to study also often hired teachers and received instruction at Rouyuan Posthouse. At that time, Rouyuan Posthouse was large in scale and had affiliated structures such as the Tianfei Temple and the Tribute Factory. After relations between China and Ryukyu were severed in 1876, it lost its function as a tribute-envoy posthouse, and its building area was gradually encroached upon and reduced. Today, Rouyuan Posthouse has been converted into the Fuzhou Museum of the History of Foreign Friendly Relations and is a Fujian provincial cultural relics protection unit.

== History ==
=== Establishment ===
Before the middle of the Ming dynasty, in the late 15th century, direct sailing to Fuzhou Port was the most convenient route between Ryukyu and China. In addition, many of those engaged in Sino-Ryukyuan trade were people from the Fuzhou estuary area who had migrated to Ryukyu in the early Ming dynasty.Therefore, Ryukyuans traveling to China often first stopped at Fuzhou before going to Quanzhou, where the Fujian Maritime Trade Office was located. At that time, the Fuzhou authorities had set up official lodgings in the estuary area outside the Shuibu Gate in the southeast of the city, specifically for Ryukyuans to rest temporarily. Local people in Fuzhou called it the Ryukyu Hall.

In the third year of the Yongle reign of the early Ming dynasty, in 1405, the Yongle Emperor established Laiyuan Posthouse in Quanzhou, affiliated with the Fujian Maritime Trade Office, specifically to receive Ryukyuans. However, because the ships of Ryukyuan envoys and merchants mostly docked in Fuzhou, the Ming court established Huaiyuan Posthouse in Fuzhou in the eighth year of the Chenghua reign, in 1472, to receive Ryukyuans. Its location was near the original Ryukyu Hall in the estuary area outside the Shuibu Gate. The Laiyuan Posthouse in Quanzhou was then abolished. In the tenth year of the Chenghua reign, in 1474, or according to another account in the fifth year of Chenghua,the Ming court moved the Fujian Maritime Trade Office to Fuzhou.During the Wanli reign of the Ming dynasty, to distinguish it from the Huaiyuan Posthouse in Guangzhou, the court renamed the Ryukyu Hall in Fuzhou Rouyuan Posthouse. The name was taken from the phrase “rouyuan neng’er” in the “Shundian” chapter of the Book of Documents, meaning “to treat distant people with kindness, in order to show the court’s utmost benevolence toward them”.

=== Development during the Ming and Qing dynasties ===
During the Ming dynasty, Rouyuan Posthouse was quite large. It contained three front halls, six bedrooms on both sides, five rear halls, twenty-seven bedrooms for foreign sailors on both sides of the rear halls, three rooms at the second gate, six bedrooms for foreign sailors on both sides of the second gate, ten rooms on both sides for the guard chiliarchs, two rooms for soldiers, one main gate, the Tianfei Temple, the Tribute Factory, the Konghai Tower, and Shanggong Bridge. These were used for Ryukyuan envoys and merchants to live in and to store tribute goods and commodities.

In the late Ming and early Qing periods, the Southern Ming Longwu Emperor established his capital in Fuzhou. Later, Qing troops captured Fuzhou, and Rouyuan Posthouse was severely damaged in the war. During the period when Geng Jimao, Prince of Jingnan, occupied Fujian, it was also used as a military barracks, forcing Ryukyuan guests to live in the same place as the troops. In the fifth year of the Kangxi reign, in 1666, King Shō Shitsu of Ryukyu submitted a memorial to the Kangxi Emperor requesting the restoration of Rouyuan Posthouse. Kangxi approved the request and ordered the governor and governor-general of Fujian to rebuild the posthouse, but after the rebuilding, the troops of the Prince of Jingnan still refused to move out. During the Revolt of the Three Feudatories, Rouyuan Posthouse was again heavily damaged in the thirteenth year of Kangxi, in 1674. It was not until the eighteenth year of Kangxi, in 1679, that the Kangxi Emperor ordered it rebuilt. From then on, Rouyuan Posthouse largely retained its general appearance until relations between China and Ryukyu were severed in the fifth year of Guangxu, in 1876.

Over the centuries after the reconstruction in the eighteenth year of Kangxi, Rouyuan Posthouse was expanded or repaired several times. In the thirtieth year of Kangxi, in 1691, the Chongbao Shrine was added. In the thirty-first year of Kangxi, in 1692, Rouyuan Posthouse was severely damaged by a typhoon. The Fujian local government then repaired the side buildings and walls, and also restored the Tianfei Temple inside the posthouse. In the same year, because the number of Ryukyuan tribute envoys had increased to 300, the original posthouse became too small to accommodate them. The Ryukyuan side therefore added four small rooms to the southwest side of the main hall for the tribute envoys to live in.

In the second year of Jiaqing, in 1797, Ryukyuan envoys submitted a memorial requesting repairs to Rouyuan Posthouse, which had long been neglected. The Qing side then had several constitutional officials donate funds to repair all the facilities of Rouyuan Posthouse except the Earth God Shrine and the Chongbao Shrine. On the ninth day of the first month of the ninth year of Jiaqing, in 1804, candles and lamps upstairs in the Tianfei Temple inside the posthouse caught fire. The fire spread to the entire posthouse and even burned to death Nakamura, a waterman from Kumemura who had come on a tribute-receiving ship. This fire caused serious damage and was the largest fire in the history of Rouyuan Posthouse. Although the fire was caused by negligence on the Ryukyuan side, the Qing government still accepted the Ryukyuan envoys’ request for reconstruction in the name of compassion, and restored Rouyuan Posthouse according to its original form.

In the twenty-second year of Daoguang, in 1842, the official residence of the local interpreters of Rouyuan Posthouse in the estuary area was destroyed by strong winds. The son of Pukulingli, a Ryukyuan resident interpreter for tribute-receiving missions, submitted a written request to build another local interpreter’s residence. The Qing government therefore built a new local interpreter’s residence in the twenty-fourth year of Daoguang, in 1844, to the right of the original official residence. It was five bays long and two bays wide. In the twelfth year of Tongzhi, in 1873, Rouyuan Posthouse underwent its last major repair before relations between China and Ryukyu were severed. The local interpreter’s residence was expanded to five and a half rooms in length and four and a half rooms in width.

=== From the fall of Ryukyu to the present ===
In 1875, Japan forced Ryukyu to stop paying tribute to the Qing dynasty, close the Fuzhou Ryukyu Hall, and accept its annexation demands. In 1876, after negotiations between Ryukyu and the Qing side failed, relations between China and Ryukyu were severed, and Rouyuan Posthouse in Fuzhou lost its function as a residence for Ryukyuan envoys. After Japan formally annexed Ryukyu in 1879, the Japanese side once proposed that Japan should succeed Ryukyu and inherit Rouyuan Posthouse as Japanese property, but this was rejected by the Chinese side.

Despite this, Ryukyuans traveling to Fuzhou, in practice including many Japanese people, continued to use the building as a residence in Fuzhou. Around the outbreak of the Russo-Japanese War, the Ryukyuan Hu Yueting, whose Chinese name was Hu Guoshan, courtesy name Yueting, and whose Japanese-style name was Gima Seichū, came to Fuzhou with his four brothers. They used the Ryukyu Hall site to open the Taiji Tea Firm and engaged in trade between Fujian and Naha. In addition, other Ryukyuans such as Maehira Chōsei and Makabe Chōshō, who opened the Shenghe Store, also came to Fuzhou to do business, with the area around Rouyuan Posthouse as their center. Hu Yueting did not return to Okinawa until after the outbreak of war between China and Japan in July 1937.

By the 1990s, the original Rouyuan Posthouse had gradually been encroached upon and reduced to less than one-tenth of its original size. In 1992, the Fuzhou municipal government restored Rouyuan Posthouse. Its building area was then only 600 square meters, and it was used as the Fuzhou Museum of the History of Foreign Friendly Relations, displaying the history of Fuzhou’s overseas exchanges, including exhibits on Sino-Ryukyuan and Sino-Japanese relations. In 1996, the Fujian Provincial People’s Government designated Rouyuan Posthouse as part of the fourth batch of provincial cultural relics protection units.

== Architecture ==
=== Original building ===
During the Ming dynasty, Rouyuan Posthouse was already large in scale. It had three front halls, six bedrooms on both sides, five rear halls, twenty-seven bedrooms for foreign sailors on both sides of the rear halls, three rooms at the second gate, six bedrooms for foreign sailors on both sides of the second gate, ten rooms on both sides for the guard chiliarchs, two rooms for soldiers, and one main gate.In addition, there was an attached Tianfei Temple for worshipping the goddess Mazu, a Tribute Factory for storing, inspecting, and processing tribute goods and commodities, as well as the Konghai Tower and Shanggong Bridge.

After the reconstruction in the eighteenth year of Kangxi, in 1679, the Qing-dynasty Rouyuan Posthouse had a main gate and a ceremonial gate, with eleven side-building rooms on each side. There was also an official residence for the posthouse inspector outside the ceremonial gate, and a Tianfei Temple shrine of three small rooms behind the hall. In addition, during the Kangxi and Daoguang reigns, the Chongbao Shrine, the four small rooms, and the local interpreter’s residence were added. Its area was no less than 6,000 square meters.

Because the hall enshrined Mazu of Meizhou, it was also known as the Qiongshui Qiushang Tianhou Temple. Its old site was within the Taibao area of the estuary. It was first built in the third year of Daoguang, in 1823, and was expanded and rebuilt on the old foundation in the nineteenth year of Daoguang, in 1839. This guild hall was jointly built by ten families descended from the “Thirty-six Min Families” who engaged in this trade, so it was commonly known as the “Ten-Family Row”. As for the name “Ten-Family Row”, it is generally believed to refer to ten families from seven surnames. For example, the Min County Local Gazetteer records: “Four households surnamed Li, and one household each surnamed Zheng, Song, Ding, Bian, Wu, and Zhao, sold Ryukyuan goods on behalf of Ryukyu.”

=== Present building ===
The present Rouyuan Posthouse was restored in 1992 and converted into the Fuzhou Museum of the History of Foreign Friendly Relations. The museum is located on the west side of the original site’s main gate, at No. 40 Guanmei Street, Taijiang District, Fuzhou. The building is only a small part of the original Rouyuan Posthouse complex. It faces south, with a screen wall behind the main gate, followed by a courtyard, with side shelters on both sides. The main hall building is three bays wide and five columns deep. It is a two-story timber building made of fir wood in the column-and-tie structural system. The building is surrounded by fire-sealing walls and covers an area of about 600 square meters. It is used to display cultural relics and other exhibits related to the history of Sino-Ryukyuan relations.The front and rear courtyards are decorated with traditional rockery bonsai. The rear courtyard also contains dozens of collected tombstones of ancient Ryukyuans buried in Fuzhou.

== Functions and influence ==
Historically, Rouyuan Posthouse provided food and lodging for Ryukyuan tribute envoys and their attendants, while also serving as a hub for commercial and cultural exchange between China and Ryukyu. After Ryukyuan tribute envoys arrived in Fuzhou, they first stayed at Rouyuan Posthouse to rest and prepare. Once preparations were complete, the chief and deputy Ryukyuan envoys, chief interpreter, chief secretary, envoy assistants, and others, numbering between eighteen and twenty people, would go to the capital to present tribute. The rest of the entourage remained at Rouyuan Posthouse. During this period, the Fuzhou local government was responsible for supplying the mission with rice and grain, issuing vegetable and firewood allowances, and preparing banquets for the mission.

Rouyuan Posthouse was also a trading place between China and Ryukyu. Whenever Ryukyuan envoys came to present tribute, the Qing government allowed ten Ryukyuan merchants to conduct Sino-Ryukyuan trade inside Rouyuan Posthouse. Ryukyuan merchants often became intermediaries for Japanese and Southeast Asian goods entering the Chinese market. Their trade included metal products, gemstones, ivory, spices, medicinal materials, minerals, dried seafood, and daily-use goods imported into China, as well as timber, textiles, porcelain, tea, handicrafts, and stationery exported from China. Many Ryukyuan students who came to China to seek knowledge also studied Chinese culture at Rouyuan Posthouse. In addition, whenever Ryukyuan refugees whose ships had met with accidents and drifted to the southeastern coast of China arrived there, the Chinese government placed them in Rouyuan Posthouse while they awaited repatriation, and covered their living expenses in China. Rouyuan Posthouse also housed spirit tablets of Ryukyuans who died in China. When Japanese scholars visited Rouyuan Posthouse in the early 1930s, more than 900 Ryukyuan spirit tablets were still preserved there.

Because the Ming dynasty strictly restricted foreign trade, Fuzhou, as the designated port for Sino-Ryukyuan trade, received the vast majority of Ryukyuans who came to China. Most of them lived in Rouyuan Posthouse. Whenever a Ryukyuan tribute ship arrived, it was guided to the river below the Tribute Factory. The goods were carried by local laborers in Fuzhou to the Tribute Factory inside Rouyuan Posthouse, where Ming officials inspected them. The Ryukyuan tribute envoys and merchants were then received into Rouyuan Posthouse to rest. The gate of Rouyuan Posthouse was guarded by three chiliarchs and thirty soldiers to prevent Ryukyuans from entering and leaving without authorization or privately engaging in commodity transactions. Goods used for trade were introduced to merchants by official Ming brokers acting as intermediaries, and the place of trade was limited to Fuzhou. The Qing dynasty continued the Ming practice and strictly restricted Ryukyuan merchants’ trade to Rouyuan Posthouse. After 1823, the third year of Daoguang, with the establishment of the Qiushang Guild Hall by broker organizations near the sluice gate in the Taibao area of Taijiang, Fuzhou, Sino-Ryukyuan trade was allowed to move to the Qiushang Guild Hall.

Ryukyuan students who came to China during the Ming and Qing dynasties were divided into two types: “Tang students” and “diligent learners”. Tang students were government-funded students, all from the Ryukyuan royal family or noble families. They were arranged to study at the Imperial Academy in Beijing or Nanjing, and their expenses were borne by the Chinese government. Diligent learners were self-funded students. They were more numerous than the Tang students, and many came from Kumemura in Naha. Their place of study was Rouyuan Posthouse in Fuzhou. The subjects taught at Rouyuan Posthouse included Confucian learning, astronomy, calendrical studies, geography, music, painting, and even agriculture and handicrafts. The Ryukyuan diligent learners trained at Rouyuan Posthouse greatly promoted the development of Ryukyu. Examples include Jin Qiang, the first Ryukyuan to compile a calendar; Cai Zhaogong, who promulgated the Great Qing Shixian Calendar in Ryukyu; Sai On, a Ryukyuan sanshikan of the 18th century; Noguni Sōkan, a Ryukyuan student who brought sweet potato cultivation techniques from Fujian to Ryukyu; and Ryukyuan painters Qu Ziqian, also known as Ishimine Peechin Denmo, and Cha Kangxin, also known as Uehara Shinchī, all of whom had hired teachers and received instruction at Rouyuan Posthouse in Fuzhou.

In the late Qing period, Rouyuan Posthouse also became an important source through which Japan obtained information about conditions in China. Information about China was transmitted from Rouyuan Posthouse to the Ryukyu Kingdom, then from the Ryukyu Kingdom to the Satsuma Domain in Japan, and finally to the Edo shogunate. After Japan annexed Ryukyu in 1879, some Ryukyuans who were still at Rouyuan Posthouse returned home to take part in the movement to save Ryukyu, while others later secretly returned from Ryukyu to Rouyuan Posthouse in Fuzhou to continue their activities for national salvation.Rouyuan Posthouse became an important base for many “exiles to Qing”, including Shō Tokukō, also known as Kōchi Uēkata Chōjō, and Mō Hōrai, also known as Tomikawa Uēkata Seikei, to organize national-salvation activities in China. It was not until after the Qing dynasty was defeated in the First Sino-Japanese War in 1895 that these Ryukyuans gradually returned home. After Japan implemented conscription in 1898, many people came to Rouyuan Posthouse to engage in economic activities in order to avoid military service, until the outbreak of the Second Sino-Japanese War in 1937.

== As the Fuzhou Museum of the History of Foreign Friendly Relations ==
Today, Rouyuan Posthouse is used by the city of Fuzhou as the Fuzhou Museum of the History of Foreign Friendly Relations. The museum displays cultural relics and other exhibits related to diplomatic, cultural, commercial, and other exchanges between Fuzhou and overseas regions. Its contents are not limited to exchanges between Fuzhou and Ryukyu, but also include the history of Fuzhou’s overseas exchanges before the Ming dynasty and modern exchanges between Fuzhou and Japan. Figures connected with Fuzhou’s overseas exchanges, such as Marco Polo, the Japanese monk Kūkai, Zheng He, and the Fuqing-born Chan master Yinyuan, are included in the exhibition. A stone stele inscribed “Sino-Japanese friendship, evergreen for all ages” also stands at the museum site.

The west wing room downstairs in the main hall is used as the “Fuzhou Museum of the History of Foreign Friendly Relations”, displaying written and photographic introductions to the history of Fuzhou’s overseas exchanges, as well as physical cultural relics. The east wing room and the second floor display exhibits related to friendly exchanges between China and Ryukyu and between China and Japan. Gifts from the ancient Ryukyu Kingdom are mostly displayed upstairs. Among them, a precious oyster shell as large as a dou, presented by the Ryukyu king to Lin Hongnian, a Fuzhou official who served as an envoy to Ryukyu during the Daoguang reign in the 19th century, is especially valuable. Souvenirs presented to Fuzhou by Naha, Okinawa Prefecture, Japan, Fuzhou’s sister city, after the 1980s are displayed in the east wing room on the first floor. Most of them are Okinawan lacquer plates, Naha bashō cloth, tea sets, silk fabrics, and similar items.

== See also ==
Ryukyu Hall

Hekou Wanshou Bridge

Ryukyu Cemetery
