= Shiseibyō =

Confucian temple in Okinawa Prefecture, Japan

Coordinates: 26°13′09″N 127°40′19″E

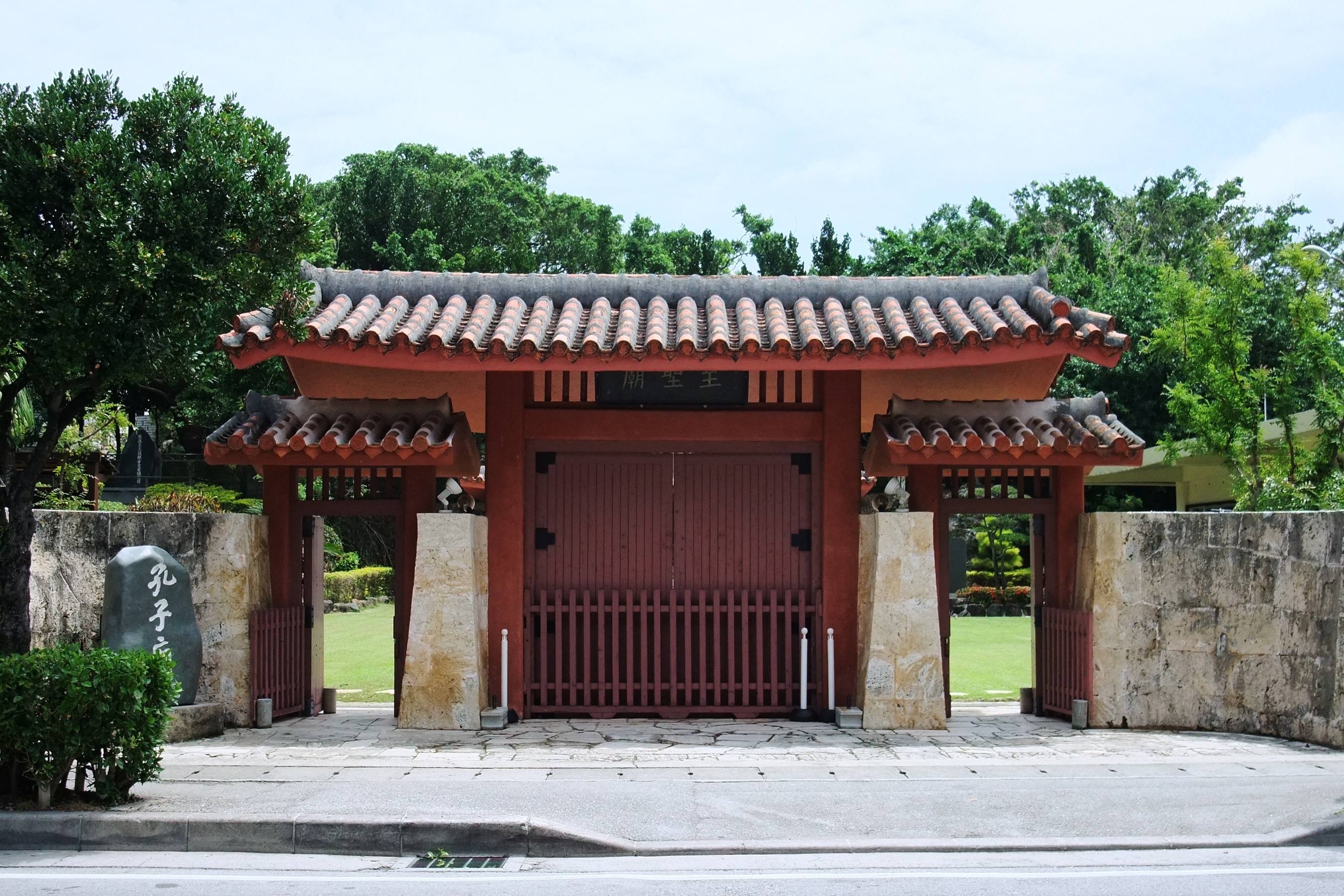
Main gate to the Shiseibyō. "Confucius temple" (孔子廟) can be seen written on a stone to the left of the gate.

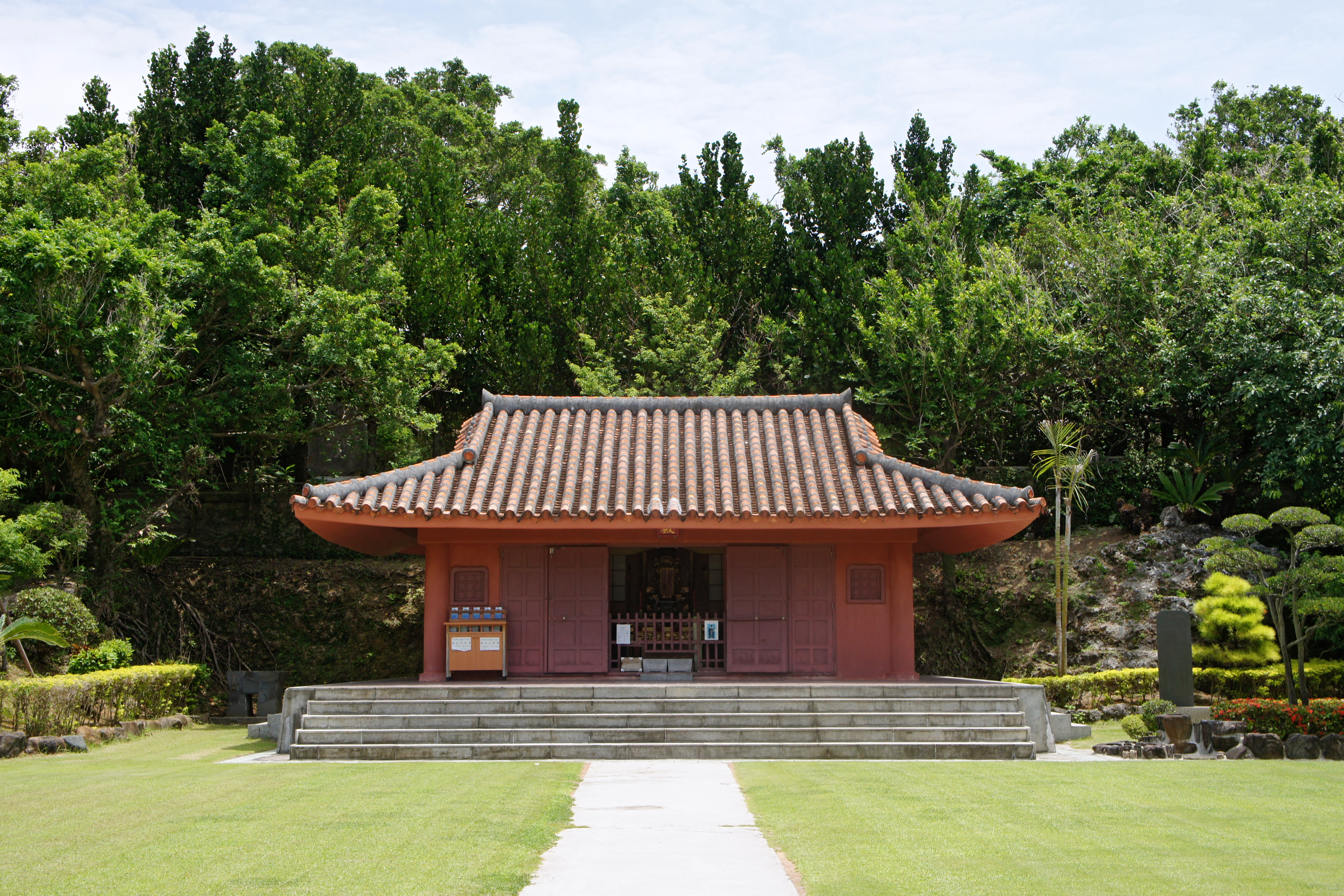
Taiseiden is the Main Hall of Shiseibyō.

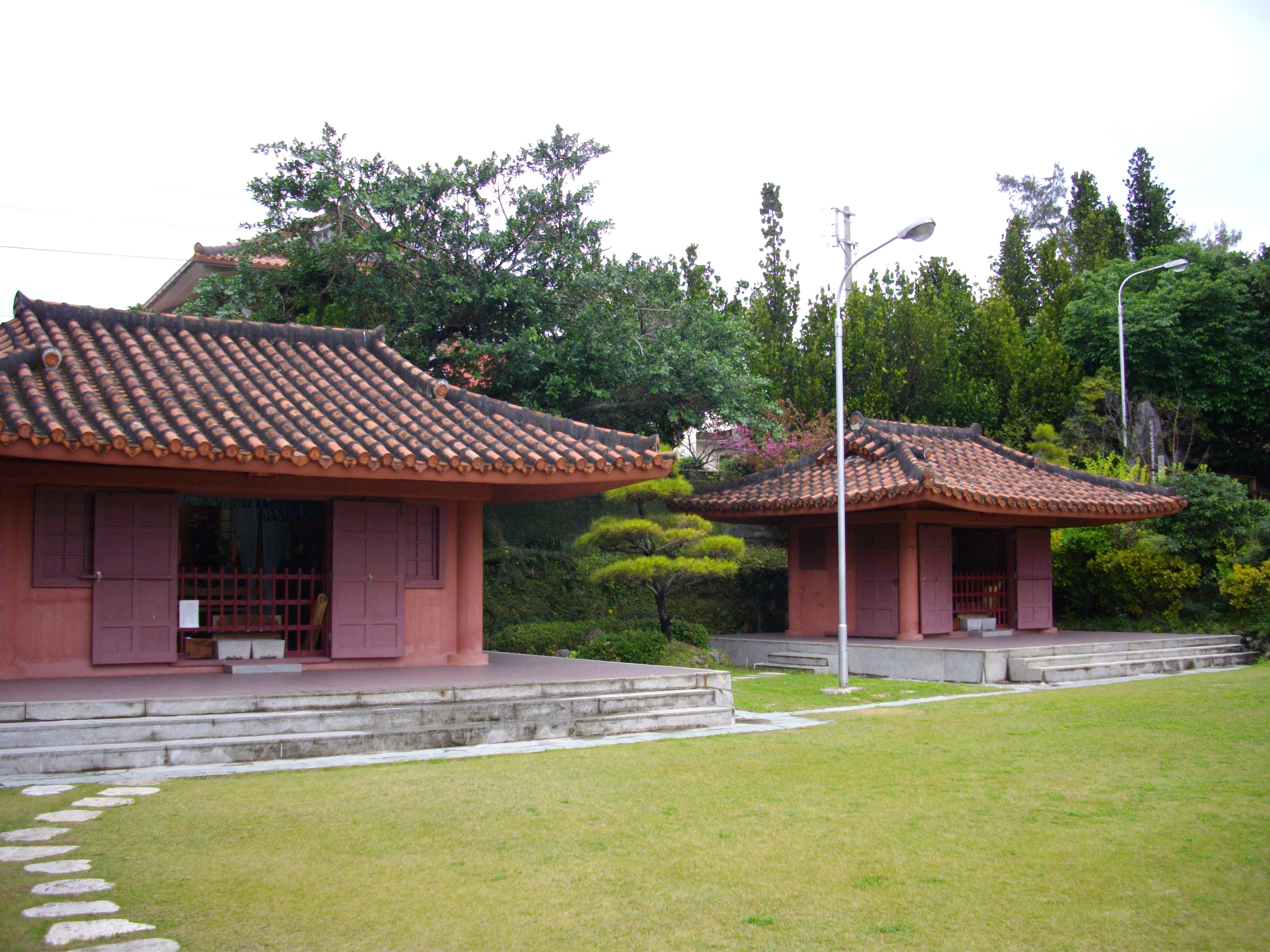
Tensonbyō (left) and Tenpigū (right) Taoist shrines.

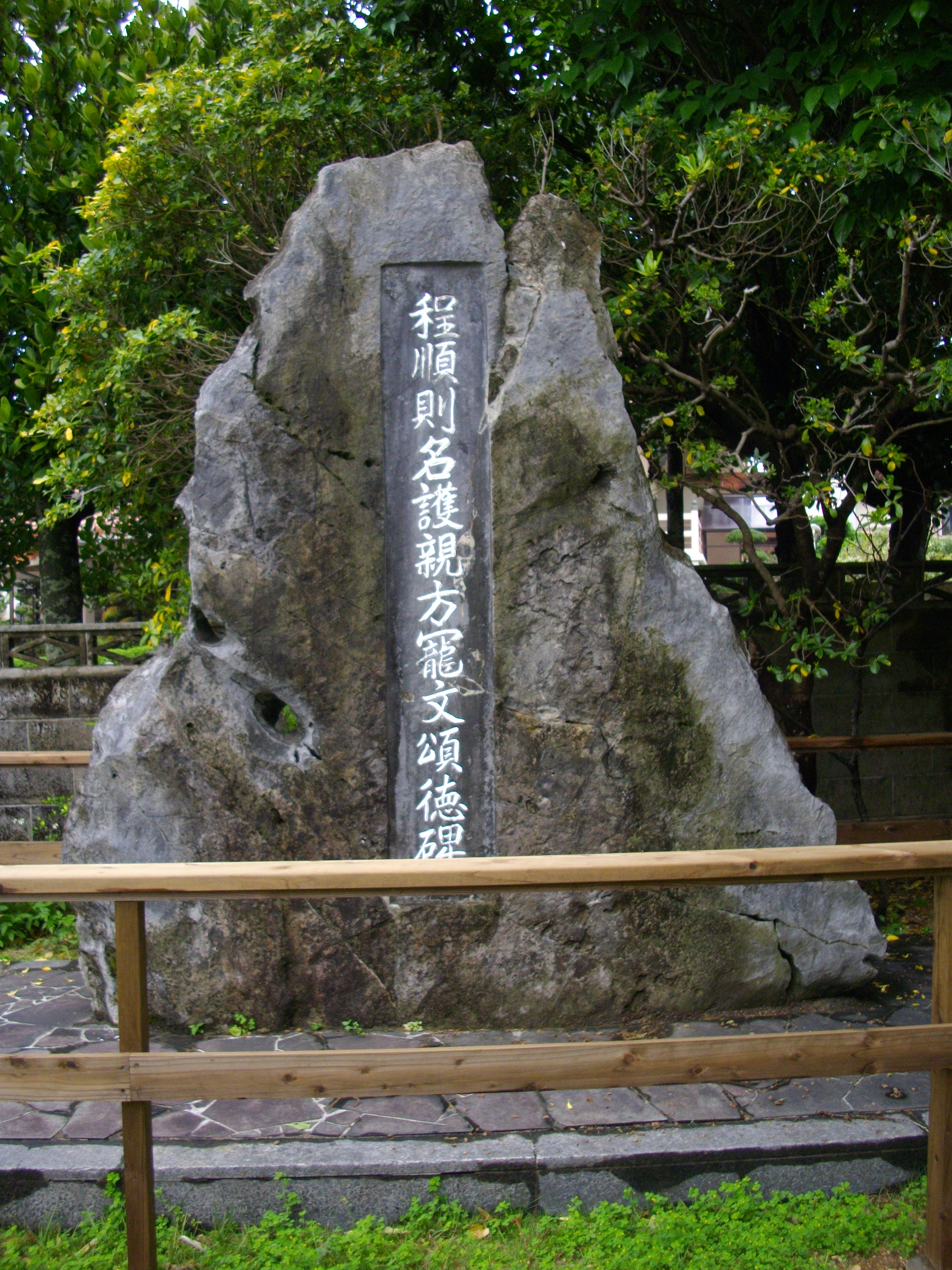
Stele devoted to Tei Junsoku, 18th century magistrate of Kumemura, who effected the establishment of the Meirindō as a center of Confucian learning.

The Shiseibyō (至聖廟) is a Confucian temple in the Wakasa district of Naha, Okinawa. It served for centuries as a major center of Chinese learning for the Ryūkyū Kingdom, and contains within its precincts the Meirindō, first public school in Okinawa.

== History ==
The current temple was built in 1975, as a rebuilding of an older temple located a short distance away, near what is now a major highway, Japan National Route 58.

The original temple was built in 1671–75 as a gift to the Ryūkyū Kingdom from the Kangxi Emperor of the Qing Dynasty in China. It served as the primary Confucian temple of the kingdom, and would soon become a center of learning within Kumemura, the community of scholars and bureaucrats which was the center of Chinese culture and learning in the kingdom. In 1718, local official Tei Junsoku, magistrate of Kumemura, and something of an unofficial minister of education, established the Meirindō, the first formal educational institute in the kingdom, as a center of learning for the Kumemura community of scholar-bureaucrats.

Following the abolition of the kingdom and annexation of Okinawa by Japan in 1879, the Kumemura community, along with the Meirindō school and the temple as a whole, fell into decline. The Meirindō became a municipal office and public school under the national education system established under the Meiji government. Historian George Kerr cites a July 1910 newspaper advertisement as the last evidence of public interest in annual ceremonial visits to the temple by those who had lived in the time of the Ryūkyū Kingdom.

The temple was destroyed in the 1945 battle of Okinawa and rebuilt in 1975 on the premises of the Tensonbyō, a smaller Confucian temple in the Wakasa area also destroyed in the battle.

=== Lawsuit ===
There are many Confucius temples in Japan, which generally serve as historical places of learning and ceremony and are preserved by state funds. However, the Shiseibyō is unique in that it was built by a family of Chinese origin. Right-wing critics such as Shinohara Akira have complained that it attracts Chinese tourists.

In 2014, an immigrant to Okinawa sued the government of Okinawa, claiming that the Shiseibyō violates the separation of church and state. In 2021, the Supreme Court of Japan ruled that the placement of the Shiseibyō in a public park is unconstitutional. They found that Japanese-built Confucius temples are educational facilities, but the Shiseibyō was built by ethnic Chinese and is therefore not educational in purpose, not withstanding the fact that it contains the former public school Meirindō.

In 2022, an additional lawsuit was filed requesting to demolish the Shiseibyō. In 2025, the Supreme Court rejected this lawsuit, saying that the issue had been resolved since the Shiseibyō now collects an admission fee.

== Buildings and monuments ==
The temple grounds are small, covering roughly one or two acres. The central devotion hall, called Taiseiden (大成殿), is a shrine to both Confucius, and to the four Chinese philosophers, Zengzi, Zisi, Yan Hui, and Mencius, known as the Four Sages.

A smaller building to the left of the entrance, called the Tenson-byō (天尊廟), is devoted to those who fought to defend the country, and to Guan Yu and the Dragon King, Taoist deities and figures in Chinese folklore and mythology. The Tensonbyō was located on this site prior to 1975, when the old Kumemura Confucian temple, destroyed in World War II, was rebuilt here as the Shiseidō, incorporating the Tensonbyō into the new facility. The Tenpigū (天妃宮) next to it is devoted to Tenpi, also called Matsu or Mazu, the Taoist goddess of the sea, of sailors, navigators, and fishermen.

The Meirindō (明倫堂) lies to the right of the entrance, next to the temple offices, and currently serves as the meeting place for the local Confucianist Association (崇聖会, Sōseikai), and holds an archive of roughly 10,000 volumes ranging from historical documents related to the locality and to foreign trade, to schoolbooks.

Three memorial steles are located within the temple grounds: one to the Chūzan Confucian temple originally established in the 17th century as a gift from the Kangxi Emperor; one to Sai On, historian, government official, reformed, and royal regent at the time the temple was constructed; and one to Tei Junsoku, magistrate of Kumemura and educational force who established the Meirindō as a center of learning.
