= Sannan =

Sannan may refer to:

- Sannan, a former town in Hyōgo Prefectur, Japan
- King of Sannan, a title claimed by a line of local rulers on Okinawa Island from the late 14th century to the early 15th centuries
- Steinkjersannan, Norway
