= Ōzato Castle =

Ruins of a castle on Okinawa Island, Japan

Ōzato Castle 島添大里城
- Nanjō, Okinawa
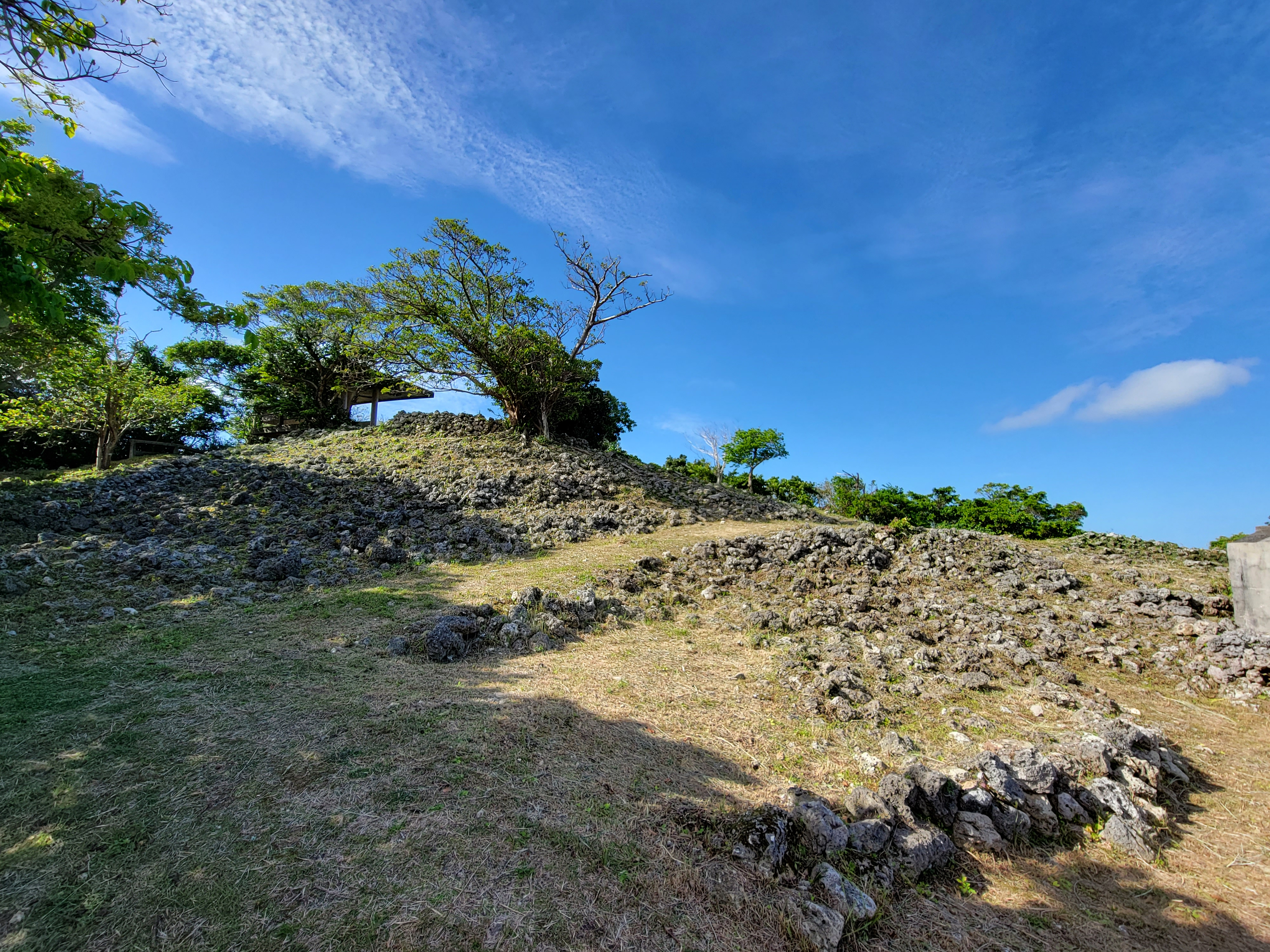
- Ruins in February 2023

Site information
- Type: Gusuku
- Open to the public: yes
- Condition: Ruins

Location
- Ōzato Castle
- Location within Okinawa Prefecture Location within Japan
- Coordinates: 26°11′11.76″N 127°45′36.51″E

Site history
- Built: early 14th century
- Built by: Ōzato Magiri Aji
- In use: early 14th century – 1429
- Materials: Ryukyuan limestone, wood

Garrison information
- Occupants: Aji of Ōzato Magiri
- National Historic Site of Japan

Ōzato Castle (大里城, Ōzato jō; Okinawan: Ufuzatu Gushiku), officially Shimasoe-Ōzato Castle (島添大里城, Shimasoe-Ōzato jō; Okinawan: Shimashii-Ufuzatu Gushiku), is a Ryūkyūan gusuku fortification located in the Ōzato neighborhood of the city of Nanzan and used until 1429. It has been protected by Japan's central government as a National Historic Site since 2012.

== History ==
Located near the southern tip of Okinawa Island's east coast, the castle is located at the eastern end of a tongue-shaped Ryūkyū limestone hill about 150 meters above sea level, with steep cliffs from north to west. The castle measures approximately 210 meters north to south and 270 meters east-to-west and is surrounded by double walls. The inner wall is approximately six meters high and approximately 175 meters long. The outer wall's stonework remains to the west and northeast of the castle ruins, and remains of the main hall with its foundation stone have been confirmed. While the year of construction is unknown, it was originally built by Shimajiri-Ōzato Aji, Ōzato Ofusato, who broke away from the chieftain Tamagusuku at Urasoe Castle in 1314 and proclaimed himself the King of Nanzan. During the Sanzan period the castle served as a secondary castle of Nanzan Castle. It fell into disuse after the capture of Nanzan Castle in 1429.

However, it was captured by Shō Hashi, who was based in Sashiki Gusuku, in 1402 and subsequently came under the sphere of influence of the First Shō Dynasty. During the Shō Dynasty, it was used as a detached palace until at least the mid-15th century, and in contemporary accounts it was a palace comparable to Shuri Castle. In 1683, a Qing dynasty investiture envoy visited the by then abandoned Ōzato Castle.

During the Battle of Okinawa in 1945, a military camp was established within the castle, and the castle walls were repurposed for building materials. Combined with attacks by the U.S. military, the castle suffered significant damage. After the war, most of the ruins were lost as they were used for reconstruction materials. In 1961, materials were donated by the U.S. military to build an observation deck and concrete roads as part of a park project. Archaeological excavations began in 1990, and Chinese ceramics, metal products, and ornaments have also been excavated, showing the extensive trade that Nanzan had done with Ming China.

The castle site is about a 30-minute drive from Naha Airport.

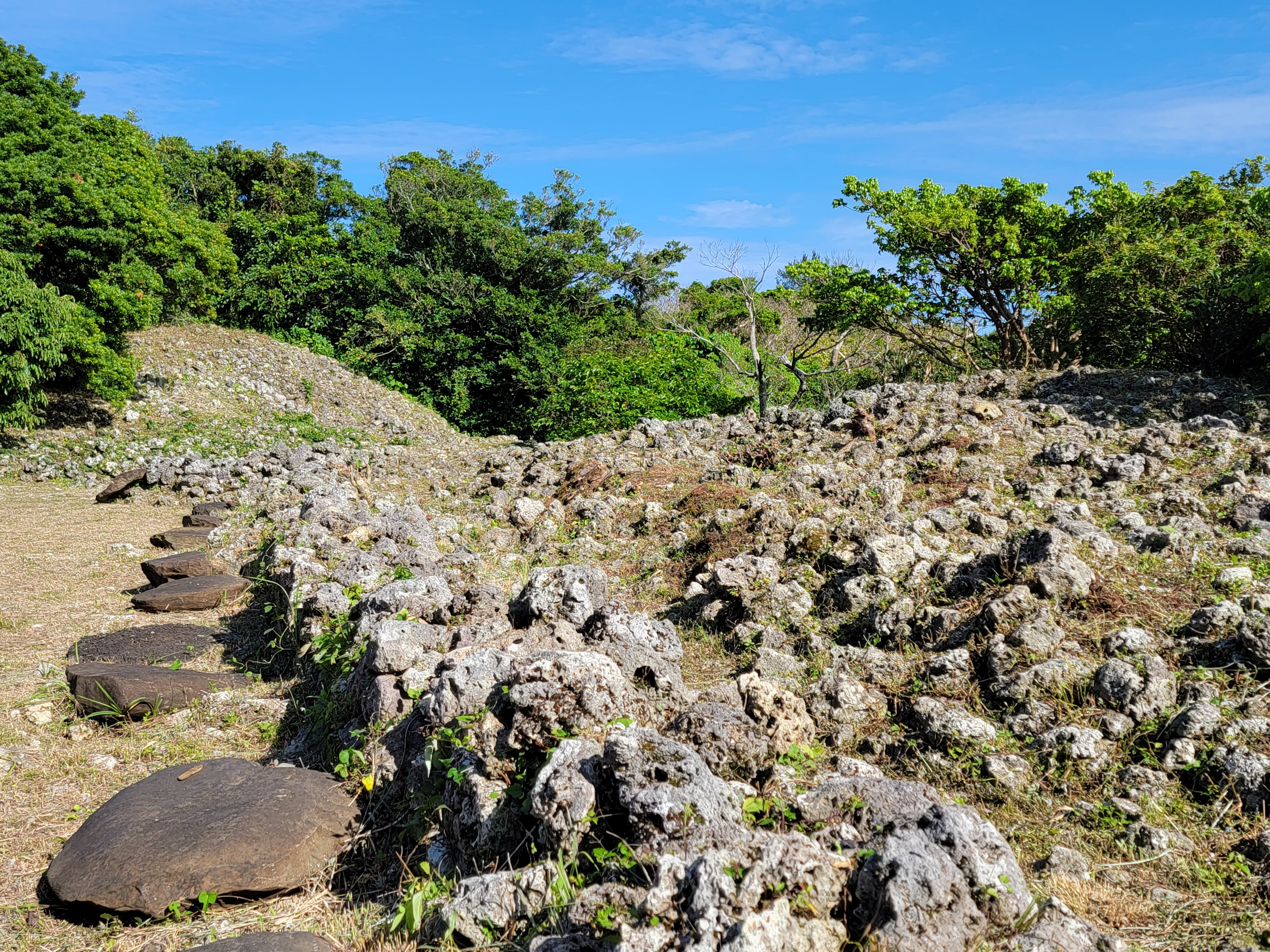
Castle yard

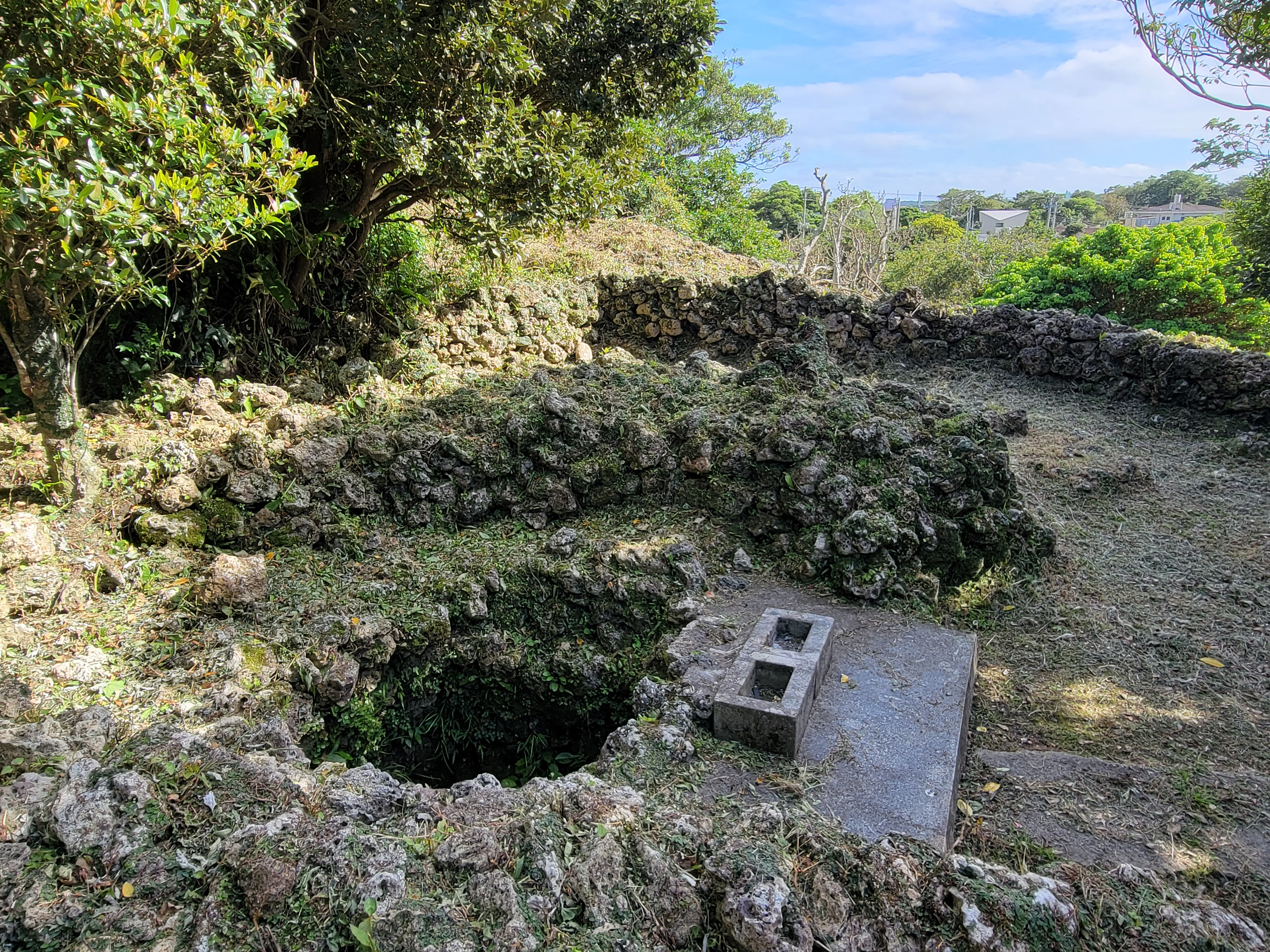
Well

== See also ==
- List of Historic Sites of Japan (Okinawa)
