= Shōsatto =

Shōsatto 承察度

King of Sannan
- Reign: ?–1403 (traditional dates)
- Successor: Ōōso
- Died: 1403 (traditional date)

Shōsatto (承察度), read variously as Ōzato, Ofosato, and Ufusatu, was a local ruler of Okinawa Island who was given the title of King of Sannan. Contemporary sources on Shōsatto are very scarce. Following a visit of a Chinese envoy to Okinawa Island, he first sent a tributary mission in 1380. His last contact was in 1396. His "reign" deviated too much from the ideological ideal. Only the "king" should have a tributary relationship with the Chinese emperor, but the "King's father's younger brother" (王叔) Ōeishi also sent envoys from 1388 to 1397. In 1403, Ōōso, who claimed to be Shōsatto's younger brother or cousin, reported Shōsatto's death in 1403 and was recognized as King of Sannan the next year.

His real name is unknown. Modern attempts to decipher the enigmatic un-Okinawan name Shōsatto point to Ōzato (大里), a toponym with multiple referents. There were two candidates in southern Okinawa: Shimasoe-Ōzato in modern-day Nanjō City and Shimajiri-Ōzato in modern-day Itoman City.

The Annals of the Joseon Dynasty of Korea record mysterious events about the King of Sannan. In 1394, Satto, King of Chūzan, requested Korea to return Shōsatto, Prince of Sannan (山南王子承察度), who had supposedly fled to Korea. In 1398, Onsadō, King of Sannan (山南王温沙道), fled to Korea after reportedly being banished by the King of Chūzan. He died there in the same year. These records contradict the Veritable Records, raising questions about the reliability of Okinawa's diplomatic correspondence with foreign countries.

Historian Ikuta Shigeru speculates that the King of Sannan was a puppet of the King of Chūzan from the very beginning. He re-interpretes the phrase "Prince of Sannan" (山南王子) as a title given by the King of Chūzan to his senior retainer, possibly his blood relative. Historian Wada Hisanori criticized Ikuta's hypothesis, arguing that the King of Chūzan's subjugation of the King of Sannan began later, during the reign of King Ōōso.

The Chūzan Seikan (1650), Ryūkyū's first official history book, identified the King of Sannan as the Aji of Ōzato. The Chūzan Seikan only made a single reference to Shōsatto: It claimed that Shōsatto, King of Sannan, together with the Kings of Chūzan and Sanhoku, paid tribute to the Chinese emperor for the first time in 1372. This statement contradicts Chinese records, which dated the first mission to 1380. Sai Taku's edition of the Chūzan Seifu (1701) generally followed the Chūzan Seikan, but Sai On's edition of the Chūzan Seifu (1725) drastically rewrote history. Having access to Chinese diplomatic records, he added the records of tributary missions sent under the name of Shōsatto. Sai On naïvely inferred that Shōsatto died in 1403, the year Ōōso reported his death to the Chinese emperor.

== Notes ==
Preceded by unknown	King of Sannan ?–1403 (traditional dates)	Succeeded by Ōōso
