= Tei Junsoku =

18th Century Chinese Official

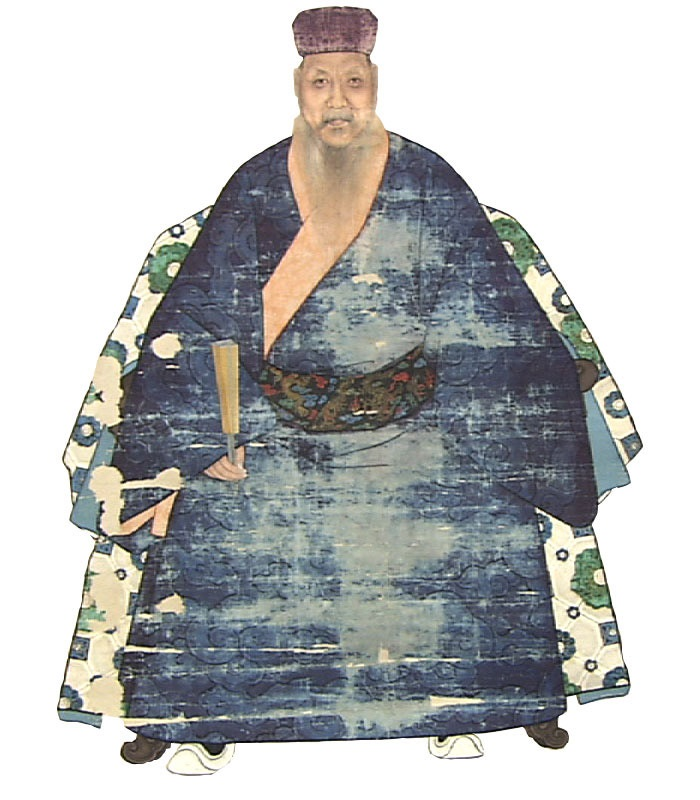
An official portrait of Tei Junsoku.

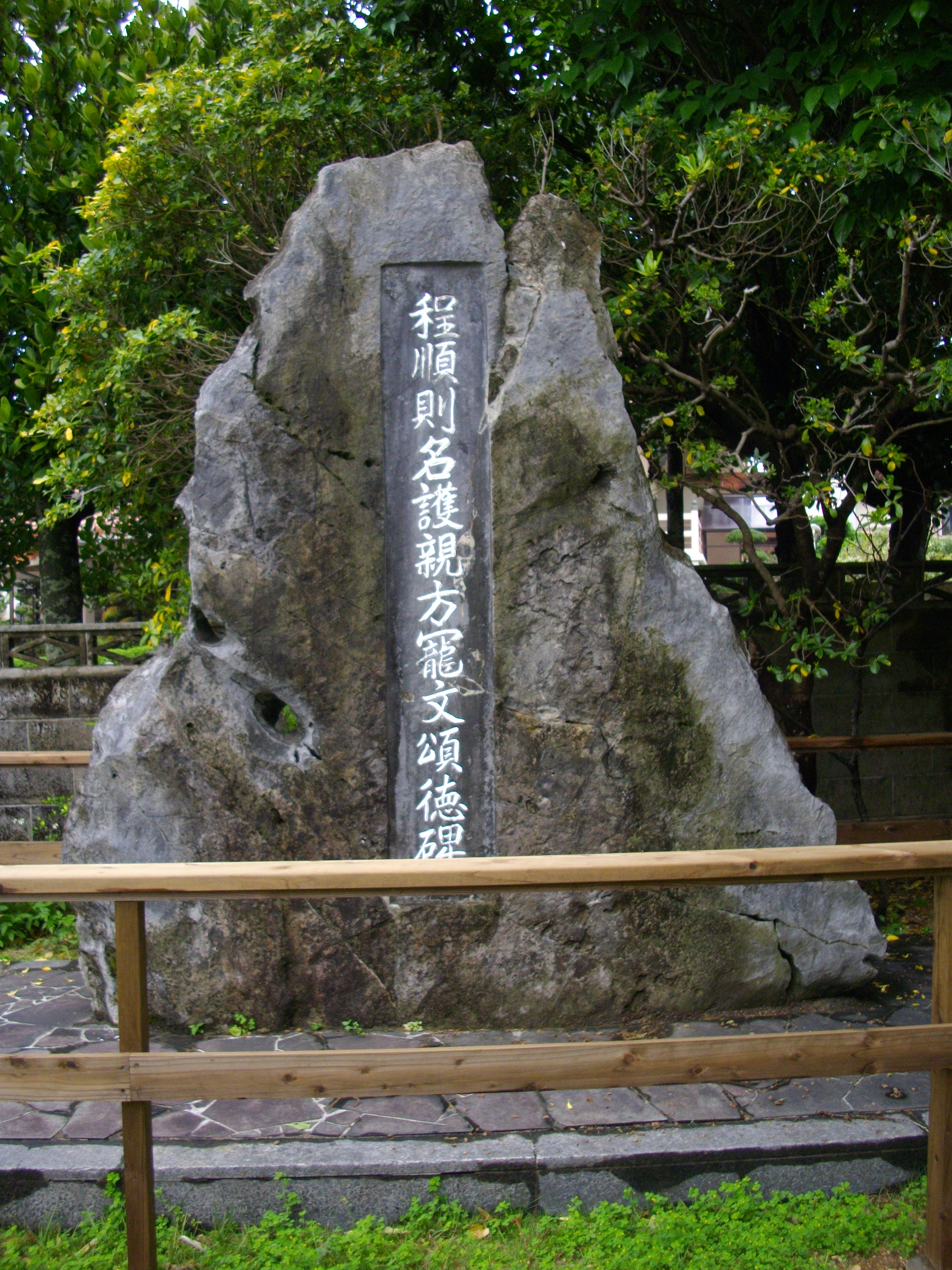
Memorial stele at Shiseibyō Confucian temple in Naha, Okinawa dedicated to Tei Junsoku.

Tei Junsoku (程順則) (1663–1734), or Cheng Shunze in Chinese, was a Confucian scholar and government official of the Ryūkyū Kingdom. He has been described as being "in an unofficial sense... the 'minister of education'", and is particularly famous for his contributions to scholarship and education in Okinawa and Japan. Holding ueekata rank in the Ryukyuan government, he served at times in his career as magistrate of both Nago and Kumemura, and as a member of the Sanshikan, the elite council of three chief advisors to the king. He is sometimes known as the "Sage of Nago" (名護聖人).

It was standard at the time for members of Ryūkyū's aristocratic class to have two names. "Tei Junsoku" was his Chinese-style name, while "Nago Ueekata Chōbun" (名護 親方 寵文), incorporating his domain and rank, was his Yamato or Japanese-style name.

== Life and career ==
Tei Junsoku was born in Kumemura, the Okinawan center of classical Chinese learning, in 1663. He first journeyed to China in 1683 and stayed there for four years, studying the Confucian classics, among other subjects, just as many others raised and educated in the scholar-bureaucrat system in Kumemura did over the course of the kingdom's history. He would return to China several times during his career, serving as interpreter and in other roles as a member of official missions from the kingdom.

In 1714, he accompanied royal princes Yonagusuku and Kin in the kingdom's official tribute mission to Edo (琉球江戸上り, Ryūkyū Edo nobori), the seat of Japan's Tokugawa shogunate. While there, he met with a number of the top Confucian scholars in Tokugawa Japan, including Arai Hakuseki, chief advisor to the shōgun, who is known to have had a particular interest in the exotic Ryūkyū Kingdom, Ogyū Sorai, and Sōrai's student Dazai Shundai. As a result of this meeting, Hakuseki would go on to write a History of the Southern Islands (南島史, nantōshi) in 1719; Shundai would likewise include comments about the Ryūkyū Kingdom and its relationship to Satsuma han in his works.

As magistrate of Kumemura, Junsoku oversaw in 1718 the establishment of the Meirindō, a school for study of the Chinese classics, on the grounds of the village's Confucian temple. The Meirindō quickly grew into the chief center for Chinese learning in the kingdom, and would later become the first public school in Okinawa prefecture. A stele dedicated to Junsoku stands in the rebuilt and relocated Confucian temple today.

Some time shortly thereafter, Junsoku presented to the shōgun, Tokugawa Yoshimune, via Satsuma, a copy of Six Courses in Morals (六諭衍義, rikuyuengi), a volume of Confucian maxims he compiled himself. A version annotated by Ogyū Sōrai and translated from the Chinese by shogunal advisor Muro Kyūsō would be reproduced and distributed and used as an element of textbooks in terakoya (temple schools) and later in public schools in Japan into the early 20th century.
