= Ōōso =

Ōōso 汪応祖

King of Sannan
- Reign: 1403–1414 (traditional dates)
- Predecessor: Shōsatto
- Successor: Taromai

Ōōso (汪応祖) was a local ruler of Okinawa Island, who was given the title of King of Sannan. He first contacted the Chinese emperor in 1403, claiming himself to be a younger brother or cousin of Shōsatto, the late King of Sannan, who reportedly had no son. Ōōso was given the title in the next year. His last contact was of 1413. In 1415, Taromai, who styled himself Crown Prince, reported Ōōso's death. He claimed that Ōōso was killed by his elder brother Tabuchi, who had in turn been killed by local chiefs, in favor of Crown Prince Taromai.

His real name is unknown. The name Ōōso is enigmatic and highly un-Okinawan. A desperate attempt of decipherment relates it to Yaese (八重瀬), a fortress in southern Okinawa.

Historian Ikuta Shigeru speculates that the King of Sannan was a puppet of the King of Chūzan from the very beginning. According to his theory, Ōōso reported to the Chinese emperor that King Shōsatto had no son because Shōsatto and his offsprings actually defected to Korea in 1398. Before the recognition by the Chinese emperor, Ōōso was appointed as King of Sannan by the King of Chūzan.

Similarly, historian Wada Hisanori suspects that Ōōso was not a younger brother or cousin of King Shōsatto and that it was a made-up story to eliminate Chinese suspicion. Based on the assumption that by that time, Shō Hashi, the unifier of Okinawa Island, had already kept Sannan under his control, Wada claims that Ōōso was either a pseudonym of Shō Hashi or his puppet ruler.

The Chūzan Seikan (1650) and Sai Taku's edition of the Chūzan Seifu (1701) made no mention of Ōōso, suggesting that the name of Ōōso was not transmitted among the Okinawan society. Sai On's edition of the Chūzan Seifu (1725) drastically rewrote history. Having access to Chinese diplomatic records, he added the records of tributary missions sent under the name of Ōōso. Sai On dated Ōōso's death to 1414.

== Notes ==
Preceded by Shōsatto	King of Sannan; 1403–1414 (traditional dates)	Succeeded by Taromai
