= Kumemura =

Location of Ryukyu Kingdom bureaucracy

Coordinates: 26.21744°N 127.675831°E

Kumemura (久米村; Okinawan: Kuninda; Middle Chinese: Kjú-méi ts'won) was an Okinawan community of scholars, bureaucrats, and diplomats in the port city of Naha near the royal capital of Shuri, which was a center of culture and learning during the time of the Ryukyu Kingdom. The people of Kumemura, traditionally believed to all be descendants of the Chinese immigrants who first settled there in 1392, came to form an important and aristocratic class of scholar-bureaucrats, the yukatchu, who dominated the royal bureaucracy, and served as government officials at home, and as diplomats in relations with China, Japan, and others.

The community's special function came to an end in 1879, with Okinawa's formal annexation to Japan, and it has since been geographically absorbed into the prefectural capital of Naha; the area is now known simply as Kume. However, its association with scholarship and culture, or at least with China, remains. It is said that there remains an expectation among Okinawans that people from Kume remain more Chinese, or at least different, from the other people of the islands.

== History ==
According to traditional accounts, the community was founded in 1392 when a number of Chinese bureaucrats and craftsmen, under orders from the Ming Chinese Imperial government, traveled to Okinawa from Fujian and settled there. Historian Takashi Uezato, however, writes that it is unknown exactly when the community was established. He points out that, in any case, Chinese communities in Ryukyu would have grown in the 14th-15th centuries as communities along the south China coast moved southward, and trade expanded between that region and Ryukyu.

The three kingdoms of Ryukyu, which would be united within the next thirty years after the traditional date of Kumemura's founding, like many other states in the region at the time, were tributary states in the Chinese world order; Chinese culture, and its political and economic structures, were seen as the very definition of civilization and modernity, a view cultivated by the Chinese imperial government throughout much of its history. Thus, even though these Chinese immigrants were hardly more than ordinary citizens back home in Fujian, they were regarded by their government which sent them, and by the Ryukyuans who welcomed them, as cultural envoys, bringing civilization to a lesser nation.

The immigrants were given tax-free lands on which to build their homes, the community was granted a rice stipend from the government to help support it, and the people of Kumemura soon came to bear great status and prestige in the royal government, though the community as a whole functioned somewhat independently of any of the three kingdoms. All three kingdoms cultivated diplomatic and trade relationships with members of Kumemura's intercultural and maritime oriented community. These conditions would remain unchanged for several centuries, as Kumemura grew more established in its importance and influence.

On Okinawa, as in most pre-modern societies, literacy was rare; the people of Kumemura, literate and fluent in the Chinese language and educated in the Chinese classics, thus represented a close community of most of the country's most educated people. The original immigrants, and later their descendants, taught the Chinese language and administrative methods and structures, to Ryukyuan officials and others. Many were also considered experts in a variety of skills, such as astronomy, navigation, geomancy, shipbuilding, and the production of ink and paper.

By the middle of the 15th century, the community was enclosed within earthen walls, and consisted of over 100 homes inhabited by not only Chinese immigrants (and their descendants) but Koreans as well. No remains of the earthen walls have been found, however.

=== Student exchange and education ===
Children in Kumemura began their formal studies at the age of five, and would travel to the palace at Shuri for a formal audience at the age of 15. At this point they would be formally added to the register of yukatchu scholar-bureaucrats and could begin their government careers.

One of the defining features of the scholar community at Kumemura, and its relationship with China was the system by which students and scholars of Kumemura spent periods in Fuzhou, both as students and as members of tributary missions. Most if not all students and scholar-bureaucrats spent at least a few years of their lives studying in Fuzhou; a few traveled to Beijing, and beginning in the 17th century, some studied in Japan, in Kagoshima. Only a few hundred Ryukyuans were ever resident in Fuzhou at a time, and only eight at the imperial university in Beijing, where they were allowed to stay for three years, or up to eight in exceptional circumstances.

Education inevitably led to either Chinese Imperial examinations taken in Beijing, or a less rigorous set of examinations underwent in Shuri. As in China, these exams were the gateway to placement in the government bureaucracy. In addition to serving as bureaucrats in Shuri, many took positions as teachers in Kumemura or diplomats.

=== Confucianism ===
The area encompassing Kumemura and nearby Naha and Shuri was, metaphorically, a cultural island. Descendants of the original Chinese immigrants studied alongside Ryukyuan youths, and any number of rites, rituals, and celebrations, along with a myriad of other elements of Chinese culture, were largely unknown outside of this area.

This generated something of a schism within the country, as Chinese culture came to dominate life in the region immediately around the capital, while the rest of the kingdom remained devoted to traditional, native beliefs and ways of life. As all the government bureaucrats and officials came from Kumemura and Shuri, policies came to be increasingly guided by Confucian values and ideas, particularly under Shō Shōken and Sai On, widely considered the two most influential officials in the kingdom's history.

A Confucian temple was gifted to the community by the Chinese Kangxi Emperor in 1671, and extensive efforts were made by Shō Shōken and others to turn the country into one heavily based on Confucian guidelines. Among Shō Shōken's many reforms was a series of attempts to root out native animistic rituals, particularly those involving the king. Native beliefs were seen as primitive, uncivilized, and potentially embarrassing in the eyes of both China and Japan. Thus, the system of noro priestesses was forcibly reduced in prominence, and many royal rituals were made to be performed at the Confucian temple, in a more Chinese manner, or were all but eliminated entirely, transformed into mere gestures by which junior officials would officially represent the king in performing the rituals.

== Medieval geography ==
For much of the medieval period (c. 1390s to 1609), the port city of Naha was located on a small island called Ukishima, connected to the mainland of Okinawa Island by a narrow causeway called chōkōtei (長虹堤, lit. "long rainbow embankment"); the center of the island was dominated by the walled community of Kumemura. A main thoroughfare, Kume Ōdōri (久米大通り) ran across the island from southeast to northwest; the Taoist Tensonbyō temple lay at the north end of the street, while a pair of Tenpigū shrines devoted to Tenpi, Taoist deity of the sea, lay at the south end of the road.

=== Under Satsuma ===
During the period when Ryukyu was controlled by the Shimazu clan of Japan (1603-1868), the people of Kumemura came to serve an even more direct role in government and in diplomacy, at least initially. Ryukyu's strong connections to China were crucial for Japan, and were contingent upon China's ignorance of Ryukyu's subordination. Thus, the people of Kumemura served not only in the royal government, and as diplomats, but also as cultural agents. The Ryukyuan people were forbidden to speak Japanese, to wear Japanese clothes, or, in a variety of other ways, to reveal the Japanese influence upon them. Thus, the magistrate of the Kumemura community took on an unofficial role comparable to a minister of education, and the Ryukyuan people, even more so than before, were exposed to a campaign of both passive and active Sinicization.

The fall of the Ming dynasty in 1644 to the Manchu Qing dynasty, however, brought with it a cultural dilemma for the people of Kumemura who, though many generations removed from their Chinese ancestors, still felt very close ties to that country. The new Manchu government demanded that all Chinese subjects adopt certain Manchu customs and dress, including the wearing of the queue. Though those in Kumemura still considered themselves Ryukyuans after a fashion, they refused to follow these orders, and adopted manners and dress more in line with native Ryukyuan traditions.

The kingdom's development was inevitably affected quite profoundly by policies imposed by Satsuma, and by the reforms instituted by Sai On, Shō Shōken and others. Though the overall economic prosperity of Ryukyu in this period remains a subject of debate among historians, the kingdom did develop economically in some ways. The anji of Shuri and the yukatchu of Kumemura developed into a semi-wealthy middle class, the economic gap between those in the cities and those in the countryside grew, as did the cities themselves. In 1653, the government forbade anyone from moving their residence to one of the major cities, and imposed a number of sumptuary laws intended to reduce gratuitous spending. The bureaucratic elite may have been more wealthy than the Ryukyuan peasantry, but they were by most scholarly accounts still relatively poor compared to the aristocrats in China and Japan.

Over the course of this period, the aristocratic class of Shuri, the anji, gained influence and power, and eclipsed Kumemura. In 1729, the government put an end to the rice stipends which had supported the people of Kumemura since the community's founding, paying it instead to the people of Shuri. Around 1801, young men from Shuri began to be sent abroad to study in Fuzhou and Beijing, breaking the monopoly on Chinese scholarship held by Kumemura for roughly four centuries. A variety of government positions came to be open only to those living in Shuri, and of anji lineage. Allowances were made for men of Kumemura to formally change their residence to the capital, and thus gaining the same opportunities offered those originally from Shuri, but while this benefited individual scholar-bureaucrats, on the whole it only served to accelerate the decline of Kumemura's prestige and power as its formerly uniquely important role in the country's government, education and culture came to be shared, or even taken over, by Shuri. Protests were organized at the time, but had very little impact.

These developments were the metaphorical nails in the coffin of the Kumemura community, which had relied heavily on rice stipends from the government, and on its monopoly on its unique role in government. For centuries, the people had devoted themselves to scholarly pursuits, not to economic production. Shō Shōken attempted to alleviate this problem somewhat, curtailing production of crafts in the countryside and reserving this production for the people of Kumemura and other towns. Some townsmen were encouraged to leave the towns for the countryside, to pursue lives as artisans, without any formal loss of status.

In 1879, the Kingdom was dissolved, and Ryukyu became formally annexed to Japan as Okinawa Prefecture. Kumemura, bearing close ties to China, became a center for anti-Japanese sentiment, and many members of the community fled to China, both due to a distaste for the idea of joining Japan and fear of Chinese reprisals against Ryukyu for the annexation.

At the same time, as part of the wide-reaching reforms of the Meiji Restoration, a public school system was established across Japan. Though education was meant to be uniform across the country, exceptions were made in Okinawa, as they were for most Meiji era policies, which were more gradually introduced. Academies were established in Shuri and Kumemura, and the curriculum based on the Chinese classics was maintained for a time. By the beginning of the 20th century, it is said that Kumemura's traditional scholarship had disappeared.

== Prominent Kumemura from the 36 families ==
- Thirty-six families from Min
- Jana Ueekata
- Sai Taku
- Sai On
- Takamine Tokumei
- Tei Junsoku
- Keiichi Inamine, Governor of Okinawa Prefecture, his ancestors had the surname of Mao
- Hirokazu Nakaima, Governor of Okinawa Prefecture, Nakaima's Chinese ancestors had the surname of Cai.
