= Nanzan Castle =

Coordinates: 26.127502°N 127.690224°E

Nanzan Castle 島尻大里城
- Itoman, Okinawa
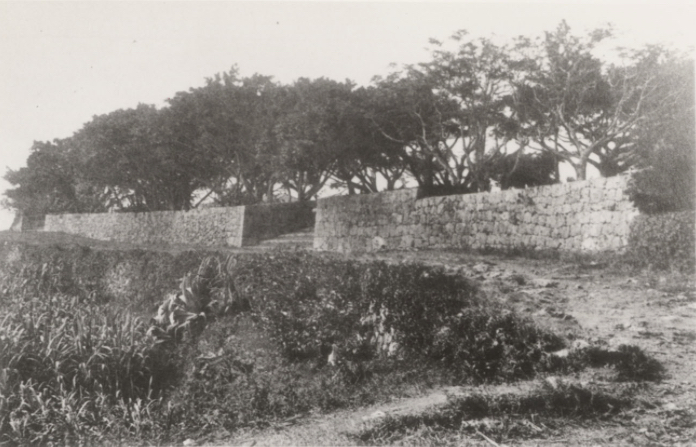
- Nanzan Castle before 1945

Site information
- Type: Gusuku
- Controlled by: Nanzan (1314-1429); Chūzan (1429); Ryūkyū Kingdom (1429–1879); Empire of Japan (1879–1945); United States Military Government of the Ryukyu Islands(1945-1950); United States Civil Administration of the Ryukyu Islands(1950-1972); Japan(1972-present)
- Open to the public: yes
- Condition: Ruins

Location

Site history
- Built: early 14th century
- Built by: Ōzato family
- In use: early 14th century – 1429
- Materials: Ryukyuan limestone, wood
- Demolished: 1429 invasion of Nanzan
- Battles/wars: Invasion of Nanzan (1429)

Garrison information
- Occupants: Kings of Nanzan

Nanzan Castle (南山城, Nanzan jō; Okinawan: Nanzan Gushiku), officially Shimajiri-Ōzato Castle (島尻大里城, Shimajiri-Ōzato jō; Okinawan: Shimajiri-Ufuzatu Gushiku), is a Ryūkyūan gusuku and was the largest in, and capital of, Nanzan until 1429. It is in ruins, and is located in Itoman.

== History ==
Nanzan Castle was built in the early 14th century, and became capital of Nanzan in 1314 when the Lord of Ōzato, Ōzato Ofusato, broke away from the chieftain Tamagusuku at Urasoe Castle. It sat on a hill near the fishing town of Itoman and the farming village of Ōzato. There was a small inlet at the bottom of the hill that allowed merchant ships to trade directly with the castle. The strategic location of the castle allowed Nanzan to compete with Chūzan and outlive Hokuzan, but during a succession dispute in 1429 following the death of the last King of Nanzan, Ōzato Taromai, the army of Chūzan captured the castle. In the 1950s, a primary school was built within the inner court of the castle.
