= Taromai =

Taromai 他魯毎

King of Sannan
- Reign: 1414–1429 (traditional dates)
- Predecessor: Ōōso
- Died: 1429 (traditional date)

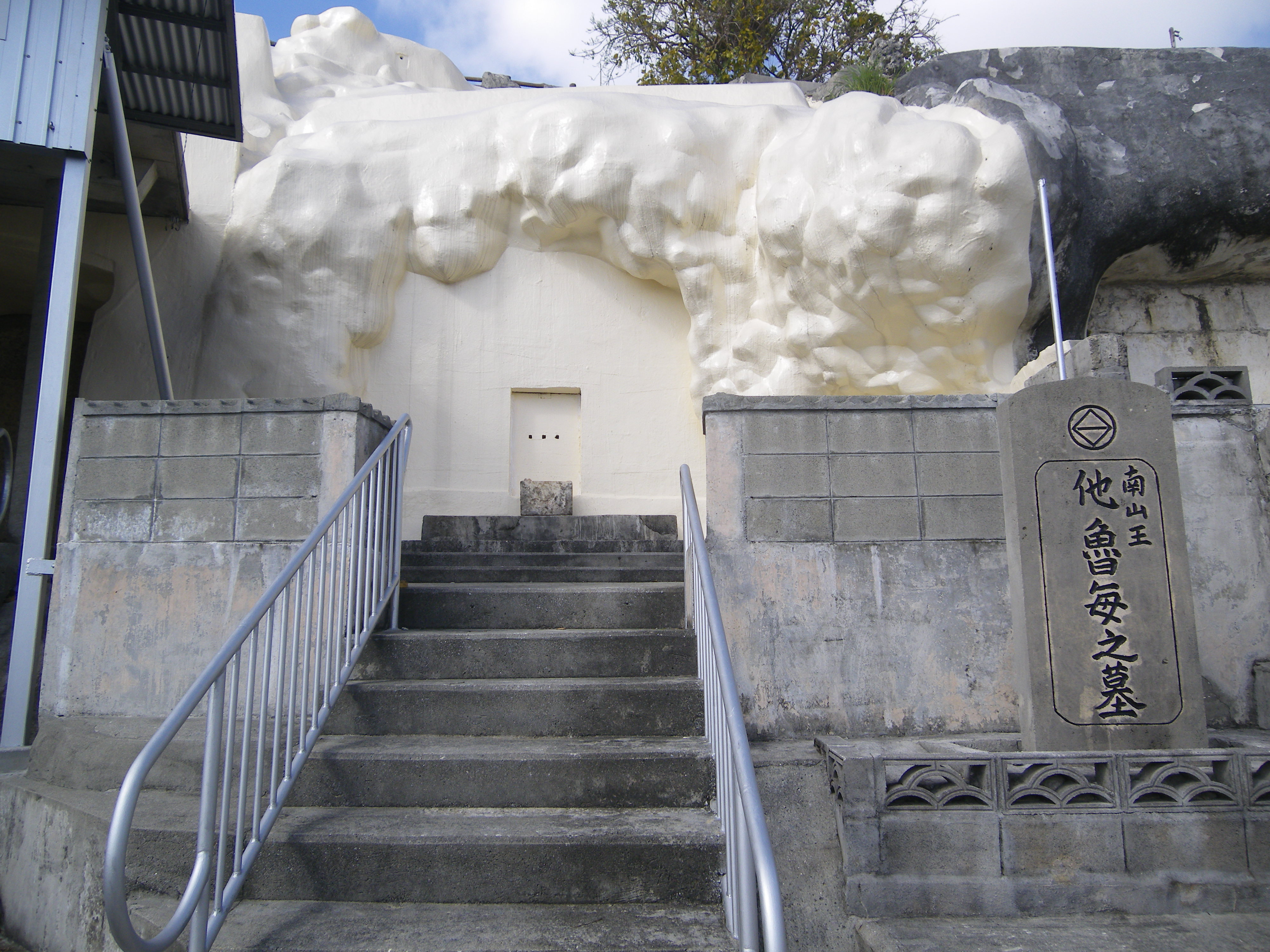

Taromai (他魯毎), read variously as Tarumoi and Tarumī, was a local ruler of Okinawa Island, who was given the title of King of Sannan. He first contacted the Chinese emperor in 1415, claiming himself to be an heir to King Ōōso, without clearly specifying his blood relationship with the former king. He claimed that Ōōso was killed by his elder brother Tabuchi, who had in turn been killed by local chiefs, in favor of Crown Prince Taromai. This report was highly unusual because Okinawans routinely deceived the Chinese into thinking that the throne was normally succeeded from the father to the son. Historian Dana Masayuki raises the possibility that it was a cover story for Taromai's illegitimate seizure of power. His last contact was of 1429. The Chinese records suggest that the Chinese had no information on when and how the king disappeared. Because the King of Chūzan continued tributary missions, the Chinese later speculated that the Kings of Sannan and Sanhoku had been removed by the King of Chūzan.

Taromai was quite unusual for Okinawan rulers in Chinese records, in that the name appears to represent a genuine Okinawan given name: Taru-mi. Tarū was a common given name while -mi (<*omopi) was a suffix commonly used by ruling elites.

Historian Wada Hisanori notes that the Rekidai Hōan contains diplomatic documents supposedly sent by Taromai, King of Sannan. Wada speculates that Shō Hashi, the unifier of Okinawa Island, had already kept Sannan under his control. According to his hypothesis, Taromai was the eldest son of Shō Hashi while Ōōso was either a pseudonym of Shō Hashi or his puppet ruler. Shō Hashi gave southern Okinawa to the first son while the rule of northern Okinawa was left to his second son Shō Chū.

Okinawans later identified the King of Sannan as the Aji (local ruler) of Ōzato but had no information on how many rulers had assumed the title. Because Taromai was the last known King of Sannan, a logical consequence was that the Aji of Ōzato who was annihilated by Shō Hashi was Taromai. However, neither the Chūzan Seikan (1650) nor Sai Taku's edition of the Chūzan Seifu (1701) identified the Aji of Ōzato in question as such.

According to the Chūzan Seikan (1650), the unnamed King of Sannan lost popular support. Shō Hashi, then the Aji of Sashiki, overthrew the King of Sannan and became King of Sannan himself. The King of Sannan then replaced Bunei as King of Chūzan in 1421. Shō Hashi finally overthrew the King of Sanhoku in 1422, unifying Okinawa Island. The Chūzan Seikan did not date Shō Hashi's overthrow of the King of Sannan. Sai Taku's edition of the Chūzan Seifu (1701) generally followed the Chūzan Seikan.

Sai On's edition of Chūzan Seifu (1725) is drastically different from these two books. Having access to Chinese diplomatic records, Sai On added the records of tributary missions sent under the name of King Taromai. The last king was now identified as Taromai. More importantly, Sai On changed the date of the King of Sannan's downfall to 1429, postdating Shō Hashi's conquest of the King of Chūzan in 1406 and that of the King of Sanhoku in 1416. Sai On naïvely inferred that the King of Sannan was removed immediately after the last tributary mission of 1429.

Sai On's attempt to resolve contradictions between the traditional Okinawan narrative and Chinese sources was a source of another inconsistency. The Chūzan Seikan (1650) suggested that the Aji of Shimasoe-Ōzato had been the King of Sannan. Because Sashiki, Shō Hashi's stronghold, neighbored Shimasoe-Ōzato, his conquest must have started with the overthrow of the Aji of Shimasoe-Ōzato. Even though Sai On put Shō Hashi's conquest of the King of Sannan at the final phase of his conquest, he somehow kept the episode of Shō Hashi's takeover of the Aji of Ōzato in his early years. To resolve the new contradiction, Sai On had to re-identify the Aji of Ōzato in question as the Aji of Shimasoe-Ōzato while the King of Sannan, annihilated supposedly much later, was identified as the Aji of Shimajiri-Ōzato.

Preceded by Ōōso	King of Sannan; 1414–1429 (traditional dates)	Succeeded by None
