= Sai Taku =

Ryukyuan aristocrat and bureaucrat

- 蔡 鐸

Head of Kumemura
- In office 1692–1725

Personal details
- Born: January 4, 1645 Kumemura, Ryukyu Kingdom
- Died: January 29, 1725 (aged 80) Ryukyu Kingdom
- Childhood name: Umituku (思徳)
- Japanese name: Shitahaku Tenshō (志多伯 天将)
- Rank: Ueekata

Sai Taku (蔡 鐸; January 4, 1645 – January 29, 1725), also known by his Japanese-style name Shitahaku Ueekata Tenshō (志多伯 親方 天将), was a Ryukyuan aristocrat and bureaucrat in the royal government of the Ryūkyū Kingdom.

Sai Taku was born in Kumemura on January 4, 1645. He descended from Cai Xiang, a famous polymath of the Song dynasty. He took part in the compilation of Rekidai Hōan, an official compilation of diplomatic documents of the royal government. In 1697, he was ordered to translate the Chūzan Seikan (中山世鑑), an official history book, into Chinese, and renamed it Chūzan Seifu (中山世譜).

Sai Taku was also known for his poetry, many of which were included in his poetry collection. He had two sons, Sai En (蔡淵) and Sai On (蔡温).
