= Sai On =

Ryukyuan bureaucrat (1682–1762)

- 蔡 温
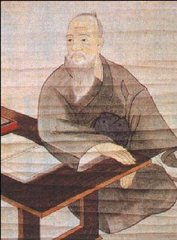

Sanshikan of Ryukyu
- In office 1728–1752
- Preceded by: Nago Ryōi
- Succeeded by: Kochinda Chōei

Kokushi of Ryukyu
- In office 1712–1762

Personal details
- Born: October 25, 1682 Kumemura, Ryūkyū Kingdom
- Died: January 23, 1762 (aged 79) Ryūkyū Kingdom
- Parent(s): Sai Taku (father); Magozei (真呉瑞, mother)
- Childhood name: Kamado (蒲戸)
- Japanese name: Gushichan Bunjaku (具志頭 文若)
- Rank: Ueekata

Sai On (蔡温) (1682–1762), or Cai Wen in Chinese, also known as Gushi-chan Bunjaku (具志頭 文若, lit. Bunjaku, head of Gushi), was a scholar-bureaucrat official of the Ryūkyū Kingdom, serving as regent, instructor, and advisor to King Shō Kei. He is renowned for the many reforms he initiated and oversaw, and is among the most famous figures in Okinawan history. He edited Chūzan Seifu, a rewrite of Chūzan Seikan by his father Sai Taku.

== Life and career ==
Sai On was born in Kumemura, the village within the major port city of Naha which served as the chief center of classical Chinese learning in Okinawa, and the source of the vast majority of the scholar-bureaucrats who were raised to serve in the administration of the kingdom. His father had likewise been a scholar-bureaucrat of Kumemura, educated in the Confucian classics, and had served on several tribute missions to China. Sai On's father wrote the Chūzan Seifu by rewriting the Chūzan Seikan in 1701. Unlike Chūzan Seikan, which was written in Japanese Kanbun, Chūzan Seifu is written in Classical Chinese. Sai On edited Chūzan Seifu in 1724, and it is believed that this was to give the work a pro-Chinese point of view.

At the age of 27, Sai On traveled to Guangzhou in China, where he studied economics, geography, and political administration alongside the more traditional Chinese classics. Upon returning from China, Sai On was made instructor to the Crown Prince; upon the prince's accession to the throne as King Shō Kei in 1713, Sai On was elevated in position and power, and led the investiture mission to China in 1716. In 1728, he became a member of the Sanshikan, the Council of Three chief royal advisors. Though Sai On was not of royal blood and so could not be named Sessei (a post which historian George Kerr translates as "prime minister"), reorganizations were undertaken within the government allowing Sai On extensive authority and powers. Under his guidance, a number of land reforms were put into place, including the reclamation of land for agriculture, relocation and establishment of settlements, irrigation, flood control, and the planting of trees. In a series of reforms very similar to those implemented in Japan around the same time, strict limitations were placed on farmers moving to the cities, and on the amount of craft work, such as woodworking and metalworking, which farmers were permitted to do. Thus, agricultural production was intensified and made more efficient while artisans were focused in the twin cities of Naha and Shuri. Within a few years of the beginning of the implementation of Sai On's economic reforms and construction, reclamation and conservation projects, the kingdom was producing more than ever before.

In addition, the anji, hereditary lords of territories throughout the kingdom, were given stipends from the government in the form of rice, beginning in 1723. This tied them closer to the central government and also safeguarded to some extent their economic well-being, as they would no longer need to rely solely on inheritance for their relative wealth. Aristocrats were also encouraged to become artisans, with no loss of court rank or status, and in 1734, taxes upon artisans in the cities were eliminated, further encouraging an expansion of craft production. In addition, various forms of official government recognition for exemplary artisans, artists, and performers were introduced.

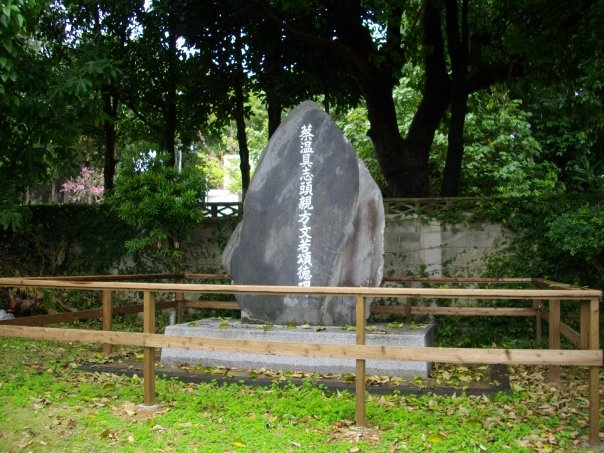
Stele dedicated to Sai On, at the Shiseibyō Confucian temple in Naha.

Okinawa's demand for wood outstripped the ability of the forests to renew themselves on their own, naturally, and the combination of deforestation and rainy weather including regular typhoon seasons led to extensive erosion and landslides. Sai On is particularly known for the forestry and soil conservation efforts undertaken under his guidance to combat these problems. Particular trees and sections of forest throughout the islands are still today called "Sai On pines" (蔡温松, Sai On matsu/Sē Un machi; 蔡温並木, Sai On namiki), and his essays on the subject of forestry and conservation remained so valued that the post-war United States Civil Administration of the Ryukyu Islands translated, published, and distributed them abroad in 1952. In addition to these essays, Sai On produced a number of other documents, including a handbook for administrative officials in the provinces entitled Yomui-kan, and Ryokōnin Kokoroe (旅行人心得), or "Travelers' Advice", a guide for Okinawans abroad in China to help them in obscuring from the Chinese the relationship between Okinawa and Japan's Satsuma Domain.

A rival government faction rose up against Sai On in 1734, accusing him of being too pro-Chinese, led by a pair of scholar-bureaucrats, Heshikiya Chōbin and Tomoyose Anjō. Before any plots against Sai On could be executed, however, Chōbin and fourteen others were arrested and put to death.

Sai On retired from his ministerial post in 1752, the year after Shō Kei's death, but remained influential until his own death at the age of 79 in 1761.

== Notes and references ==
Political offices
Preceded by Nago Ryōi	Sanshikan of Ryukyu; 1728 - 1752	Succeeded by Kochinda Chōei
