= List of mergers in Okinawa Prefecture =

This is a list of mergers in Okinawa Prefecture, Japan since the Heisei era.

== Mergers from April 1, 1999 to Present ==
- On April 1, 2002 – the villages of Gushikawa and Nakazato (both from Shimajiri District) were merged to create the town of Kumejima.
- On April 1, 2002 – the village of Tomigusuku was elevated to city status.
- On April 1, 2005 – the cities of Gushikawa and Ishikawa were merged with the towns of Katsuren and Yonashiro (both from Nakagami District) to create the city of Uruma. Prior to the merger, both Gushikawa and Ishikawa were forced to merge into one city because both cities were not making enough revenues for the prefecture.
- On October 1, 2005 – the city of Hirara was merged with the towns of Gusukube, Irabu and Shimoji, and the village of Ueno (all from Miyako District) to create the city of Miyakojima.
- On January 1, 2006 – the town of Kochinda, and the village of Gushikami (both from Shimajiri District) were merged to create the town of Yaese. (Merger Information Page)
- On January 1, 2006 – the town of Sashiki, and the villages of Chinen, Ōzato and Tamagusuku (all from Shimajiri District) were merged to create the city of Nanjō. (Merger Information Page)
