= List of cities in Okinawa Prefecture by population =

The following list sorts all cities (including towns and villages) in the Japanese prefecture of Okinawa with a population of more than 5,000 according to the 2020 Census. As of October 1, 2020, 26 places fulfill this criterion and are listed here. This list refers only to the population of individual cities, towns and villages within their defined limits, which does not include other municipalities or suburban areas within urban agglomerations.

== List ==
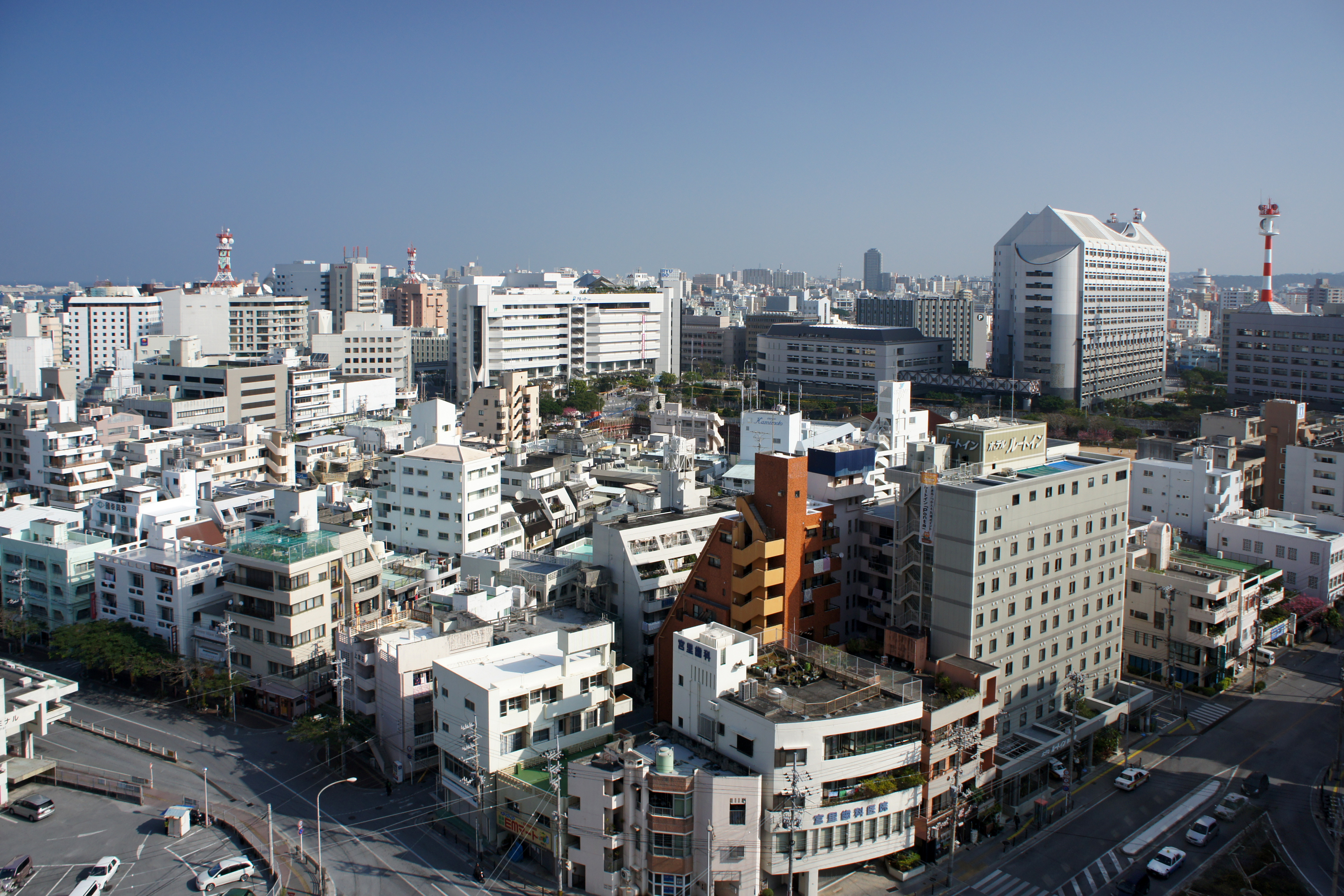
Naha

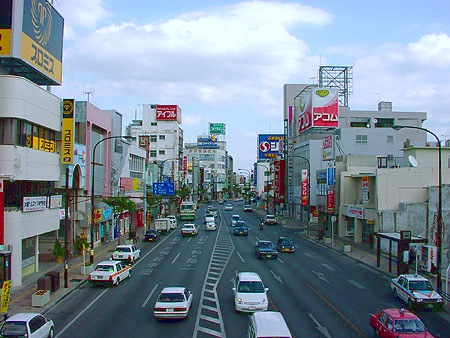
Okinawa

The following table lists the 26 cities, towns and villages in Okinawa with a population of at least 5,000 on October 1, 2020, according to the 2020 Census. The table also gives an overview of the evolution of the population since the 1995 census.

Rank	Name	Status	2020	2015	2010	2005	2000	1995
1	Naha (Nāfa)	City	317,832	319,435	315,954	312,393	301,032	301,890
2	Okinawa (Uchinā)	City	142,840	139,279	130,249	126,400	119,686	115,336
3	Uruma (Uruma)	City	125,406	118,898	116,979	113,535	109,992	105,228
4	Urasoe (Urashī)	City	115,741	114,232	110,351	106,049	102,734	96,002
5	Ginowan (Jinōn)	City	100,192	96,243	91,928	89,769	86,744	82,862
6	Tomigusuku (Tumigushiku)	City	64,640	61,119	57,261	52,516	50,198	45,253
7	Nago (Nagu)	City	63,564	61,674	60,231	59,463	56,606	53,955
8	Itoman (Ichuman)	City	61,025	58,547	57,320	55,816	54,974	53,498
9	Miyakojima (Nāku)	City	52,962	51,186	52,039	53,493	54,249	54,326
10	Ishigaki (Ishigachi)	City	47,675	47,564	46,922	45,183	43,302	41,777
11	Nanjō (Fēgushiku)	City	44,071	42,016	39,758	39,651	39,130	38,173
12	Yomitan (Yuntan)	Village	41,240	39,504	38,200	37,306	36,115	32,912
13	Haebaru (Fēbaru)	Town	40,458	37,502	35,244	33,537	32,099	30,249
14	Nishihara (Nishibaru)	Town	34,996	34,508	34,766	33,733	32,777	28,516
15	Yaese (Ēji)	Town	30,958	29,066	26,681	25,121	24,626	23,031
16	Chatan (Chatan)	Town	28,223	28,308	27,264	26,848	25,554	23,737
17	Nakagusuku (Nakagushiku)	Village	22,173	19,454	17,680	15,798	14,987	13,832
18	Yonabaru (Yunabaru)	Town	19,705	18,410	16,318	15,343	15,109	14,850
19	Kitanakagusuku (Nishinakagusiku)	Village	17,984	16,148	15,951	15,790	15,745	15,023
20	Kadena (Kadina)	Town	13,531	13,685	13,827	13,629	13,661	13,752
21	Motobu (Mutubu)	Town	12,543	13,536	13,870	14,383	14,522	14,718
22	Onna (Unna)	Village	10,885	10,652	10,144	9,635	9,064	8,685
23	Kin (Chin)	Town	10,828	11,232	11,066	10,619	10,106	9,911
24	Nakijin (Nachijin)	Village	8,904	9,531	9,257	9,476	9,492	9,486
25	Kumejima (Kumijima)	Town	7,201	7,755	8,519	9,177	9,359	9,819
26	Ginoza (Jinuza)	Village	5,837	5,597	5,331	5,042	4,749	4,651
