= Iha Shell Mound =

Iha Shell Midden
- 伊波貝塚 (Japanese)
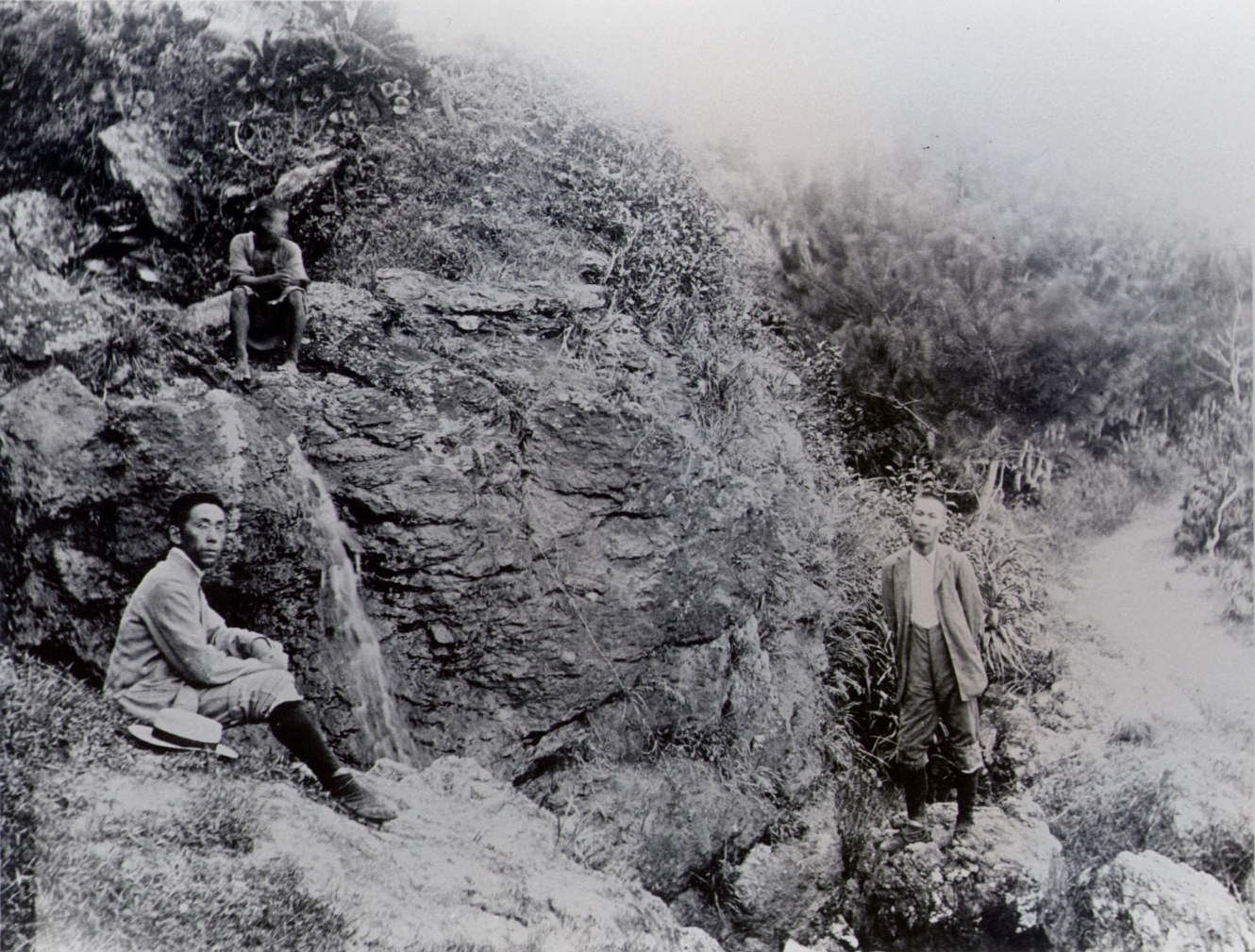
- Iha Shell Mound

- Iha Shell Midden Iha Shell Mound (Japan)
- Interactive map of Iha Shell Midden
- 26°25′14″N 127°49′15″E
- Type: shell midden
- Periods: Shellmidden
- Location: Uruma, Okinawa, Japan
- Region: Okinawa

Site notes
- Public access: Yes (no facilities at site)

The Iha Shell Mound (伊波貝塚, Iha Kaizuka) is an archaeological site with a shell mound and traces of a settlement located in the Ishikawa of the city of Uruma, Okinawa Prefecture, Japan. It was designated a National Historic Site in 1972.

== Overview ==
During the early to middle Jōmon period (approximately 4000 to 2500 BC), sea levels were five to six meters higher than at present, and the ambient temperature was also 2 deg C higher. During this period, the Ryukyu Islands was inhabited by the Jōmon people, many of whom lived in coastal settlements. The middens associated with such settlements contain bone, botanical material, mollusc shells, sherds, lithics, and other artifacts and ecofacts associated with the now-vanished inhabitants, and these features, provide a useful source into the diets and habits of Jōmon society.

The Iha shell midden site is located on a hill about 90 meters above sea level, facing the Ishikawa Plain on the east coast of central Okinawa Island. The site is located on a gently sloping area in the shade of a large limestone fault slope directly below the summit of the hill, with a shell layer scattered across an area measuring approximately 20 meters north-to-south and 160 meters east-to-west. The shell layer is approximately 60 centimetres (24 in) thick. Archaeological excavations have unearthed stone tools, pottery, bone artifacts, and shell artifacts, along with shellfish, fish, and animal bones, dating from the late Kaizuka period of Okinawan archaeology, coinciding with the late Jōmon period, c. 2500 – 1000 BC... The pottery in particular has been named "Iha Style," referencing this site as a typical style. The vessels are deep, bowl-shaped, with a slightly opening morning-glory-shaped mouth, four curved peaks and valleys, and a flat base. The distinctive patterns, consisting of continuous and sequential dots, are applied to the upper half of the vessel. This pottery is unique in form, and it is believed that this period marked the beginning of Okinawa's development of its own unique regional culture.

The site was first discovered in 1920 by Ōyama Kashiwa, confirming that Okinawa was settled by ancient peoples, and is one of only a few fully excavated shell mounds in Okinawa.

== See also ==
- List of Historic Sites of Japan (Okinawa)
