= Mount Ishikawa =

Mountain in Okinawa Prefecture, Japan

- 石川岳
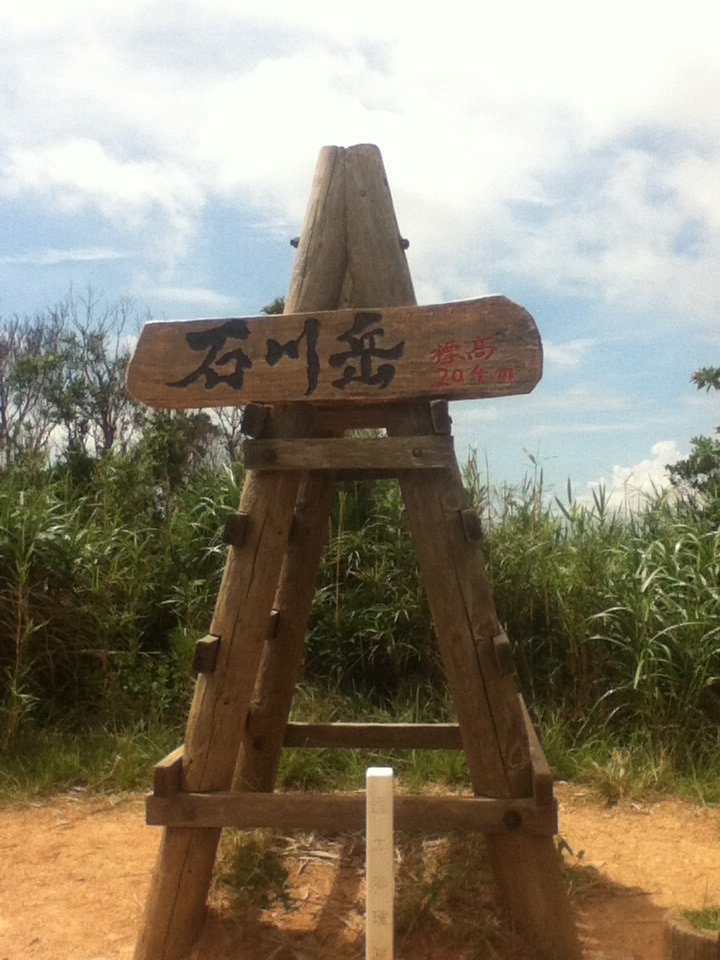
- Height marker on top of Mount Ishikawa

Highest point
- Elevation: 204 m (669 ft)
- Listing: List of mountains in Japan
- Coordinates: 26°26′58.3038″N 127°50′5.3412″E

Geography
- Location within Japan
- Location: Uruma, Okinawa Prefecture, Japan

Mount Ishikawa (石川岳, Ishikawa dake; Okinawan: Ishichā-daki) is a mountain in Uruma City, Okinawa. It is the highest point in the city, standing at 204 metres (669 ft). The former city of Ishikawa was named after this mountain and the nearby Ishikawa River. There are hiking trails to the summit, although some have become overgrown.
