= Camp McTureous =

Coordinates: 26°22′53″N 127°50′47″E

Camp McTureous (Japanese: キャンプ・マクトリアス Kyampu Makutoriasu) is part of Marine Corps Base Butler in Kawasaki and Nishihara, Uruma City, Okinawa, Japan.

Located in the western part of Agena district of Uruma City, Camp McTureous is equipped with family residential facilities, sports facilities and an elementary school.

The camp is named in honor of Robert M. McTureous, Jr., a Marine Private who was awarded the Medal of Honor for gallantry and sacrifice of life during the Battle of Okinawa.

== Education ==
William C. Bechtel Elementary School, of the Department of Defense Education Activity (DoDEA), is on base.
