= Kochinda, Okinawa =

Dissolved municipality in Okinawa prefecture, Japan

Kochinda (東風平町, Kochinda-chō; Okinawan: Kuchinda) was a town located in Shimajiri District, Okinawa Prefecture, Japan.

As of 2003, the town had an estimated population of 17,226 and the density of 1,164.71 persons per km^{2}. The total area is 14.79 km^{2}.

On January 1, 2006, Kochinda, along with the village of Gushikami (also from Shimajiri District), was merged to create the town of Yaese.

The Kochinda area is currently a place of change. Apartments are quickly replacing old businesses and old homes alike. This expansion is to lure people to the area from Naha and Haebaru with cheaper rent and quieter living. It is a small town with excellent schools, a city office, a grocery store, a few gas stations and a hardware store. The local area consists of farm fields, usually filled with sugar cane. It is quiet and clean.
