= Robert M. McTureous Jr. =

Robert Miller McTureous Jr.
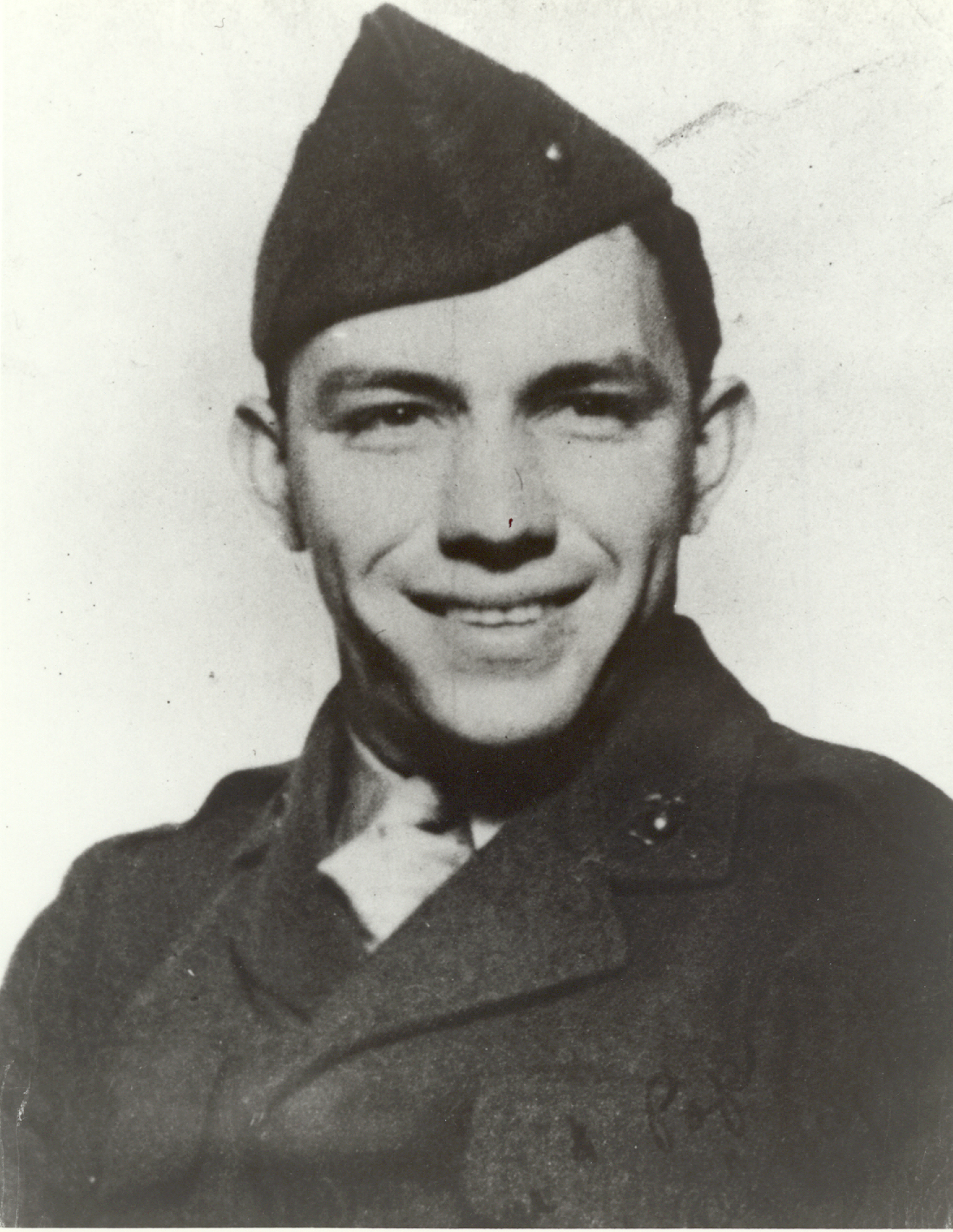
- Private Robert M. McTureous Jr.
- Born: March 26, 1924; Altoona, Florida, U.S.
- Died: June 11, 1945 (aged 21); USS Relief, off Okinawa, Japan
- Burial place: Glendale Cemetery, Umatilla, Florida
- Military career
- Allegiance: United States
- Branch: United States Marine Corps
- Service years: 1944–1945
- Rank: Private
- Units: 3rd Battalion, 29th Marines
- Conflicts: World War II: Battle of Okinawa †
- Awards: Medal of Honor; Purple Heart

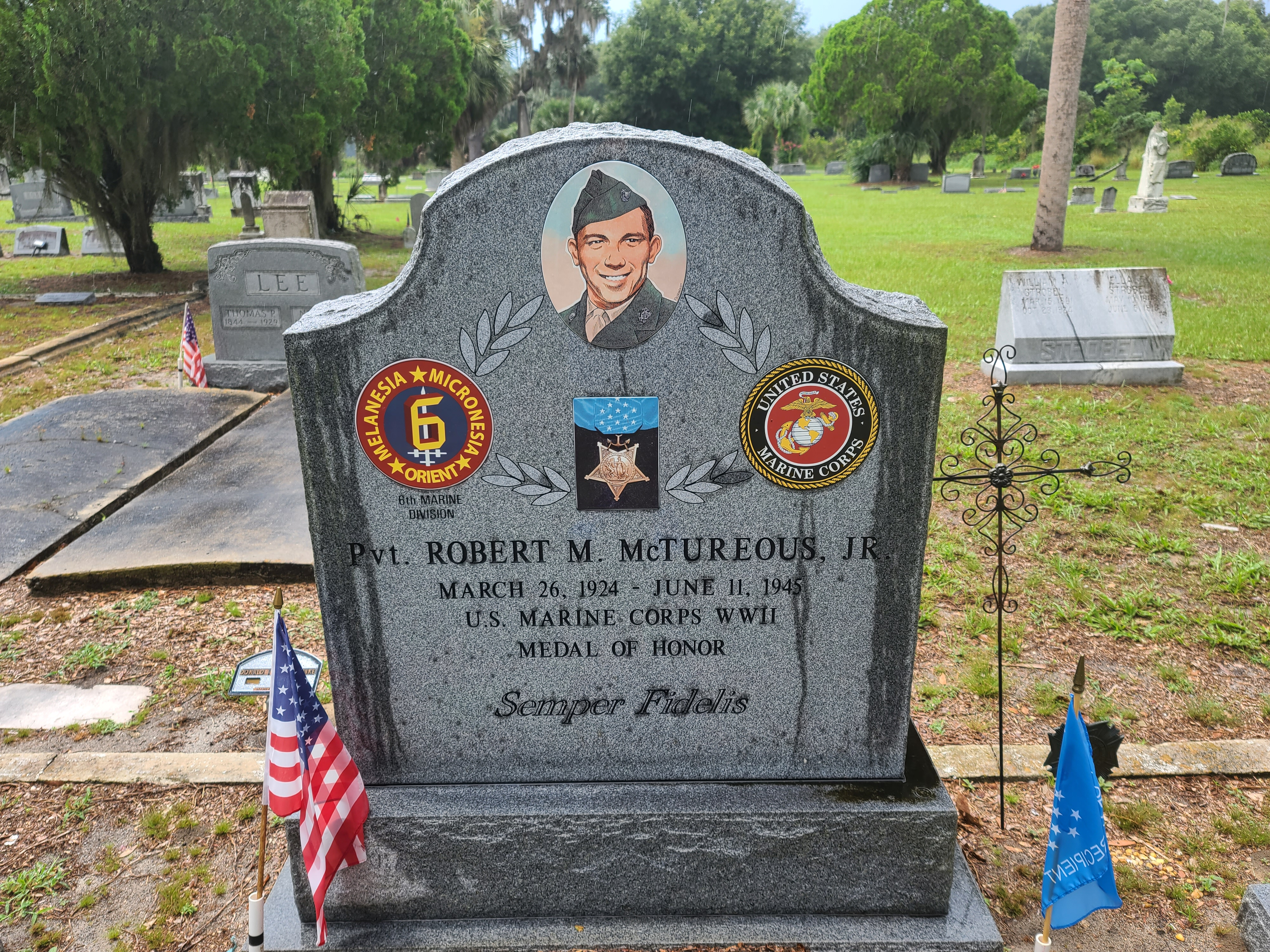
Grave of Pvt. Robert M. McTureous in Umatilla, Florida

Robert Miller McTureous Jr. (March 26, 1924 – June 11, 1945) was a United States Marine and a recipient of the United States military's highest decoration—the Medal of Honor—for his actions during the Battle of Okinawa in World War II.

== Early years ==
Robert Miller McTureous Jr. was born in Altoona, Florida, on March 26, 1924. He attended the primary schools of Altoona and graduated from high school at Umatilla, Florida, in 1941. He attended Brewton-Parker Institute at Mount Vernon, Georgia, for one year majoring in mathematics and was on the football and baseball teams. Also participating in softball, tennis and boxing, he also played the trombone, sang with the glee club and with the Double Quartet while at Brewton-Parker. His hobby was building model airplanes and, in 1942, he served as a Sunday School superintendent.

Returning to Altoona, he went to work as a night watchman in an orange-packing house at Umatilla for three months. Classified as 4-F by his local Draft Board, he looked for a better job so he could raise enough money to have surgery to correct his disability. Two operations were necessary and the young man underwent them always with the view of getting into the service when he was able. For his last eight months as a civilian, he worked as a rodman on a surveying team, engaged in road construction for the Florida State Highway Department. Examined again in August 1944, he was found fit and his induction into the United States Marine Corps followed on August 31, 1944.

== Marine Corps service ==
Private McTureous was sent to Marine Corps Recruit Depot Parris Island, South Carolina, for his recruit training, where he qualified as a sharpshooter with both the M1 Garand and the Browning Automatic Rifle by virtue of his 291 and 112 scores, respectively. In his General Classification Test, Pvt McTureous recorded a neat 132 while his Mechanical Aptitude Test was accomplished with a score of 131.

After a ten-day furlough, his only one, the new Marine reported to the 4th Training Battalion at Camp Lejeune, North Carolina, in November. One month later, he was assigned to the 46th Replacement Draft there, and in March 1945 that unit moved to Camp Pendleton, California. Pvt McTureous left the United States on March 11, 1945. En route to their destination, the Marines got a look at some of the places that had been making headlines since December 7, 1941. The first stop was Pearl Harbor and the next Eniwetok. They arrived and disembarked at Guam on March 31, 1945, and went into rigid combat training.

The island of Okinawa was invaded by U.S. Marines on April 1, 1945. When the need for replacements became apparent, Pvt McTureous' draft was sent. They arrived at Okinawa on May 15, 1945, and plunged into the fighting as a unit. On May 31, McTureous became attached to a permanent organization — rifle Company H, 3rd Battalion, 29th Marines (H/3/29) of the 6th Marine Division.

Seven days after joining H/3/29, Pvt McTureous took part in the capture of an important hill on Oroku Peninsula. The company suffered several casualties during the assault and enemy fire remained so heavy that the wounded Marines could not be evacuated. His platoon was temporarily pinned down. Realizing that the wounded must be removed to the rear and the heights must be taken, Pvt McTureous, on his own initiative, filled his pockets with grenades, jammed more of the explosives inside his jacket, and charged up the hill and into the enemy position where he knew the accurate rifle and machine-gun fire was coming from.

Running among the caves, he tossed grenades into the Japanese positions as Marine stretcher-bearers came forward to remove the wounded during the temporary lull caused by his furious one-man assault. His supply of hand grenades exhausted, he returned to his own lines, took on another load and returned to the caves, smashing his deadly charges into the enemy positions. Passing one cave, he was badly wounded in the stomach but instead of calling for help and risking other men being hit in attempts to rescue him, he stoically crawled 200 yards (180 m) to a sheltered place within the Marine lines before asking for aid. His actions completely silenced the Japanese, killing six of them and so badly disorganizing the remainder of the garrison, that his own company was enabled to occupy the hill and complete its mission. The earlier wounded were also evacuated to safety due to his self-sacrifice.

Pvt McTureous was evacuated to a hospital ship, the USS Relief, and given large quantities of blood in an attempt to save his life, but all efforts failed and on the morning of June 11, 1945 he died at sea. His remains were buried in the 2nd Marine Division Cemetery on Saipan. Later, in 1949, his remains were reinterred in Glendale Cemetery, Umatilla, Florida.

The Medal of Honor, the United States' highest military award, was presented to Pvt McTureous' parents at a ceremony in Altoona on August 7, 1946. The presentation was made by LtCol Alexander A. Vandegrift Jr., USMC, commanding officer, Marine Barracks, Naval Air Station, Jacksonville, Florida, the son of the Marine Corps' Commandant Alexander Vandegrift.

== Awards and honors ==

Medal of Honor
Purple Heart	Navy and Marine Corps Presidential Unit Citation	Marine Corps Good Conduct Medal
American Campaign Medal	Asiatic-Pacific Campaign Medal w/ 3/16" Bronze Star	World War II Victory Medal

=== Medal of Honor citation ===
The President of the United States takes pride in presenting the MEDAL OF HONOR posthumously to

Private Robert M. McTureous Jr.
United States Marine Corps

for service as set forth in the following citation:

For conspicuous gallantry and intrepidity at the risk of his life above and beyond the call of duty while serving with Company H, Third Battalion, Twenty-ninth Marines, Sixth Marine Division, in action against enemy Japanese forces on Okinawa in the Ryūkyū Chain, June 7, 1945. Alert and ready for any hostile counteraction following his company's seizure of an important hill-objective Private McTureous was quick to observe the plight of company stretcher-bearers who were suddenly assailed by slashing machine-gun fire as they attempted to evacuate wounded at the rear of the nearby won position. Determined to prevent further casualties, he quickly filled his shirt with hand grenades and charged the enemy-occupied caves from which the concentrated barrage was emanating. Coolly disregarding all personal danger as he waged his furious one-man assault, he smashed grenades into the cave entrances, thereby diverting the heaviest fire from the stretcher-bearers to his own person and, resolutely returning to his own lines under a blanketing hail of rifle and Machine-gun fire to replenish his supply of grenades, dauntlessly continued his systematic reduction of Japanese strength until he himself sustained serious wounds after silencing a large number of the hostile guns. Aware of his own critical condition and unwilling to further endanger the lives of his comrades, he stoically crawled a distance of two hundred yards to a sheltered position within friendly lines before calling for aid. By his fearless initiative and bold tactics, Private McTureous had succeeded in neutralizing the enemy fire, killing six of the Japanese and effectively disorganizing the remainder of the savagely defending garrison. His outstanding valor and heroic spirit of self-sacrifice during a critical stage of operations reflect the highest credit upon himself and the United States Naval Service. He gallantly gave his life for his country.

/S/ Harry S. Truman

=== Posthumous honors ===
In recognition of Pvt McTureous's heroic actions on Okinawa, a Marine Corps' base on Okinawa, Camp McTureous, is named in his honor. His boyhood home has been turned into a museum named for him in Altoona, Florida.

== See also ==
- List of Medal of Honor recipients
