= Yuken Teruya =

Japanese visual artist (born 1973)

- 照屋勇賢
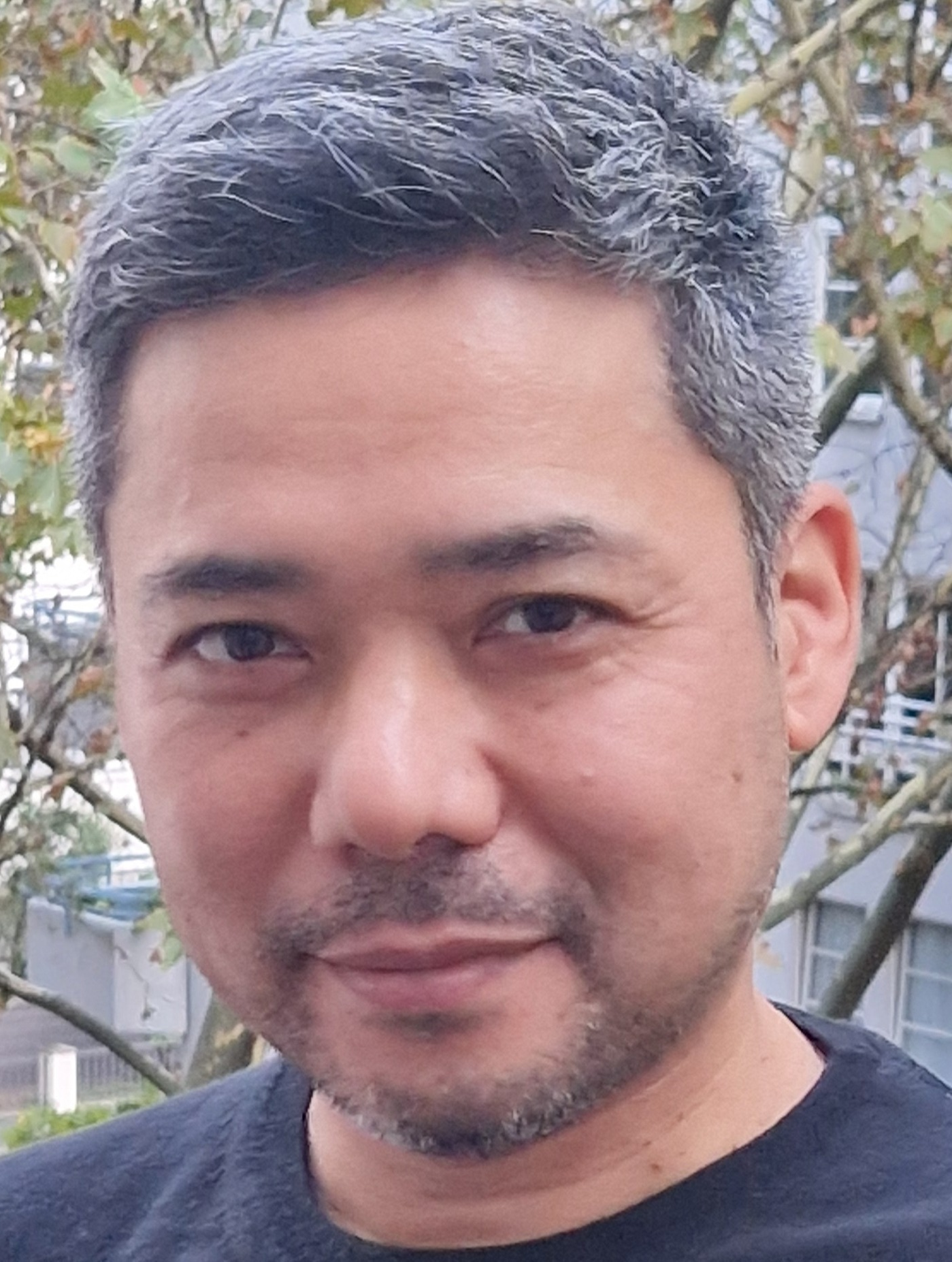
- Born: 1973 (age 52–53); Haebaru, Okinawa, Japan
- Education: School of Visual Arts (MFA), Maryland Institute College of Art (post-bacc), Tama Art University (BFA)
- Website: www.yukenteruyastudio.com

Yuken Teruya (Japanese: 照屋 勇賢, romanized: Teruya Yūken; born 1973) is a Japanese kirigami artist. He is one of the most representative and most successful artists in a generation of Japanese artists born in the 1970s, who came of age amidst the disasters and economic decline of Japan during the 1990s. He lives in New York City and Berlin.

== Biography ==
Teruya was born in 1973 in Haebaru, Okinawa. He received a BFA degree at Tama Art University in 1996, a post baccalaureate degree at Maryland Institute College of Art in 1999, and a MFA degree at the School of Visual Arts in New York City in 2001.

Conscious of being an outsider and minority in Japan, he has pioneered a transnational and global career that took him for twenty years to New York before expanding to Berlin in 2018. If what impressed Teruya about New York was the constant struggle for "identity" and recognition as a minority and immigrant, and the democratic energy for equal rights that this could still generate, in Berlin, he has been most swayed by the exuberant carnivalesque nature of political assertion – parades of dance and protest led by DJs on trucks – and by the expansive time the place allows for debating ideas and alternatives among artist and activist friends. Having faced censorship in Japan for some of his works that touch upon the American occupation of Okinawa, and Japan's quiescence, he has been liberated by the German environment to embrace participative forms, that now take the shape of video works and massive scale installations. The space and time of the city is also a great quality, after working more as a commercial gallery artist in New York, where he still maintains a studio.

== Works ==
As a transnational Okinawan artist, Teruya has developed a body of work that examines Okinawan identity politics. His projects often utilize ephemeral forms to address historical themes and political issues, incorporating elements of humor and pathos.

Teruya often puts a high emphasis on craft and recycling traditional techniques. They had matured in – or, more often, moved away from – a Japan whose political confidence had been shattered, where young people faced a "no future" with precarious and marginalised place in the economy, turned off by nationalist gloom and insularity in the face of American dominance and the rise of China, and the increasing tendency of youth to escape into private self-isolating fantasy and obsession.

Yuken Teruya filters his observations of contemporary life and his native Okinawa into elegant, evocative mixed-media installations, sculptures, and public art projects that speak of the shaping forces of consumerism, politics, and history. The delicacy and beauty of his works belie their critical edge.

Using humble materials, like toilet paper roles and pizza boxes, he crafts visions that reveal the disharmony between human beings and nature, and among ourselves. In You-I, You-I (2002–05), for example, he re-worked the patterning on Okinawa's traditional kimono, interrupting images of indigenous flora and fauna with those of U.S. fighter jets and paratroopers, representing American and Japanese colonization. Trees recur throughout Teruya's works. He has cut them out of toilet paper rolls and shopping bags, materials they were destroyed to create, symbolic of our over-abundant consumer culture and its disregard for nature." - Artsy.net

== Exhibitions ==
Teruya's work was shown at the Guggenheim New York, the Biennale of Sydney, Greater New York 2005 at MoMA PS.1, Shanghai Biennale, Saatchi Gallery London, Odin, Yokohama Triennale, the US Ambassador's House, Tokyo, 21st Century Museum of Contemporary Art, Kanazawa, Japan and in various other exhibitions in the United States, Europe and Asia.

== Significance ==
Teruya's work is regarded as influential in the art world and beyond. While Artfacts.net ranks him as one of the top 100 artists from Japan, he also had collaborations with The New York Times and other newspapers and his work is featured on academic literature on Okinawa

In 2023, Teruya's You-I, You-I was the first work of art by a living Okinawan artist to be acquired by the British Museum.

== Public collections ==
- British Museum, London, UK
- Guggenheim Museum, New York, US
- Museum of Modern Art, New York, US
- Dai-Ichi Seimei Museum, Tokyo, Japan
- Seattle Art Museum, Seattle, Washington, US
- Daimler Art Collection, Berlin, Germany
- Honolulu Museum of Art, Honolulu, Hawaii, US
- Hoffman Collection, Berlin, Germany
- Ethnological Museum, Berlin, Germany
- Altoids Collection, New Museum, New York, New York, US
- Norton Collection, New York, US
- Charles Saatchi Collection, London, UK
- Sakima Art Museum, Okinawa, Japan
- Mori Art Museum, Tokyo, Japan
- Museum of Contemporary Art Tokyo, Tokyo, Japan
- Renwick Gallery of the Smithsonian American Art Museum, Washington, D.C., US
- 21st Century Museum of Contemporary Art, Ishikawa, Japan
- Rachofsky Art Collection, Dallas, Texas, US

== Awards ==
- 2001, Skowhegan School of Painting and Sculpture Fellowship, Skowhegan, Maine, US
- 2005, NYFA fellowship - Lily AuchinclossLily Auchincloss Fellow 200 -Vision of Contemporary Artists, Japan
- 2005, Emerging Artist Award, The Aldrich Museum of Contemporary Arts, US
- 2006, Artist in Residence Award, Art Scope Daimler Chrysler Japan, Japan
- 2007, Painters and Sculptors Grant Program Award, Joan Mitchell Foundation, US
