= Agena Castle =

Ryūkyūan gusuku fortification in Japan

Agena Castle 安慶名城
- Uruma, Okinawa
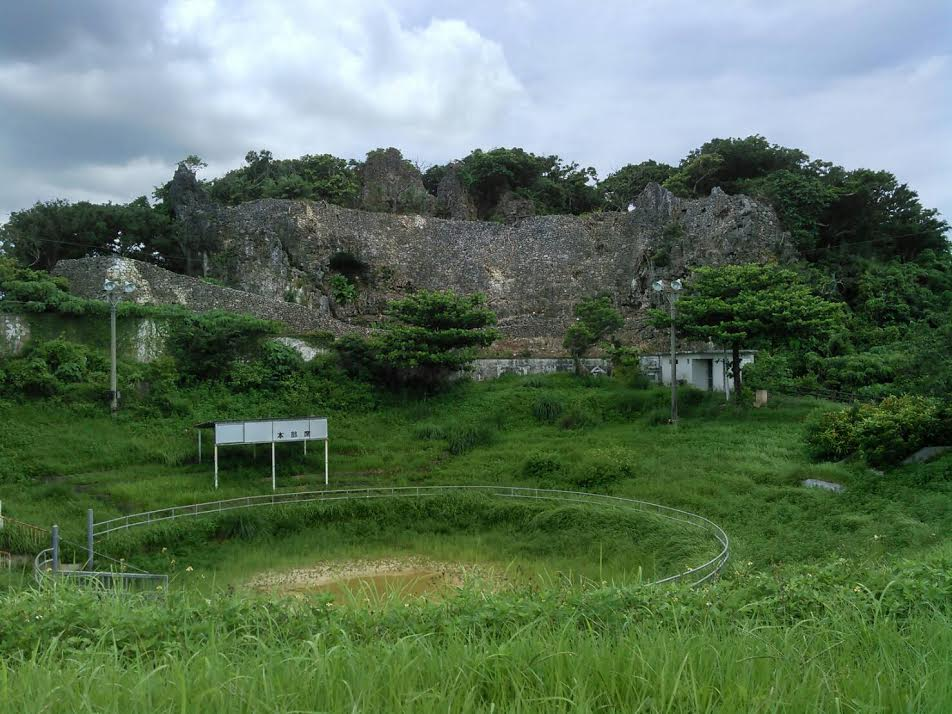
- Agena Castle ruins and bull ring

Site information
- Type: Gusuku
- Open to the public: yes
- Condition: Ruins
- Website: www.city.uruma.lg.jp/bunka/2399

Location
- Tamagusuku Castle
- Location within Okinawa Prefecture Location within Japan
- Coordinates: 26°22′51″N 127°51′01″E

Site history
- Built: early 14th century
- Built by: Ōgawa Aji
- In use: early 14th century-15th century
- Materials: Ryukyuan limestone, wood

Garrison information
- Occupants: Ōgawa Aji, Aji of Gushikawa Magiri
- National Historic Site of Japan

Agena Castle (安慶名城, Agena jō; Okinawan: Agina Gushiku or Aginaa Gushiku) Ryūkyūan gusuku fortification located in the north of Agena district of Uruma, Okinawa, in former Gushikawa. It has been protected by the central government as a National Historic Site since 1987. The area around the castle is now used as Agena Park, which features a bullring within the former castle grounds.

== Overview ==
While most gusuku in Okinawa feature a linear structure with a series of enclosures in the distance and a main enclosure in the background, known as the "renkaku" style, Agena Castle, built on a Ryūkyūan limestone outcrop, features a central enclosure with enclosures surrounding it on the hillside, a rare style known as the "kakushiki" style in the prefecture. It occupies 8,000 square metres (86,000 ft^{2}). Agena Castle sits at an altitude of 49 metres (161 ft), and is naturally protected by the Tengan River to the north. The stone walls are made of Ryūkyū limestone, measuring approximately two meters at their lowest and over ten meters at their highest. The gate leading from the outer bailey to the inner bailey is carved into the natural rock wall, forming an arched stone gate surrounded by cut stonework.

== History ==
The Ōgawa Aji, (male descendants of King Eiso), who ruled central Okinawa Island for three generations from the 15th century (the Sanzan period) through the 16th century, occupied the castle for several generations as regional rulers of the Ōgawa Magiri . For this reason the castle is also known as Ōgawa Castle (大川城, Ōgawa jō). Details of the history of both the castle and the Aji are unclear, and no archaeological excavation has been carried out on the castle. It was likely built in the 14th century. The Ōgawa reached their greatest period of prosperity in the 15th century.

In 1511, King Shō Shin of the Second Shō Dynasty] attempted to create a centralized state. However, the Agena's influence to Gushikawa and the entire central region of Okinawa island, and they refused to listen to his calls pledge fealty to Shuri. In 1526, the royal army attacked Agena Castle; however, the castle's natural fortress and the Tengan River made it difficult to capture. The royal army resorted to starvation and water sieges, drawing the battle into a drawn-out battle. Eventually, they captured Agena Castle, bringing to an end the 70-year reign of the Ōgawa.

The castle's location now holds numerous utaki sites of worship of the Ryūkyūan religion, and is scattered with fragments of Chinese ceramics from the 14th to the 15th century have been found on the castle grounds

== See also ==
- List of Historic Sites of Japan (Okinawa)
