= Haebaru, Okinawa =

Haebaru 南風原町
- Town
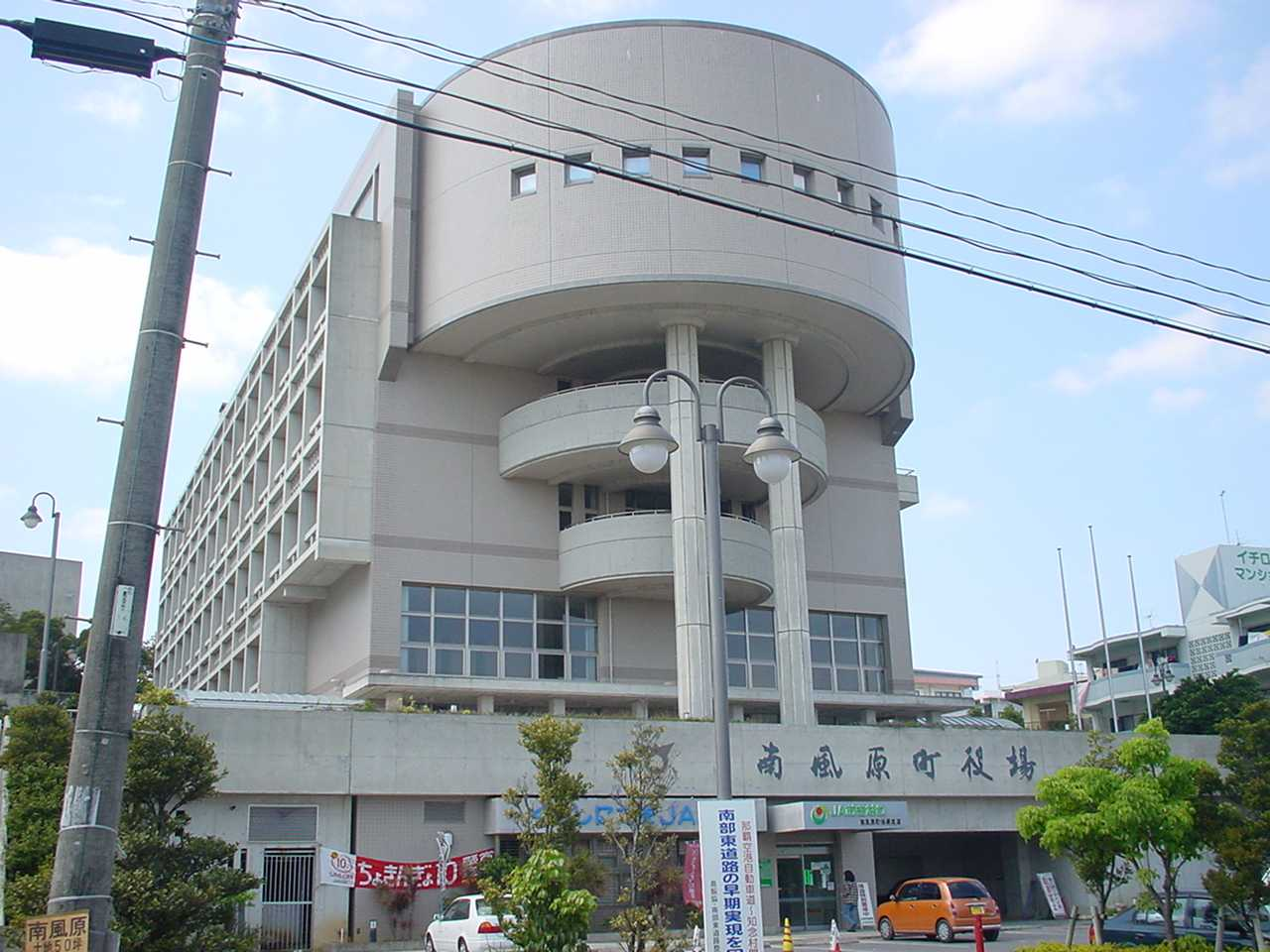

- Flag Emblem

- Location of Haebaru in Okinawa Prefecture

- Location in Japan
- Coordinates: 26°11′28″N 127°43′43″E
- Country: Japan
- Region: Kyushu
- Prefecture: Okinawa Prefecture
- District: Shimajiri

Government
  - Mayor: Masayuki Akamine

Area
  - Total: 10.76 km^{2} (4.15 sq mi)

Population (October 1, 2025)
  - Total: 41,585
  - Density: 3,865/km^{2} (10,010/sq mi)
- Time zone: UTC+09:00 (JST)
- City hall address: 686 Aza Kanegusuku, Haebaru-chō, Shimajiri-gun; 901-1195
- Website: www.town.haebaru.lg.jp in Japanese
- Symbols
- Flower: Bougainvillea
- Tree: Ebony

Haebaru (南風原町, Haebaru-chō; Okinawan: フェーバル Feebaru) is a town located in Shimajiri District, Okinawa Prefecture, Japan.

As of 2025, the town has an estimated population of 41,585 and a density of 3,865 persons per km^{2}. The total area is 10.76 km^{2}. It is one of the only landlocked towns in Okinawa, but its central location ensures traffic and business remain healthy.

Haebaru is located in the south of Okinawa Island directly southeast of the prefectural capital of Naha.

Haebaru is home to several pachinko parlors, as well as a skate and BMX ramp under the Okinawa Expressway. There is a large ÆON shopping complex and hypermarket.

Haebaru is the birthplace of Ultraman, a fictional television character that grows to a giant size and wrestles with giant monsters. The town is also home to a traditional Ryukyuan craft producing woven fabric or kasuri. It is produced at workshops in Haebaru.

In June 2007 dugout bunkers used as military hospitals during the 1945 Battle of Okinawa were opened to the public for tours. In spring 2011, local junior high students began training as peace tour guides in a work experience program aiming to guide members of the public around the caves.

== Geography ==
=== Administrative divisions ===
The town includes twelve wards.

- Arakawa (新川)
- Kamizato (神里)
- Kanegusuku (兼城)
- Kyan (喜屋武)
- Miyagusuku (宮城)
- Miyahira (宮平)
- Motobu (本部)
- Ōna (大名)
- Teruya (照屋)
- Tsukazan (津嘉山)
- Yamakawa (山川)
- Yonaha (与那覇)

=== Neighbouring municipalities ===
- Naha
- Nanjō
- Nishihara
- Tomigusuku
- Yaese
- Yonabaru

== Culture ==
=== Haebaru Town Museum ===
The Haebaru Town Museum is located in the Kiyan district of Haebaru directly west of the site of the Haebaru Japanese Army Hospital. The museum features a reproduction of the facilities of the dugout bunkers that were used for the army hospital. In addition to other wartime artifacts, the museum has exhibits on traditional pre-war Okinawan life and overseas emigrants from the town.

=== Okinawa Prefectural Archives ===
Haebaru is home to the Okinawa Prefectural Archives (OPA). OPA was established on April 1, 1995, as a result of the Japanese Public Archives Act of 1988. The archive seeks to collect and preserve the official documents and historical records of Okinawa Prefecture. OPA collects historical materials and records of the Ryukyu Kingdom, the Government of the Ryukyu Islands, the United States Civil Administration of the Ryukyu Islands (USCAR), and the present-day Okinawa Prefectural Government. In 2011 OPA had 12,595 visitors annually.

== Cultural Properties ==
- Name (Japanese) (Type of registration)

=== Cultural Properties ===
- Mabuni Family tomb (摩文仁家の墓) (Prefectural)
- Miyagusuku Bridge restoration stele (修宮城橋碑) (Municipal)
- Survey stone (印部土手石) (Municipal)
- Ufi Bridge stele (宇平橋碑) (Municipal)

=== Folk Cultural Properties ===
- Stone lion of Kanegusuku (兼城の石獅子)
- Stone lion of Motobu (本部の石獅子)
- Stone lions (2) of Teruya (照屋の石獅子)

=== Historic Sites ===
- Haebaru Army Hospital tunnels (南風原陸軍病院壕（第1外科壕群・第2外科壕群）)
- Hījā-gā spring and stone stele in Ōna (字大名ヒージャーガーと石碑)
- Ushuku-gā spring (御宿井)

=== Natural Monuments ===
- Banyan trees in Nakamō-gwā (中毛小のガジュマル群) (Municipal)
- Fukugi Trees of the Haebaru Magiri Banjo Site (南風原間切番所跡のフクギ群) (Municipal)

== Education ==
Municipal junior high schools:

- Haebaru Junior High School (南風原中学校)
- Nansei Junior High School (南星中学校)

Municipal elementary schools:

- Haebaru Elementary School (南風原小学校)
- Kitaoka Elementary School (北丘小学校)
- Shonan Elementary School (翔南小学校)
- Tsukazan Elementary School (津嘉山小学校)

Okinawa Prefectural Board of Education operates area high schools.

== Notable people ==
- Yuken Teruya, artist
- Kei Chinen, soccer player
