= Katsuren, Okinawa =

Dissolved municipality in Okinawa prefecture, Japan

Katsuren (勝連町, Katsuren-chō) was a town located in Nakagami District, Okinawa Prefecture, Japan. It is on the Katsuren Peninsula. It was founded around Katsuren Castle as Katchin Magiri (勝連間切) in the 17th century, which then became Katsuren village in 1908 after the Ryūkyū Kingdom was annexed by Japan and the Magiri system was abolished.

As of 2003, the town had an estimated population of 13,530 and a density of 986.87 persons per km^{2}. The total area was 13.71 km^{2}.

On April 1, 2005, Katsuren, along with the cities of Gushikawa and Ishikawa, and the town of Yonashiro (also from Nakagami District), was merged to create the city of Uruma.

== Photography ==
- Katsuren Photos, HDR Photography of the Katsuren region of Okinawa.
