= Gushikawa, Okinawa =

Dissolved municipality in Okinawa prefecture, Japan

Gushikawa (具志川市, Gushikawa-shi; Okinawan: Gushichaa) was a city located in Okinawa Prefecture, Japan. Agena Castle was built here, and the city was founded in the 17th century as Gushichā Magiri (具志川間切). After the Ryūkyū Kingdom was annexed by Japan and the Magiri system abolished, the area was renamed Gushikawa village in 1908. Gushikawa was elevated to city status on July 1, 1968.

As of 2003, the city had an estimated population of 62,814 and a density of 1,963.55 persons per km^{2}. The total area was 31.99 km^{2}.

On April 1, 2005, Gushikawa, along with the city of Ishikawa, and the towns of Katsuren and Yonashiro (both from Nakagami District), was merged to create the city of Uruma.

== Notable people from Gushikawa, Okinawa ==
- Tatsuo Shimabuku, Japanese karateka and founder of the Isshin-ryū karate style
- Kikuyo Ishikawa, Japanese former mixed martial artist
