= Yonashiro, Okinawa =

Dissolved municipality in Nakagami district, Okinawa prefecture, Japan

Yonashiro (与那城町, Yonashiro-chō; Okinawan: Yunagushiku) was a town located in Nakagami District, Okinawa Prefecture, Japan.

As of 2003, the town had an estimated population of 13,177 and the density of 691.71 persons per km^{2}. The total area was 19.05 km^{2}.

On April 1, 2005, Yonashiro, along with the cities of Gushikawa and Ishikawa, and the town of Katsuren (also from Nakagami District), was merged to create the city of Uruma.

Originally it was Yonagusuku Village (与那城村, Yonagusuku-son). It was elevated to town status and renamed to Yonashiro in 1994.
