= Nakagami District, Okinawa =

District in Okinawa Prefecture, Japan

Coordinates: 26°18′33″N 127°46′38″E

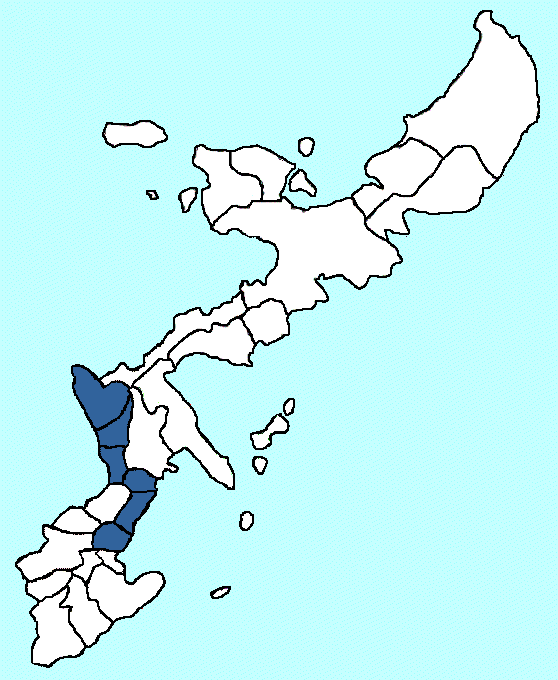
Nakagami District in Okinawa Prefecture

Nakagami (中頭郡, Nakagami-gun; Okinawan: Nakajan) is a district located in Okinawa Prefecture, Japan.

As of 2003, the district has an estimated population of 169,332 and the density of 1,216.03 persons per km^{2}. The total area is 139.25 km^{2}.

== Towns and villages ==
- Chatan
- Kadena
- Nishihara
- Kitanakagusuku
- Nakagusuku
- Yomitan

== Mergers ==
- On April 1, 2005 Katsuren and Yonashiro were merged with the old cities of Gushikawa and Ishikawa to form the new city of Uruma.
