= Gushikami, Okinawa =

Dissolved municipality in Okinawa prefecture, Japan

Gushikami-son (具志頭村, Gushikami-son; Okinawan: Gushichan) was a village located in Shimajiri District, Okinawa Prefecture, Japan.

As of 2003, the village had an estimated population of 7,936 and a density of 655.33 persons per km^{2}. The total area was 12.11 km^{2}.

On January 1, 2006, Gushikami, along with the town of Kochinda (also from Shimajiri District), was merged to create the town of Yaese.
