= Ishikawa, Okinawa =

Dissolved municipality in Okinawa prefecture, Japan

Coordinates: 26.426°N 127.822°E

Flag of Ishikawa City.

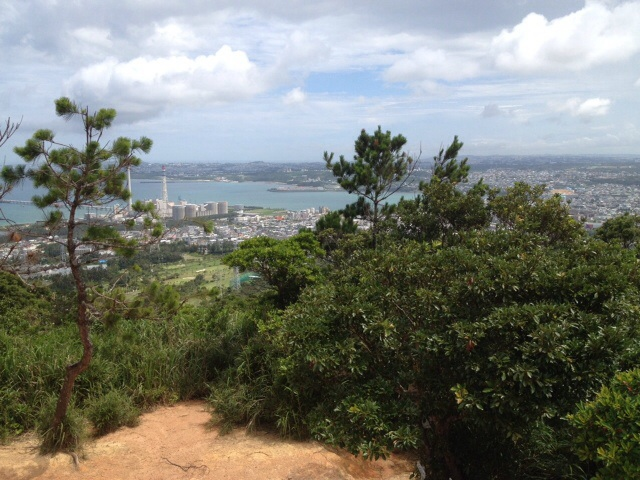
Ishikawa City as seen from Mount Ishikawa.

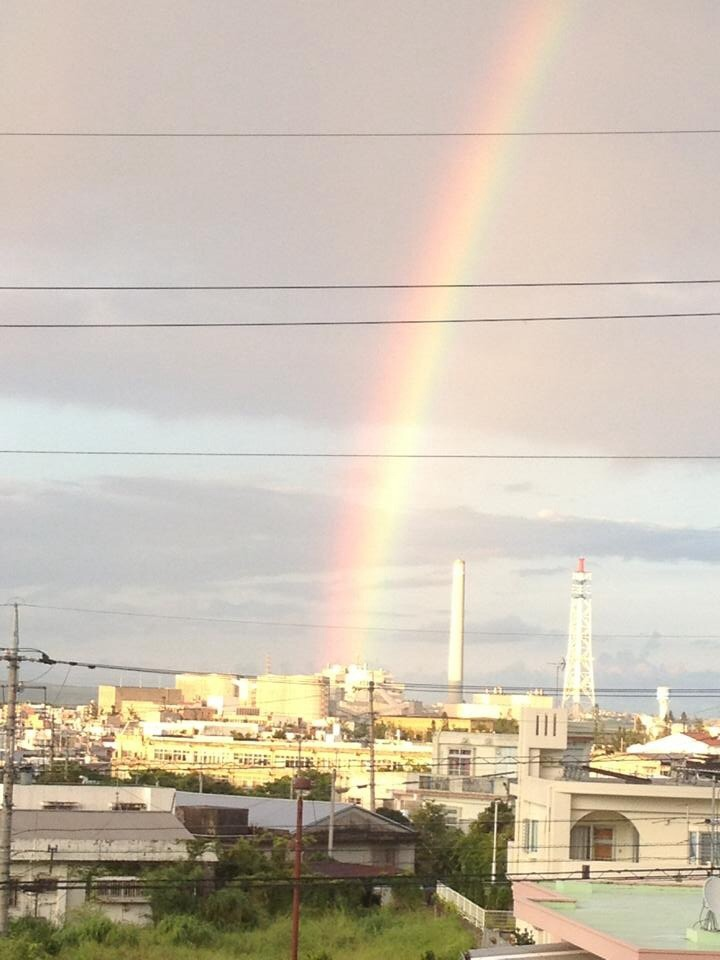
A view of Ishikawa City below Iha Castle.

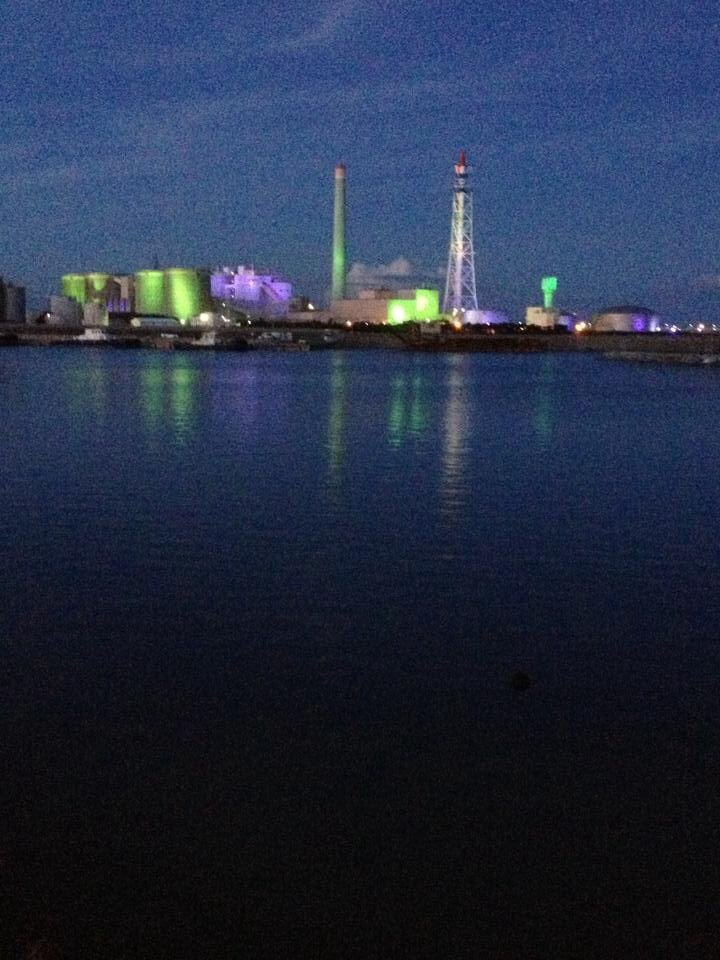
Ishikawa Powerplant seen from Ishikawa Beach.

Ishikawa (石川市, Ishikawa-shi; Okinawan: Ishichā) was a city located in Okinawa Prefecture, Japan. The city was founded on September 26, 1945. It was named after the nearby Mount Ishikawa and the Ishikawa River.

As of 2003, the city had an estimated population of 22,126 and a density of 1,052.12 persons per km^{2}. The total area was 21.03 km^{2}.

On April 1, 2005, Ishikawa, along with the city of Gushikawa, and the towns of Katsuren and Yonashiro (both from Nakagami District), was merged to create the city of Uruma.
