= Yaese, Okinawa =

Yaese 八重瀬町
- Town
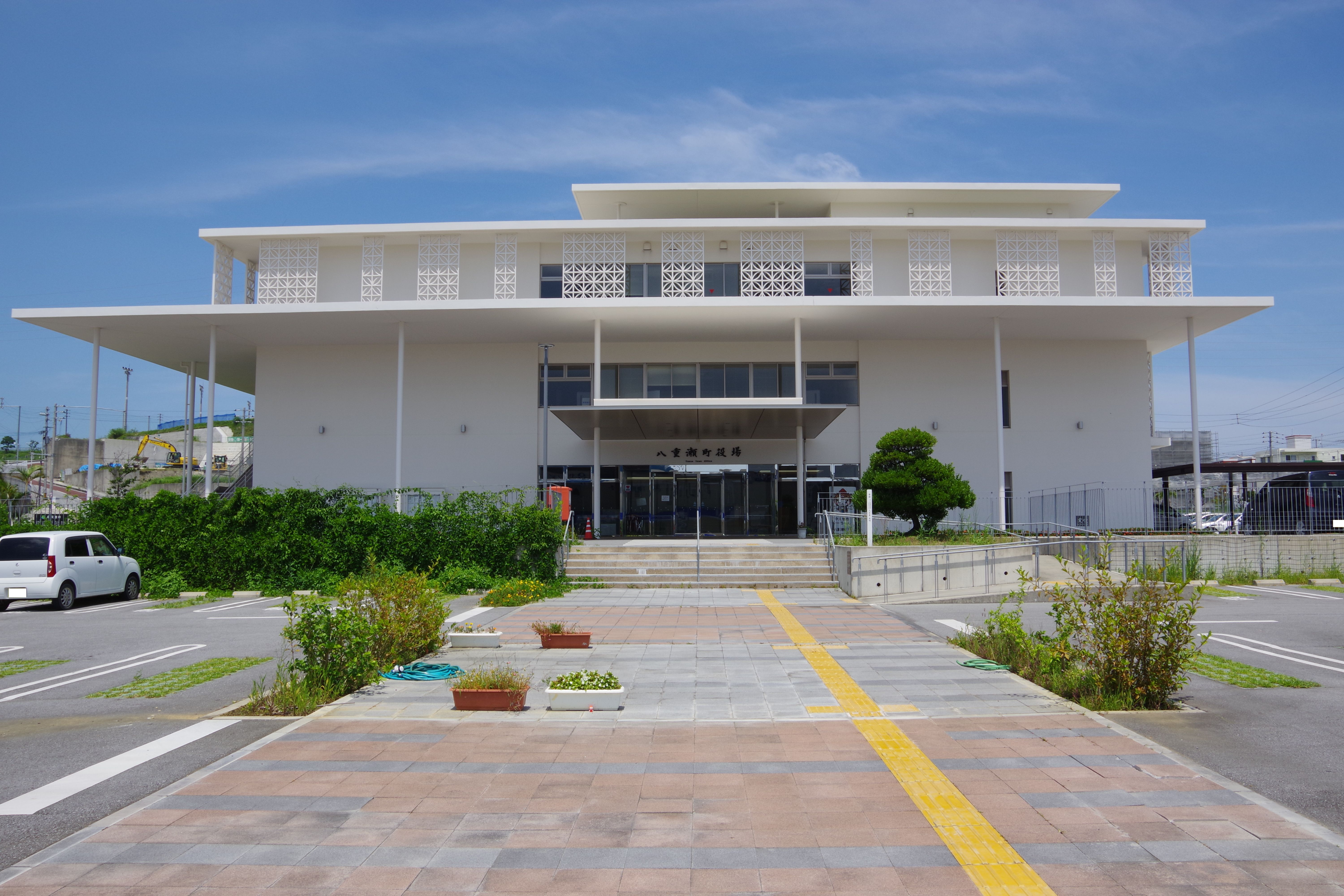
- Yaese Town Office

- Flag Seal
- Location of Yaese in Okinawa Prefecture

- Location in Japan
- Coordinates: 26°9′29″N 127°43′7″E
- Country: Japan
- Region: Kyushu
- Prefecture: Okinawa Prefecture
- District: Shimajiri

Area
  - Total: 26.96 km^{2} (10.41 sq mi)

Population (2025)
  - Total: 33,255
  - Density: 1,233/km^{2} (3,195/sq mi)
- Time zone: UTC+09:00 (JST)
- City hall address: 659 Gushikami, Yaese-chō, Shimajiri-gun, Okinawa-ken; 901-0592
- Website: www.town.yaese.okinawa.jp
- Symbols
- Fish: Flying fish
- Flower: Marigold
- Tree: Ebony

Yaese (八重瀬町, Yaese-chō; Okinawan: Eeji) is a town located in Shimajiri District, Okinawa Prefecture, Japan.

Yaese was formed on January 1, 2006 by a merger between the town of Kochinda and the village of Gushikami.

As of 2025, Yaese has a population of 33,255, with a population density of 1,200 persons per km^{2}. The total area of the town of Yaese is 26.96 square kilometres (10.41 mi^{2}).

Yaese Town is host to the Tomori Shīsā, considered the oldest stone shīsā conserved. It is designated as a Cultural Property by Okinawa Prefecture.

== Geography ==
The highest point of the town, Mount Yaese (163 m), is located in its centre. Lower hills develop around it. There are four second category rivers in the town: Nagadō-gawa River, Noha-gawa River, Yūhi-gawa River and Mukue-gawa River.

=== Administrative divisions ===
The town includes twenty-three wards.

==== Gushichan (具志頭) ====
- Aragusuku (新城)
- Asato (安里)
- Gushichan (具志頭)
- Hanashiro (玻名城)
- Koshihara (後原)
- Minatogawa (港川)
- Nagamō (長毛)
- Nakaza (仲座)
- Ōton (大頓)
- Yoza (与座)

==== Kochinda (東風平) ====
- Gishi (宜次)
- Hokama (外間)
- Iha (伊覇)
- Kochinda (東風平)
- Kogusuku (小城)
- Shitahaku (志多伯)
- Takara (高良)
- Tōme (当銘)
- Tomori (富盛)
- Tomoyose (友寄)
- Uetabaru (上田原)
- Yagibaru (屋宜原)
- Yonagusuku (世名城) / Yonashiro (世名城)

=== Neighbouring municipalities ===
- Haebaru
- Itoman
- Nanjō
- Tomigusuku

== Notable people from Yaese ==
- Hitoe Arakaki, singer

== Cultural and natural assets ==
Yaese Town lists twenty-six tangible cultural properties and monuments, including eleven ones designated or registered at the national, prefectural or municipal level.

- Name (Japanese) (Type of registration)

=== Cultural Properties ===
- Aragusuku Gusuku (新城グスク)
- Gushichan Gusuku (具志頭グスク)
- Gushichan Uiigusuku (具志頭上グスク)
- Jiri Gusuku (勢理グスク)
- Kabira Shelter Site (カラビ壕遺跡)
- Kaniman Utaki Site (カニマン御嶽遺跡)
- Māga-nu-tun Site (マーガヌ殿遺跡)
- Midori Gusuku (ミドリグスク)
- Minatogawa Ancient Human Bones Site (港川古代人骨遺跡)
- Minatogawa Site (港川遺跡)
- Tatana Gusuku (多々名グスク)
- Temigura Gusuku (テミグラグスク)
- Yaese Gusuku (八重瀬グスク)
- Yagi Family Residence (main house, stone wall, hinpun wall, asagi dependence and well) (屋宜家住宅 主屋、石垣、ヒンプン、アサギ、井戸) (National)
- Yonagusuku Gusuku (世名城グスク)
- Yoza-nu-tun Site (与座ヌ殿遺跡)

=== Folk Cultural Properties ===
- Funerary equipment of Tōme and Kogusuku (当銘・小城の共有龕及び付属葬具一式) (Prefectural)
- Large stone lion of Tomori (富盛の石彫大獅子) (Prefectural)

=== Places of scenic beauty ===
- Hanandā (natural stone bridge) (National)

=== Natural Monuments ===
- Banyan tree of Tōna (当名のガジュマル) (Municipal)
- Banyan tree of Yonagusuku (世名城のガジュマル) (Municipal)
- Fukugi tree lane of Gushichan (具志頭のフクギ並木) (National)
