= Chinen, Okinawa =

Former village in Okinawa Prefecture, Japan

Chinen (知念村, Chinen-son; Okinawan: Chinin, Northern Ryukyuan: ちゑねん Chiwenen) was a village located in Shimajiri District, Okinawa Prefecture, Japan. As of 2003, the village had an estimated population of 5,947 and a density of 602.53 persons per km^{2}. The total area was 9.87 km^{2}. On January 1, 2006, Chinen, along with the town of Sashiki, and the villages of Ōzato and Tamagusuku (all from Shimajiri District), was merged to create the city of Nanjō.

== History ==
According to the Chūzan Seikan (1650), the creation goddess, Amamikyu, built Chinen Castle soon after forming the Ryukyu Islands. Chinen was important for later lords and kings because of its many holy sites, most notably Sefa-utaki.

The village of Chinen (pronounced shi-nen) was appropriated by the United States in 1948 for the purpose of building a secret Central Intelligence Agency operated logistics base, under US Army cover, known as Camp Chinen. Camp Chinen was closed after it was exposed in The Pentagon Papers. The Pentagon Papers revealed a 1961 memo from General Edward Lansdale to General Maxwell Taylor which states that a CIA support base in Okinawa at Camp Chinen housed a covert prison, in addition to a paramilitary training, research and logistics facility. The memorandum read:

CIA Okinawa Support Base:

"Okinawa Station is in itself a paramilitary support asset and, in critical situations calling for extensive support of Unconventional Warfare (UW) activity in the Far East, could be devoted in its entirety to this mission. Located at Camp Chinen, it comprises a self-contained base under Army cover with facilities of all types necessary to the storage, testing, packaging, procurement and delivery of supplies-ranging from weapons and explosives to medical and clothing. Because of it being a controlled area, it can accommodate admirably the holding of black bodies in singletons or small groups, as well as small groups of trainees..."

Upon its closure as a CIA station in July 1972, Camp Chinen served as a US Army Special Forces training center, and as a language school for U.S. soldiers studying Japanese and Korean, and for Japanese forces studying English. Camp Chinen closed in 1975.
