= Shimajiri =

Shimajiri may refer to:

== People ==
- Aiko Shimajiri (b. 1965), Japanese politician

== Places ==
- Shimajiri, an area of Miyakojima, Okinawa
- Shimajiri District, a district in Okinawa Prefecture, Japan
- Shimajiri District, one of the administrative divisions of the Ryukyu Kingdom

== Science ==
- Shimajiri Group, a geological group of the Ryukyu Arc
