= Amamikyu =

Creation goddess in the Ryukyuan religion

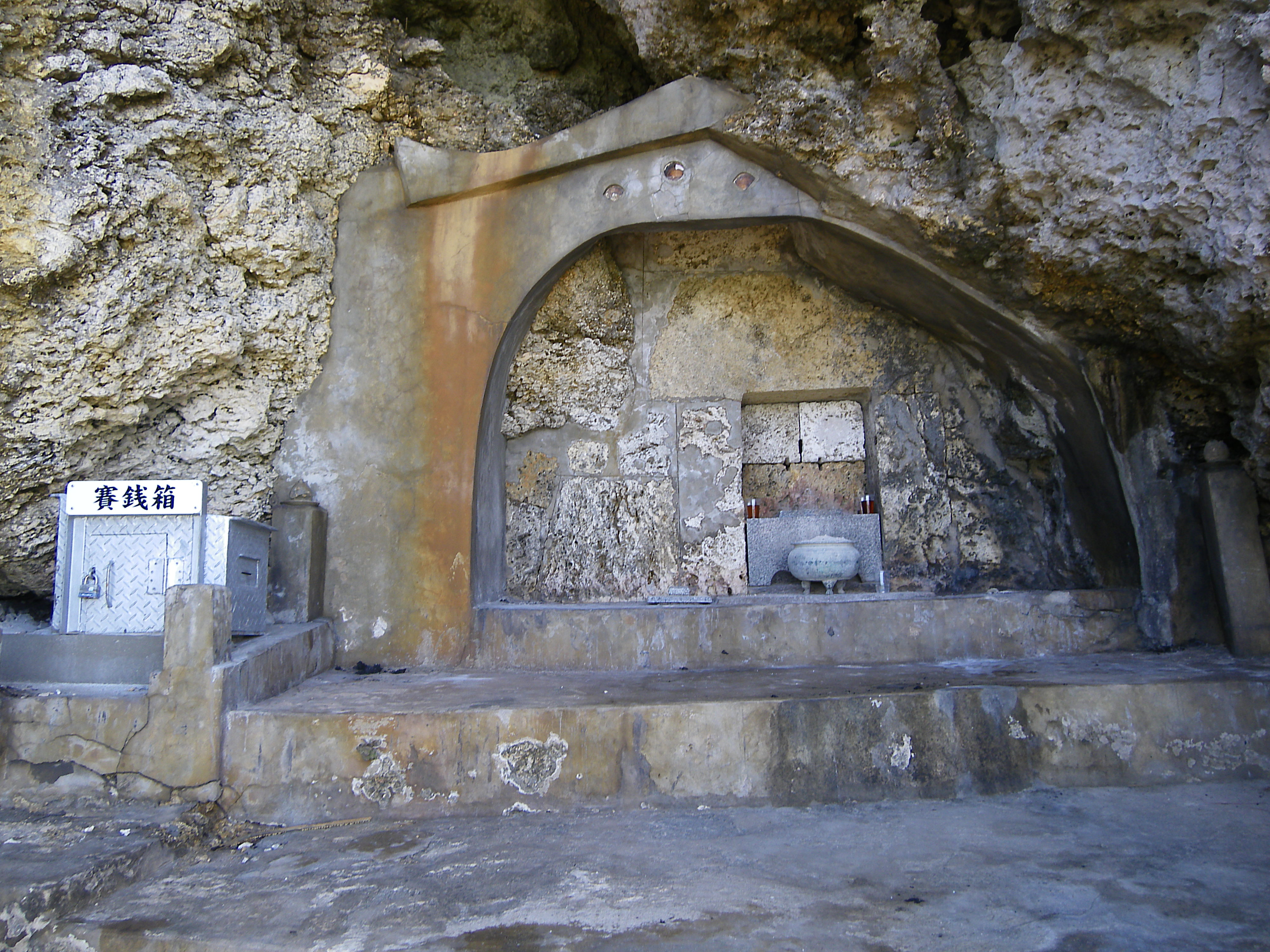
Tomb of Amamikyu

Amamikyu (阿摩美久 or 阿摩彌姑; Okinawan: アマミチュー Amamichuu), or Amekushin-otome-ōankami (天久臣乙女王御神), is the creation goddess of the Ryukyu Islands in the Ryukyuan religion.

== Name ==
The name "Amamikyu" is a Japanese reading of the Chinese characters 阿摩美久 or 阿摩彌姑, which were most likely written ad hoc for the Okinawan pronunciation. It is likely related to the name of the Amami Islands. There are also kanji spellings of 天御子 and 天美子 Amamiko. Readings can vary widely from Amamikyu, Amamikyo, Amamikiyo, Amamiko, Amamiku, Amamigu, Amamichuu, and Amanchuu. "Amamikyu" was used by George H. Kerr in his Ryukyu: Kingdom and Province Before 1945 in 1953.

== Creation myth ==
The beginning of Chūzan Seikan details the creation of the Ryukyu Islands. The Heavenly Emperor (天帝), who lived in the Heavenly Gusuku (天城), looked down on the world and saw that there were no islands, so he ordered Amamikyu (阿摩美久) to create the Ryukyu Islands. She asked for materials to build the islands, so the Heavenly Emperor sent Shinerikyu to bring her grasses, trees, and stones. She descended to Earth on Kudaka Island, and then made landfall on Okinawa Island on the spot of Sefa-utaki, and later built Tamagusuku Castle and Chinen Castle and a number of communities. She asked the Heavenly Emperor for materials to make people, but the other gods would not go down to Earth. Without sexual intercourse, she became pregnant by the divine spirit (志仁禮久 Shinerikyu, Okinawan: シニリチュー shinirichuu) and populated the islands. Some generations later, a "heavenly grandchild" named Tentei was born, who split Ryukyuan society into five classes with his three sons and two daughters: the first son was Tenson, who became the first King of Ryukyu; the second son became the first feudal lord (Aji); the third son became the first farmer; the first daughter became the first royal noro priestess; and the second daughter became the first village noro priestess. Her final home was Minton Castle in Tamagusuku, Okinawa.

== Historical legacy ==
Amamikyu's tomb is located on Hamahiga Island in Uruma, Okinawa. Sefa-utaki is the holiest utaki site in the Ryukyuan religion. During the Ryukyu Kingdom era, the king and kikoe-ōgimi made an annual pilgrimage to the site from Shuri Castle to worship Amamikyu, facing Kudaka Island.

== See also ==
- Ame-no-Minakanushi
- Imra
