= Itokazu Castle =

Nanjo, Okinawa, Japan

Itokazu Castle 糸数城
- Nanjō, Okinawa
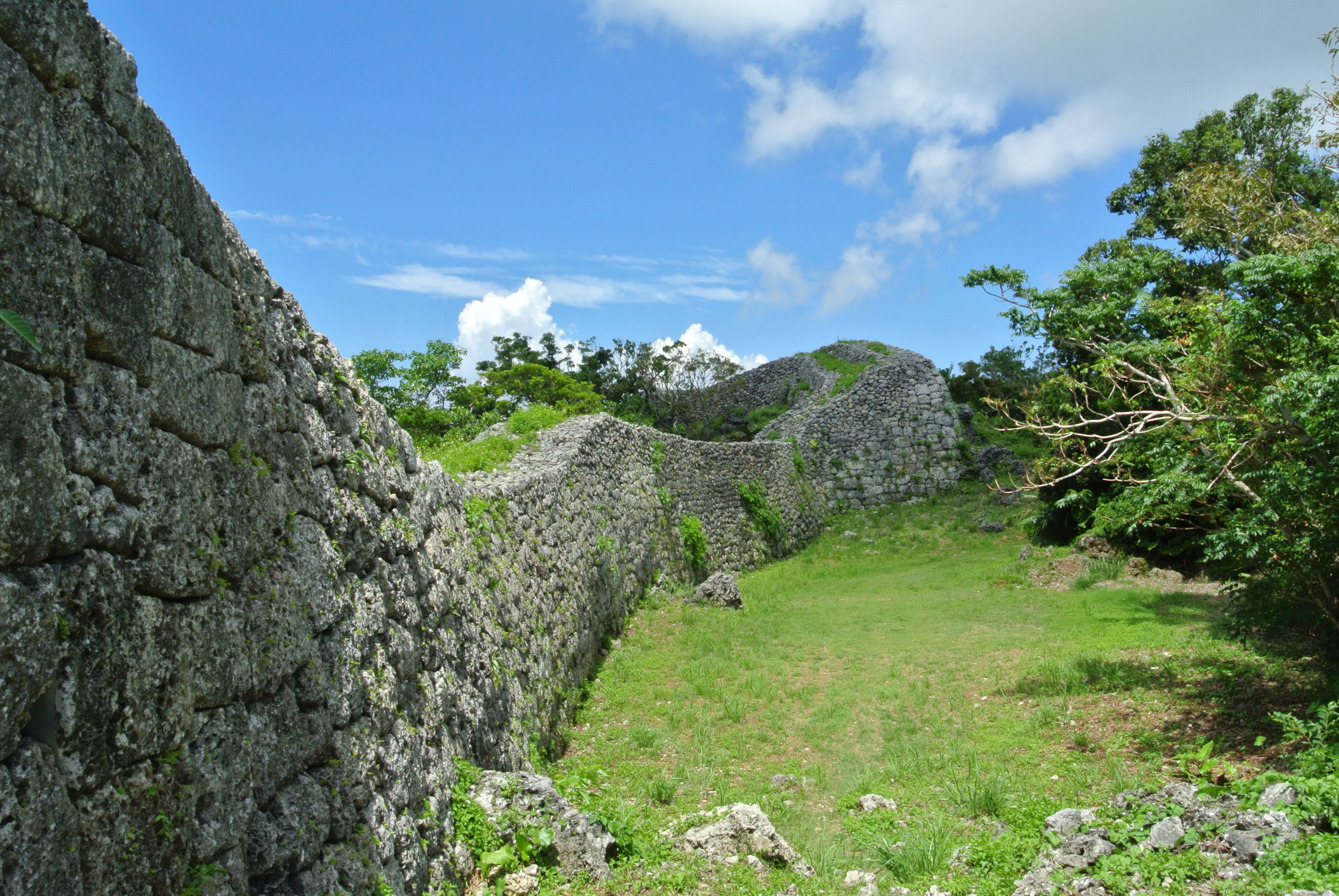
- Ruins of Itokazu Castle

Site information
- Type: Gusuku
- Open to the public: yes
- Condition: Ruins

Location
- footnotes = National Historic Site of Japan Itokazu Castle 糸数城 (Japan)
- Coordinates: 26°09′05″N 127°45′45″E

Site history
- Built: Mid-14th century
- Materials: Ryukyuan limestone, wood

Itokazu Castle (糸数城, Itokazu jō; Okinawan: Ichukaji Gushiku) is a Ryūkyūan gusuku fortification located in the Tamagusuku neighborhood of the city of Nanjō, Okinawa. The castle ruins were designated a National Historic Site on May 15, 1972.

== History ==
Built on a Ryūkyū limestone cliff extending westward from the Chinen Peninsula in the southern part of Okinawa island, the Itokazu Castle ruins have well-preserved stone walls and gates. While the exact date of construction is unknown, however, according to Sai On's edition of the Chūzan Seifu the Sanzan period of Ryūkyū history, King Tamagusuku of Tamagusuku Castle (traditional dates: 1314–1336) appointed his second son as Oshiro Aji of Ōzato and his third son as Aji of Itokazu in order to control his territory, and each had a castle built. Itokazu Castle is surrounded by cliffs or steep slopes on three sides except for the east, with the south side being particularly steep.The eastern side is a flat hill leading up to Tamagusuku Castle, offering good visibility but a weak spot for defense, so high walls and a main gate were built. The castle had a watchtower, known as "Hue (South) Azana," which served as both a lookout and a viewing point. The walls were made of both rough-faced and cut stone, and reached a height of six meters. The site itself was the location of a more ancient fortification, Neishigusuku Castle, which was also an utaki pilgrimage site. The Chūzan Seikan and Chūzan Seifu state that the Aji of Ōzato defeated Tamagusuku Castle and other castles, proclaiming himself King of Sannan. The castle appears to have fallen into disrepair afterwards, although its castle town continued to exist. It was relocated to the west of the castle ruins in 1886.

The castle ruins are about a 30-minute drive from Naha.

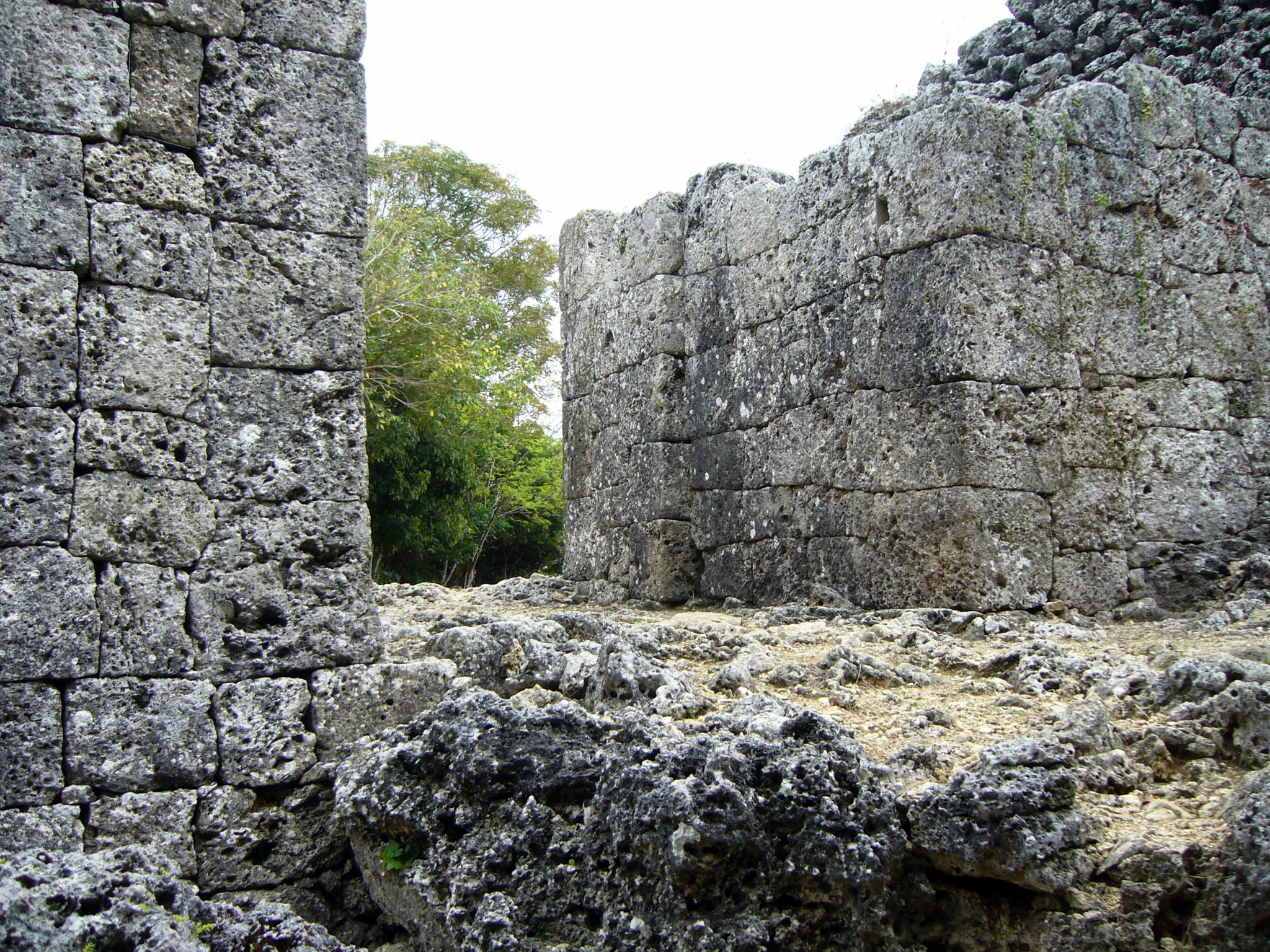
Site of Gate

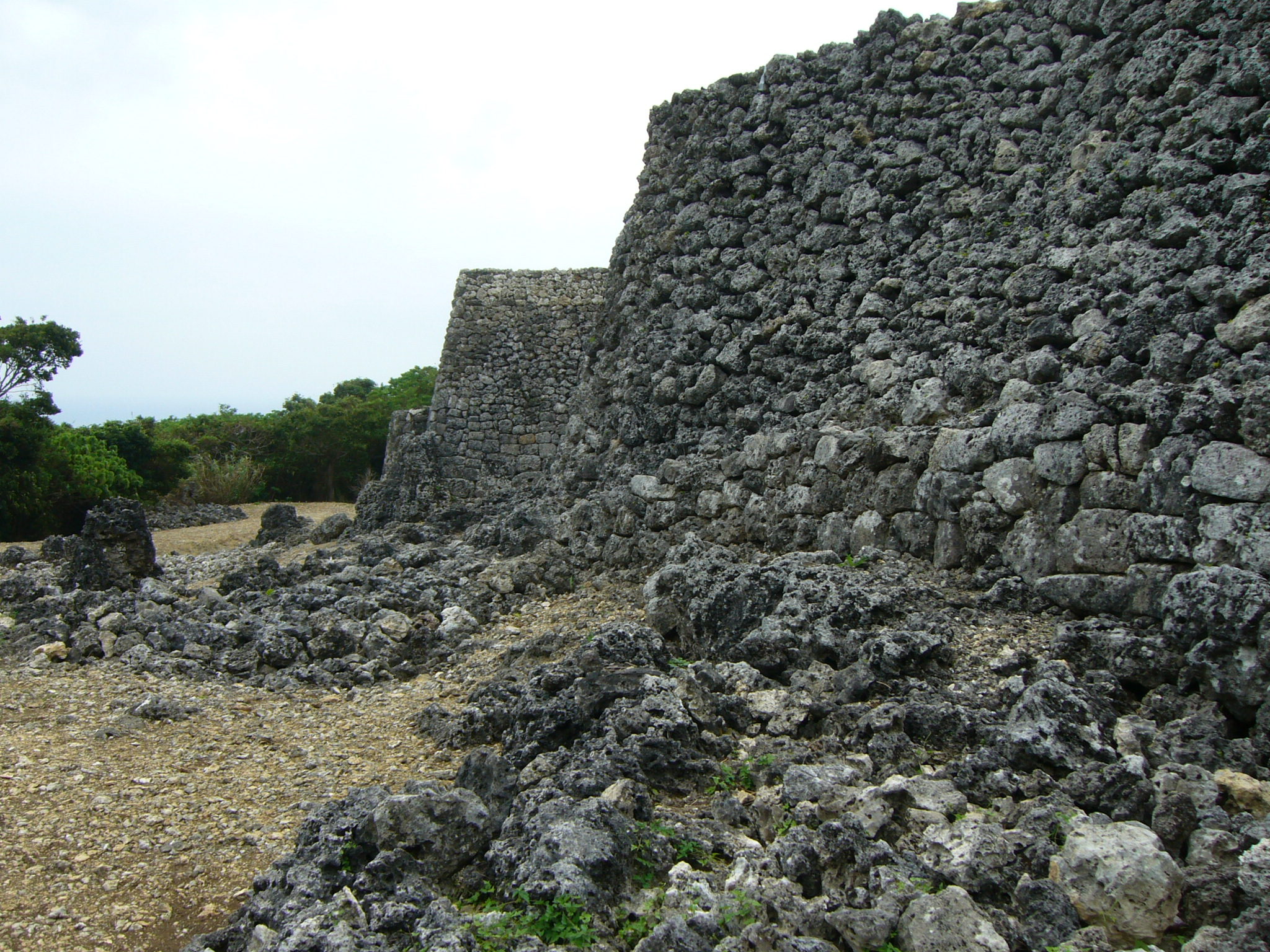
Castle Walls

== See also ==
- List of Historic Sites of Japan (Okinawa)
