= Chinen Castle =

Ryukyuan gusuku in Nanjō, Okinawa, Japan

Chinen Castle 知念城
- Nanjō, Okinawa

Site information
- Type: Gusuku
- Open to the public: yes
- Condition: Ruins

Location
- footnotes = National Historic Site of Japan Chinen Castle 知念城 (Japan)
- Coordinates: 26°09′37″N 127°48′43″E

Site history
- In use: pre-14th century–1893
- Materials: Ryukyuan limestone, wood

Garrison information
- Occupants: Aji of Chinen Magiri

Chinen Castle (知念城, Chinen jō; Okinawan: Chinin Gushiku) is a Ryūkyūan gusuku fortification located in the city of Nanjō, Okinawa. The castle ruins were designated a National Historic Site on May 15, 1972.

== Overview ==
Chinen Castle is located on a coastal terrace about 100 meters above sea level, overlooking the Pacific Ocean on the Chinen Peninsula, at the southern eastern tip of Okinawa's main island. While the date of the castle's founding is unknown, it is believed to have been the stronghold of the Aji of Chinen Magiri and is the second oldest castle in the Ryukyu Islands. The castle consists of two enclosures, the old castle to the east being made out of rough-faced stone walls and the other newer castle to the west, and ten meters lower, being made out of ashlar masonry. Before the Sanzan Period, the "King of the Ryukyu Islands" and the chief priestess would make a pilgrimage to Chinen Castle. The castle was the home of the Aji of Chinen Magiri. The new castle was built

The new castle is said to have been built by Uchima Ufuya, the half-brother of King Shō Shin, the third king of the Second Shō Dynasty, who reigned from 1477 to 1526. The castle is a linked-wall structure with the old and new castles running east to west. The new castle has a main gate to the east and a rear gate to the north, both of which are arched and made of cut stone. The castle interior features stone walls and masonry that function as shutters, a remote worship hall for Kudaka Island, famous for Okinawa's creation legend, and a ritual facility dedicated to the god of fire. The castle was underwent extensive repairs by King Shō Kei in the 18th century.

It is approximately a 45-minute drive from Naha Airport.
