= Tamagusuku Castle =

Castle, Okinawa Prefecture, Japan

Tamagusuku Castle 玉城城
- Nanjō, Okinawa
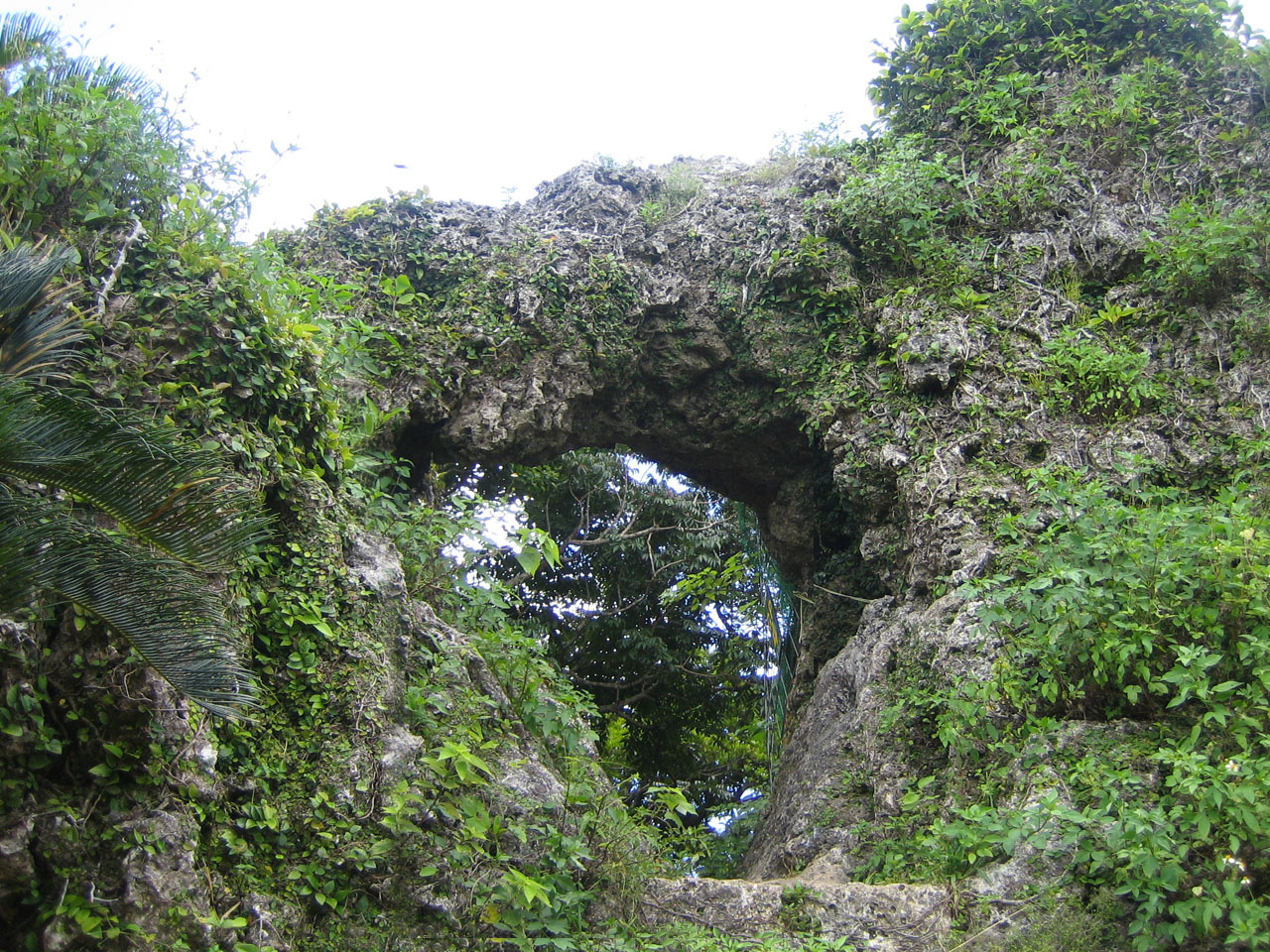
- Tamagusuku arch

Site information
- Type: Gusuku
- Open to the public: yes
- Condition: Ruins

Location
- Tamagusuku Castle
- Location within Okinawa Prefecture Location within Japan
- Coordinates: 26°8′38.4″N 127°46′50.9″E

Site history
- Built: pre-14th century
- Materials: Ryukyuan limestone, wood

Garrison information
- Occupants: Aji of Tamagusuku Magiri
- National Historic Site of Japan

Tamagusuku Castle (玉城城, Tamagusuku jō; Okinawan: Tamagushiku) is a Ryūkyūan gusuku fortification located in the city of Nanjō, Okinawa Prefecture, Japan. It is the oldest castle on Okinawa Island; according to the Chūzan Seikan, it was built by Amamikyu, the creation goddess of the Ryūkyūan religion. It has been protected by the central government as a National Historic Site since 1987.

== Overview ==
Tamagusuku Castle was built on a natural cliff, with a cliff to the northwest and high stone walls on the eastern slope. The first, second, and third baileys are arranged in a tiered pattern from top to bottom. . It is located about 700 meters north of Tamagusuku village. It was the home of the Aji of Tamagusuku Magiri. The site of the main citadel is home to the "Amatsugi Amatsugi Utaki," and important utaki in the Ryūkyūan religion and a pilgrimage site. This highlights that Okinawan gusuku castles were not simply fortifications but also had religious significance.

While the date of construction is unknown, it is said that King Tamagusuku, the fourth king of the King Eiso lineage (1260-1349), resided here and renovated and expanded the castle. The stone wall construction suggests it dates back approximately 600 years. The stone walls of the second and third baileys were demolished and used for building materials during U.S. military rule after the end of World War II, due to their proximity to the Chinen Supply Area (Camp Chinen) a secret Central Intelligence Agency operated logistics base, under US Army cover Currently, only the remains of the main bailey, including the walls and stone paving, remain. The main bailey's walls remain nearly intact, and there is a castle gate carved out of a single natural rock.

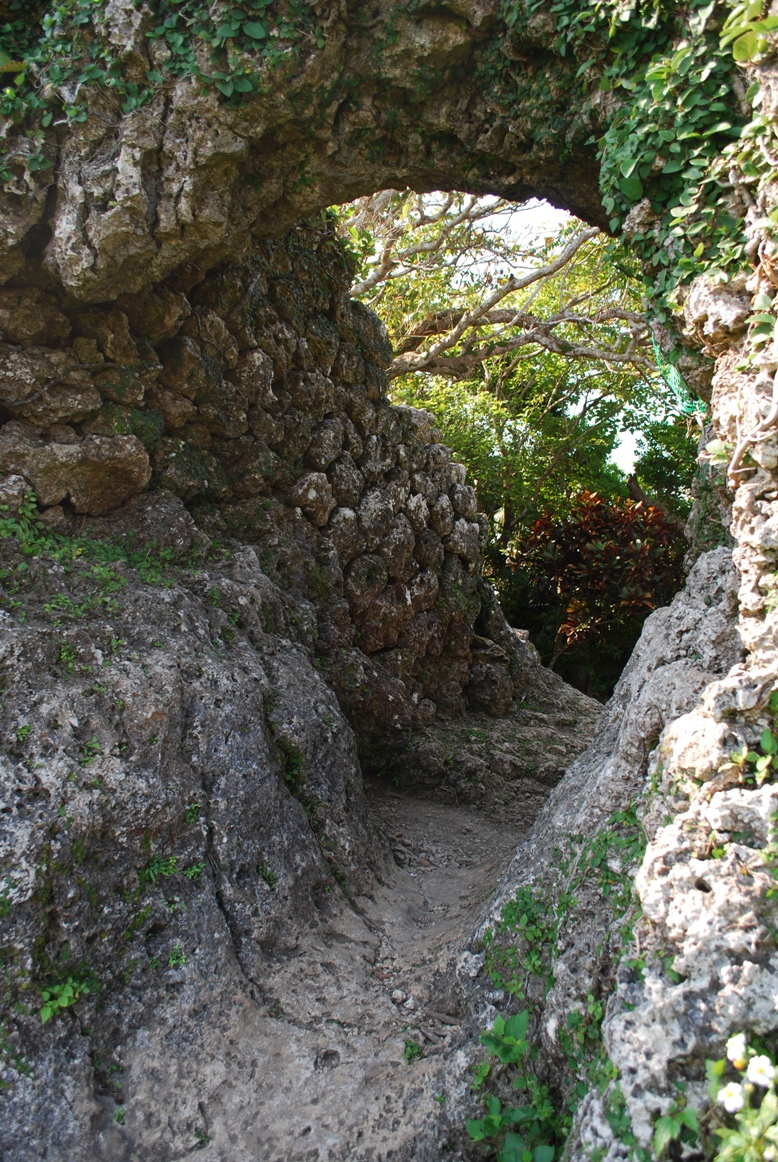
Main castle gate

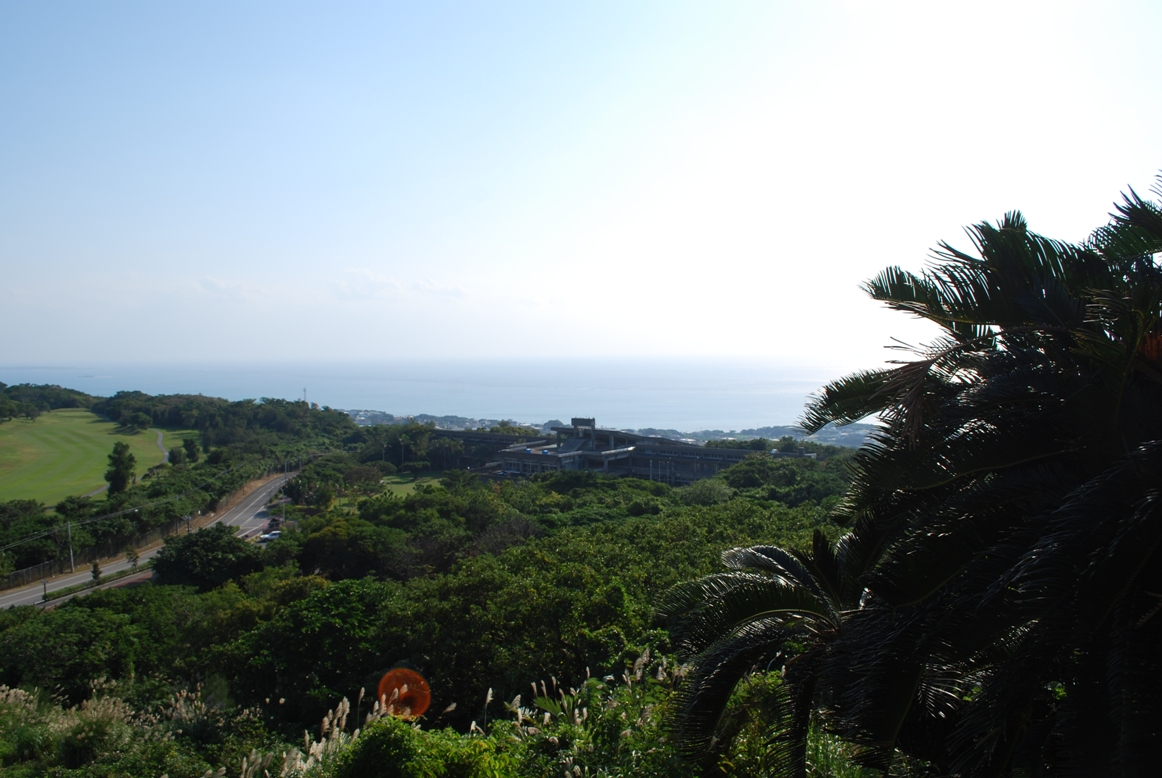
view from Main castle gate

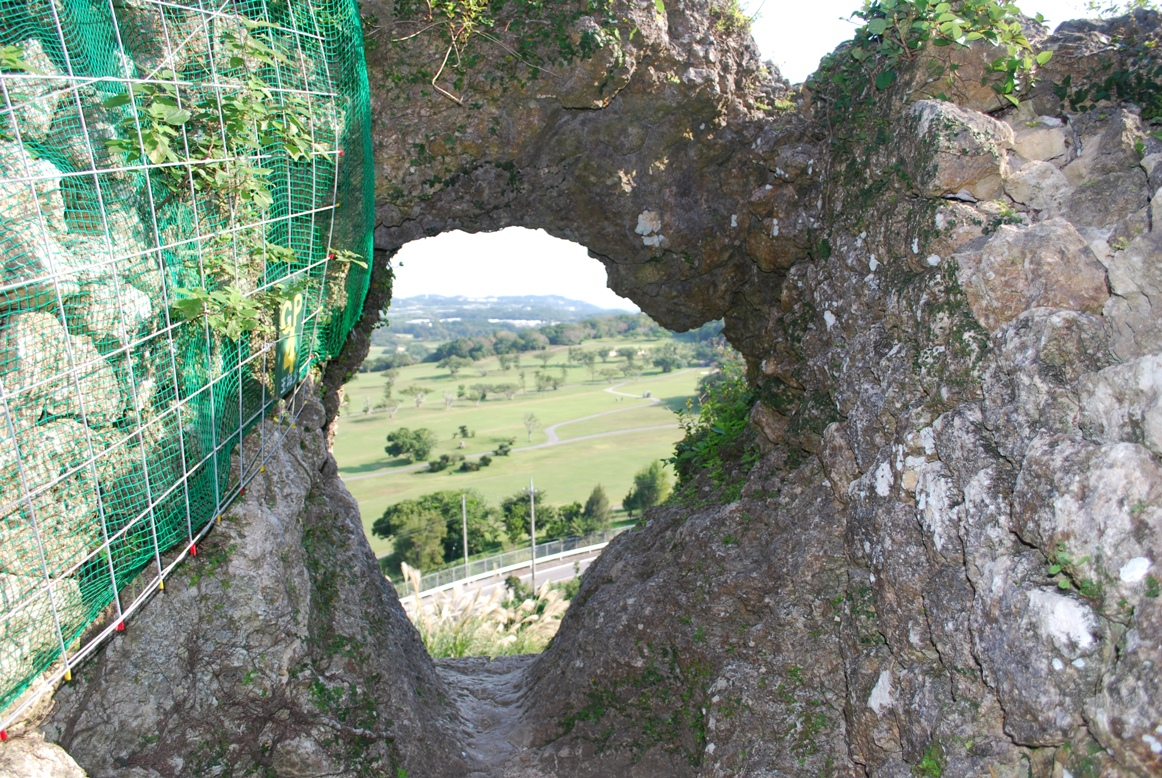
Main castle gate

According to legend, when Gihon, the third king of the Shunten dynasty, was to be executed at Tamagusuku Castle for misrule Ame-do Tenji brought rain to put out the fire and saved him. Afterward, Gihon escaped and wandered the north, where many graves and shrines dedicated to him can be found in the north, including at Cape Hedo.

== See also ==
- List of Historic Sites of Japan (Okinawa)
