= Binnu Utaki =

Religious site in Okinawa Prefecture, Japan

Binnu Utaki 弁之御嶽
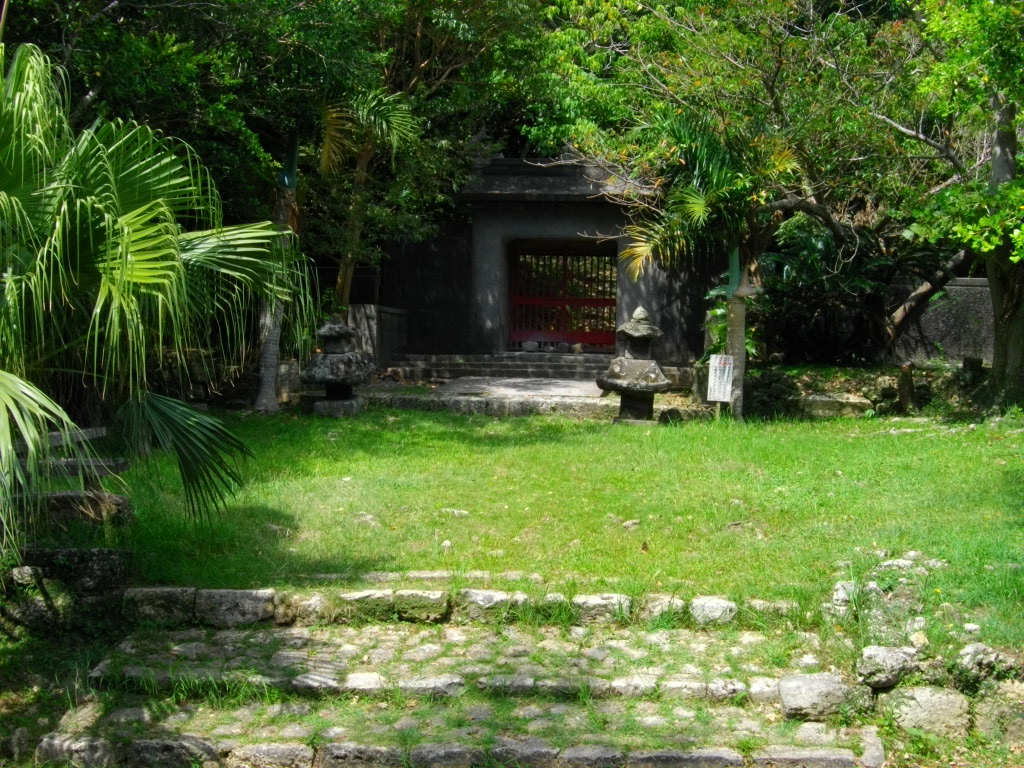

- Binnu Utaki Binnu Utaki (Japan)

Religion
- Affiliation: Ryukyuan religion

Location
- Location: 4-chome, Shuri Toribori-cho, Naha-shi, Okinawa-ken
- Interactive map of Binnu Utaki 弁之御嶽
- Coordinates: 26°13′0.4″N 127°43′53″E
- National Historic Site of Japan

Binnu Utaki (Okinawan: 弁之御嶽, ビンヌウタキ, romanized: Bin-nu-utaki) was a sacred site for national rituals, including prayers for the king's health and the nation's peace in the Ryūkyū Kingdom. It is located in the city of Naha in Okinawa Prefecture, Japan. It was designated a National Historic Site in 2018.

== Overview ==
The Binnu Utaki is locatedon a 165.6 meter high hill about one kilometer east of the Shuri Castle ruins, on the eastern edge of the Shuri neighborhood and is the highest point in Naha City. The area is divided into Ufutaki to the north and Kotaki to the south by a road running east-west. It was a popular pilgrimage site as well as a place where the king himself visited or where worshippers on his behalf visited. In 1519, King Shō Shin, the third king of the Ryūkyū Kingdom, constructed the Ufutaki Stone Gate. In 1543, the fourth king, King Shō Sei, constructed a stone-paved pilgrimage path from Shuri Castle. The name of the deity at Otake is said to be "Tama no Miujisu Delkawa no Miibezukasa," and that at Kotake is "Son of Heaven" (Ryūkyū-koku yurai-ki). At Kotake, there was a place of worship for the "Son of Heaven," and next to it, there was also a place for remote worship for the Sefa-utaki. In the 18th century, the area was recognized as an important location for Shuri Castle in terms of feng shui, and pine trees were planted along the approach. The site was severely damaged in the 1945 Battle of Okinawa in World War II, and the current stone gate is a post-war reconstruction. The site was excavated in 2013.

== See also ==
- List of Historic Sites of Japan (Okinawa)
