= Yonabaru, Okinawa =

Yonabaru 与那原町
- Town
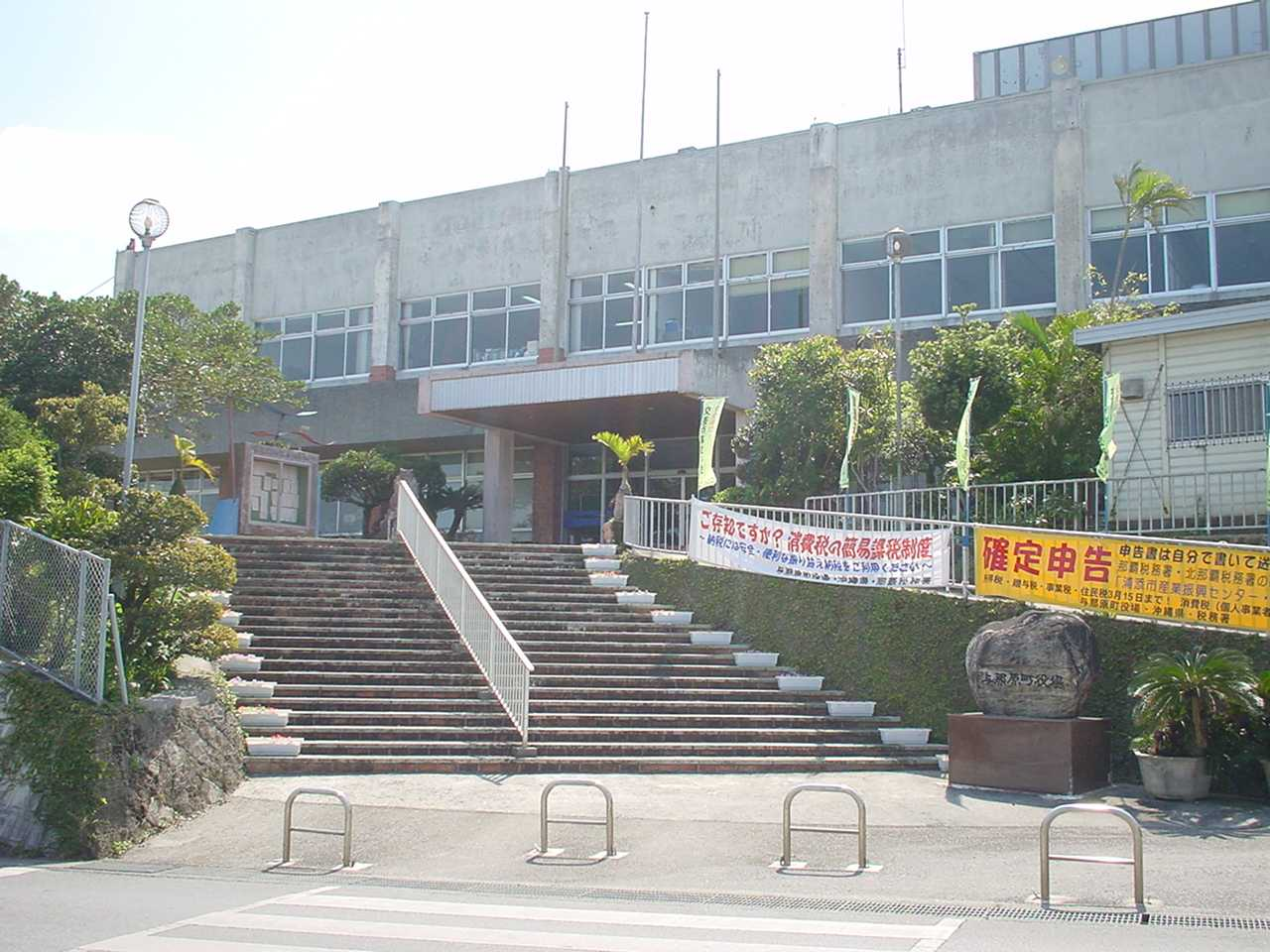
- Yonabaru Town Office

- Flag Seal

- Location of Yonabaru in Okinawa Prefecture

- Location in Japan
- Coordinates: 26°11′58″N 127°45′17″E
- Country: Japan
- Region: Okinawa
- Prefecture: Okinawa Prefecture
- District: Shimajiri
- Foundation: 1 April 1949

Area
  - Total: 5.18 km^{2} (2.00 sq mi)

Population (2024)
  - Total: 19,817
  - Density: 3,825/km^{2} (9,910/sq mi)
- Time zone: UTC+09:00 (JST)
- City hall address: 16 Ueyonabaru, Yonabaru-chō, Shimajiri-gun; 901-1392
- Website: www.town.yonabaru.okinawa.jp (in Japanese)
- Symbols
- Fish: Japanese seabream
- Flower: Hibiscus
- Tree: Black ebony (Diospyros ferrea)

Yonabaru (与那原町, Yonabaru-chō; Okinawan: Yunabaru) is a town in Shimajiri District, Okinawa Prefecture, Japan. It is located at the southern end of Okinawa Island, on the east coast, overlooking Nakagusuku Bay.

As of 2024, the town has a population of 19,817 and a population density of 3,825 persons per km^{2}. The total area is 5.18 km^{2}, making it the second smallest municipality in Okinawa.

== Geography ==
Yonabaru is located 9 km east of Naha City, on the eastern coast of the southern part of Okinawa Island, along Nakagusuku Bay. With an area of 5.18 km^{2}, it is the smallest municipality on Okinawa Island, and the second smallest in Okinawa Prefecture after Tonaki Village.

The town is bordered on the south-east by a forest on a low hill (133m) called Amagoimui (雨乞森) and on the northwest by another called Untamamui (運玉森, 158 m). It mainly develops on flat lands between those hills and Nakagusuku Bay.

The social banditry that took place in Untamamui is famous in Okinawa through the story of Untama Girū. It was dramatized in a film (Untama Girū) that received the Newcomer Award of the Directors Guild of Japan in 1989 and the Caligari Filmpreis Award at the Berlin International Film Festival in 1990.

=== Location ===
Until the Second World War, Yonabaru had a good natural harbour on Nakagusuku Bay, used by Yanbaru-sen ships. It was an important place for marine transportation and trade on the eastern coast of Okinawa Island. It was also an important junction point for the land transportation both toward the southern and central parts of the island (Shimajiri and Nakagami). However, after the war, it lost its harbour town characteristic.

It is still nowadays an important junction point between the southern and central parts of the island for land transportation on the eastern coast.

=== Topography and Geology ===
If you exclude the land reclaimed on the sea, the topographical and geological features of the town can be divided into two groups. Most of the town corresponds to low hills of mudstone and sandstone of the Tertiary Shimajiri Group, with coastal lowlands along Nakagusuku Bay. However, at the boundary with Ōzato (Nanjō City), around the Ōzato Castle Site Park, Ryūkyū limestone can be observed covering the strata of the Shimajiri Group.

As a consequence of this geological characteristics, most of the soils in the town are of the jāgaru type. Jāgaru soils are adapted to the cultivation of sugar cane. The muddy earth is also used as a resource for the red roof tiles that are a main production of the town.

=== Coastal Area ===
Until land was reclaimed on the sea, the coast was an area with quiet waves on Nakagusuku Bay, without much coral reef development. Until the Second World War, it was a spot fit for sea bathing with many nice sand beaches but since the water was really shallow, land started to be reclaimed on the sea after the war. This development on the sea still continues nowadays, with the development of the Nakagusuku Bay Harbour Marine Town Project conjointly with the neighbouring town of Nishihara.

=== Climate ===
The town, as the rest of Okinawa Island, has a subtropical climate, with really small seasonal temperature variations. The mean temperature is of 22.3 °C, the mean annual rainfall is of 1688 mm, with rainfalls mainly in spring and summer, although they can sometimes start earlier. Typhoons mainly come in summer and autumn.

=== Administrative divisions ===
The town includes four wards with twelve settlements.

- Agarihama (東浜)
- Itarashiki (板良敷)
  - Itarashiki (板良敷)
  - Tōsoe (当添)
- Ueyonabaru (上与那原)
- Yonabaru (与那原)
  - Eguchi (江口)
  - Hamada (浜田)
  - Mījima (新島)
  - Minato (港)
  - Morishita (森下)
  - Nakashima (中島)
  - Ōmitake (大見武)
  - Yōbaru (与原)

=== Neighbouring municipalities ===
- Haebaru
- Nanjō
- Nishihara

=== Demographics ===
Census data
Year	Pop.	±%
1950	6,574	—
1955	7,318	+11.3%
1960	8,234	+12.5%
1965	8,740	+6.1%
1970	9,639	+10.3%
1975	12,017	+24.7%
1980	12,752	+6.1%
1985	13,311	+4.4%
1990	14,009	+5.2%
1995	14,850	+6.0%
2000	15,109	+1.7%
2005	15,343	+1.5%
2010	16,318	+6.4%
2015	18,410	+12.8%
Source: Statistics Bureau

== History ==
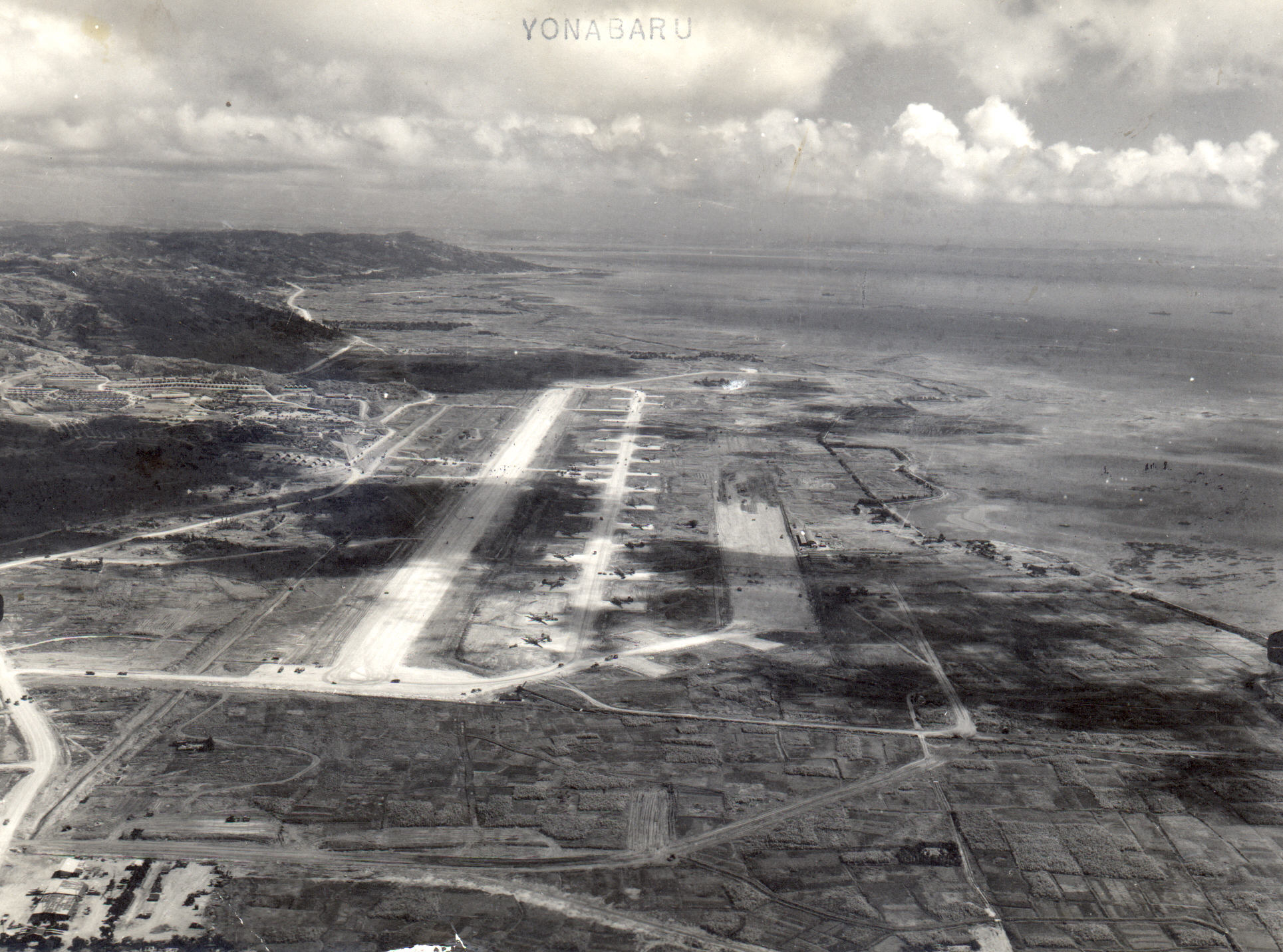
Aerial view of the former Yonabaru Airfield

References to the area represented by the modern town of Yonabaru may be found in the Omoro Sōshi, which makes mention of "Yonaharu" and "Yonaha-bama". According to the Chūzan Seifu (中山世譜), Shō Hashi, before becoming king, acquired iron from foreign ships that came to Yonabaru to trade, forged from this metal tools for farming, and gave these to the people.

Formerly part of Ōzato Magiri, with the abolition of the magiri in 1908, the area of Yonabaru became part of Ōzato Village. A railway line to Naha opened in 1914 and with it came a period of economic growth. Talk during the early Shōwa period of separate municipal status was interrupted by the Pacific War and the foundation of Yonabaru Town had to wait until 1 April 1949.

== Events ==
Yonabaru big tug-of-war is the biggest traditional event in Yonabaru town that is held to pray for a bountiful harvest, good health, and the prosperity of future generations. The origin is said to date back to the 1500s, and it has a history of more than 450 years. It is known as one of the three major Okinawan tug-of -war events, along side Naha city and Itoman city. The big rope weighs approximately 5 metric tons and is about 90 meters long. Carrying this big rope to the festival grounds is called “Michi-Juneh”(道ジュネ―). This is one of the festival’s highlights. The signal that the competition has begun is the moment, a stick called the “Kanachi stick” is inserted to join the two team’s big ropes together. This method is unique to Yonabaru town.

== Cultural and natural assets ==
Yonabaru Town lists sixty-three tangible cultural properties and monuments, including nine ones designated or registered at the national, prefectural or municipal level.

- Name (Japanese) (Type of registration)

=== Cultural Properties ===
- Kuran Garden (クラン庭)
- Peace Memorial in Morishita (森下 平和之塔)
- Sanshin, Makabi type, inscribed "Nishihira" (三線真壁型銘西平) (Prefectural)
- Tāta Aji's Tomb (多和田按司墓)
- War Victims Memorial in Itarashiki (板良敷 慰霊塔)
- War Victims Memorial in Morishita (森下 慰霊塔)
- Young Cherry Tree Memorial (Japan Army War Victims Memorial) (若桜の塔)

=== Folk Cultural Properties ===
- Achiri-gā spring (阿知利ガー)
- Achiri Yūnushi Praying Site (阿知利世主)
- Agarina Ufusu Praying Site (東名大主)
- Eguchi Uganju Praying Site (江口拝所)
- Fire lion of Ueyonabaru (上与那原 火の獅子)
- Fukashiku-kā spring (フカシク井)
- Funerary palanquin house (site) of Tōsoe (当添 ガン屋 (跡))
- Hi-nu-kan fire god altar of Ueyonabaru (上与那原 火の神)
- Hirata-kā spring (平田井)
- Hōmishizā Rocks Praying Site (ホーミシザー)
- Ibi-nu-mē Praying Site in Itarashiki (板良敷 イビ之前)
- Ijina Tun Praying Site (イジナ殿)
- Itarashiki Iri-nu-kā spring (site) (板良敷 西之井 (跡))
- Itarashiki Kuruhiji-kā spring (板良敷 クルヒジ井)
- Itarashiki Noro Tun Praying Site (板良敷 ノロ殿)
- Itarashiki Tomushi-kā spring (板良敷トムシ井)
- Itarashiki Uii-nu-kā spring (板良敷 上之井)
- Kubadō Praying Site (久場塘)
- Kufadō Sacred Site (久葉堂) (Municipal)
- Kumukujii Rock Sacred Site (久茂久岩) (Municipal)
- Michindaki Sacred Site (三津武嶽) (Municipal)
- Mī-ga spring (新井)
- Miyā Residence Praying Site in Itarashiki (板良敷 新屋)
- Naka-no-utaki Sacred Site in Tōsoe (当添 中の御嶽)
- Noro Dunchi Praying Site (祝女殿内)
- North stone lion of Itarashiki (板良敷 北の石獅子)
- Nūru-gā spring Praying Site (祝女井)
- Ōmitake Nāka-nu-kā spring (大見武 ナーカヌカー)
- Ōmitake well/Ufunchiyaki well (大見武 井戸)
- Sou-nu-mashi Praying Site (宗之増)
- Stone Lion 1 of Mījima (新島 石獅子①)
- Stone lion 1 of Nakashima (中島 石獅子①)
- Stone Lion 2 of Mījima (新島 石獅子②)
- Stone lion 2 of Nakashima (中島 石獅子②)
- Stone lion 3 of Nakashima (中島 石獅子③)
- Stone lion of Ōmitake (大見武の石獅子)
- Takikura Tun Praying Site (タキクラ殿)
- Tomari Rock in Itarashiki (板良敷 泊岩)
- Tōsoe Shicha-nu-kā spring (当添 下の井)
- Tōsoe Uii-nu-kā spring (当添 上ヌ井)
- Uchibarushii Praying Site in Itarashiki (板良敷 内原子)
- Udun'yama Praying Site in Yōbaru (与原 御殿山) (Municipal)
- Uē-gā spring (親川) (Municipal)
- Ueyonabaru Mē-nu-kā spring (上与那原 前の井) (Municipal)
- Ueyonabaru Tun Praying Site (上与那原 殿)
- Ueyonabaru Uii-nu-kā spring (上与那原 上ヌ井)
- Ueyonabaru well (上与那原 井戸)
- Uii-nu-tun Praying Site in Morishita (森下 上之殿)
- Ujōro Praying Site (ウジョー口)
- Usachi Ryūgū Shrine (ウサチ龍宮神)
- Ūshi-nu-mē Praying Site (ウーシヌ前)
- Ushita-kā spring Praying Site (ウシタ井)
- Utaki Sacred Site / Yamagwā Sacred Site (御嶽・山グヮー)
- Yonamine Tun Praying Site (与那嶺殿)

=== Historic Sites ===
- Okinawa Prefectural Railways Yonabaru Station Site (沖縄県鉄道与那原駅跡) (National)

=== Natural Monuments ===
- Large bishop wood tree of Kufadō Sacred Site (久葉堂の大アカギ) (Municipal)
