= Sashiki, Okinawa =

Dissolved municipality in Shimajiri District, Okinawa Prefecture

Sashiki (佐敷町, Sashiki-chō; Okinawan:サシチ, Sasici) was a town located in Shimajiri District, Okinawa Prefecture, Japan.

== Population ==
As of 2003, the town had an estimated population of 11,481 and with a density of 1,083 persons per km^{2}. The total area was 10.60 km^{2}.

== History ==
Shō Shishō, founder of the First Shō Dynasty of the Ryukyu Kingdom, ruled Sashiki Magiri from Sashiki Castle from the late 14th century until 1407.

On January 1, 2006, Sashiki, along with the villages of Chinen, Ōzato and Tamagusuku (all from Shimajiri District), was merged to create the city of Nanjō.
