= Noro (priestess) =

Priestess of the Ryukyuan religion

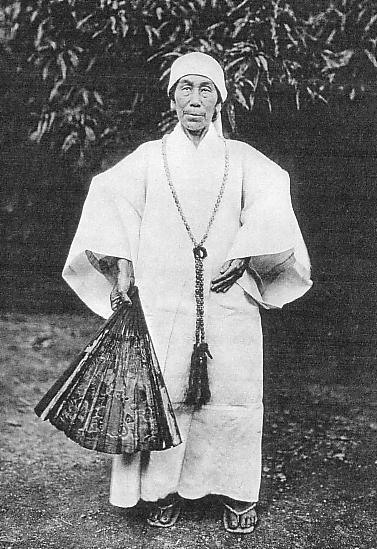
A noro priestess in traditional clothes

Noro (祝女, sometimes 神女 or 巫女) (Okinawan: ヌール, romanized: nuuru) are priestesses of the Ryukyuan religion at Utaki. They have existed since at least the beginning of the Gusuku period (late 12th century) and continue to perform rituals even today. They are distinct from yuta (psychics), but are classified as kaminchu ("godly people").

== History ==
According to the Chūzan Seikan and Chūzan Seifu, the first noro were the daughters of Tentei-shi, who was a descendant of the creation goddess, Amamikyu. The first daughter became the first royal priestess (聞得大君, kikoe-ōgimi) (chifi-ufujin), and the second daughter became the first village priestess (noro). The god of fire gave a piece of fire from Ryūgū-jō to each noro to create a village hearth, from which each family in the village would take fire to maintain their own family hearths. The kikoe-ōgimi maintained the royal hearth. The noro were charged with conducting official rituals and ceremonies for their respective village. The kikoe-ōgimi was charged with conducting rituals and ceremonies on behalf of the entire kingdom, and traveled with the king to Sefa-utaki to worship Amamikyu.

Upon taking the throne in 1469, King Shō En made his sister the Chief noro of his home of Izena, and his daughter kikoe-ōgimi. During the reign of Shō Shin (r. 1477–1526), the priestess system was centralized under the kikoe-ōgimi's authority and a noro was assigned to every village in the kingdom. The kikoe-ōgimi also had a new residence built near Shuri Castle so she could maintain the Sonohyan-utaki.

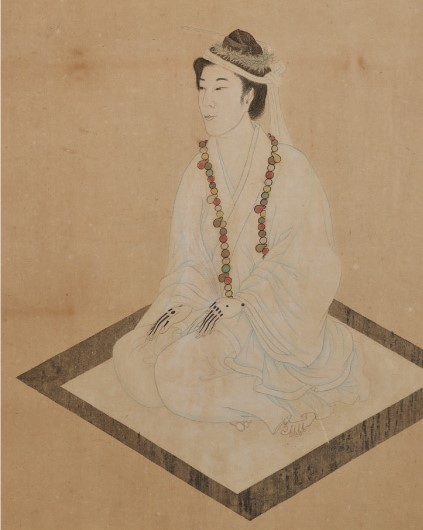
Painting of a Noro, her hands decorated with hajichi tattoos, Second Sho Dynasty, circa 19th century

After the 1609 invasion by Satsuma, Confucian thought entered the Ryukyuan government and began eroding the authority of the priestesses. Satsuma placed a demand on the Ryukyuan government that women were forbidden to own land; however, the government ignored this demand in respect to the noro. Shō Shōken, acting as Prime Minister of Ryukyu, convinced the king to stop or scale down a number of religious rituals and ceremonies in the name of saving money and minimizing aspects of Ryukyuan culture that might seem "backwards" to Satsuma, such as the king and kikoe-ōgimi's pilgrimage to Sefa-utaki. However, local village priestesses still retained influence and power until the end of the 19th century.

After Japan annexed the Ryukyu Kingdom in 1879, the Meiji government began attempts at absorbing the Ryukyuan religion into State Shinto. The priestesses and their shrines were co-opted by the government and registered. The noro were prohibited from being recognized as part of the Shinto priesthood and, unlike their Shinto counterparts, were not guaranteed protection by the state. Furthermore, the government abolished their salaries. While the government was unable to confiscate noro land, in 1910 their land were commuted to monetary stipends which were then limited in use to exclude personal expense, leaving the noro with no government income. Then-Governor of Okinawa Prefecture Hibi Shigeaki stated that this limitation on the use of noro land stipends was "for the maintenance of noro lands [...] for their eventual reclassification into [Shinto] shrines." As the influence of noro declined, the popularity of yuta increased.

The chaos of the Battle of Okinawa severely reduced and scattered Okinawa's population, which further minimized the function of the noro. Noro today only exist in rural villages and at utaki sites.

== Kikoe-ōgimi ==
The kikoe-ōgimi (聞得大君) (Okinawan: chifi-ufujin) served as the priestess for the Ryukyu Kingdom and the royal family. She conducted national ceremonies, oversaw all other noro priestesses, and maintained the royal hearth and the most sacred utaki. The inauguration ceremony, uarauri (御新下り), of a new kikoe-ōgimi was held at Seifa-utaki. The ceremony represented the holy marriage between Amamikyu and Shinerikyu. Religiously, the holy marriage gave the kikoe-ōgimi spiritual power supported by kimitezuri (君手摩). After she was inaugurated, she stayed in the position until her death. The position was abolished along with the kingdom in 1879; however, the last kikoe-ōgimi continued her role until her death in 1944.

== Noro duties and responsibilities ==
Noro were responsible for maintaining the village hearth and helping to establish new households. They primarily conducted rituals and ceremonies for their respective village at a local utaki. Girls from each family in a village were assigned to be the noro's assistant, although men could also be assistants for public ceremonies. Noro also communicated with and channeled ancestors and deities.

== Symbols ==
Noro are most recognizable by their white robes and headdress, which symbolize spiritual purity. They also wear or carry beads and a magatama stone. The noro's hearth includes three stones teepee-ed together; the stones always come from the shore.

== Hierarchy ==
Priestess hierarchy
Title	Description
Kikoe-ōgimi (聞得大君, Okinawan: chifi ufujin)	Royal priestess, a blood relative of the king, residing in Shuri.
Izena noro	Directly ruled Izena Magiri.
Kudaka noro	Directly ruled Kudaka Island.
Mihara-oamu-shirare	Priestesses in charge of the three districts of Kunigami, Nakagami, and Shimajiri.
Noro	Village or magiri priestess.
Assistants	Typically a girl representing a family in a village or a noro-in-training, but can be a man for public ceremonies.
