= Nanjō =

City in Okinawa Prefecture, Japan

Nanjō 南城市
- City
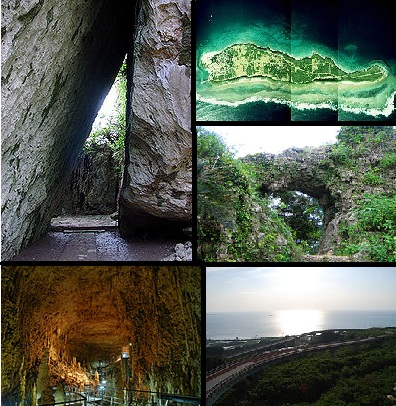
- Clockwise from top left: Sefa-utaki, Kudaka Island, site of Tamagusuku Castle, Nirai-kanai Bridge, Gyokusen Cave

- Flag Seal

- Location of Nanjo in Okinawa Prefecture

- Location within Japan
- Coordinates: 26°9′47″N 127°46′14″E
- Country: Japan
- Region: Kyushu (Ryukyu)
- Prefecture: Okinawa Prefecture

Government
  - Mayor: Keishun Koja

Area
  - Total: 49.94 km^{2} (19.28 sq mi)

Population (April 30, 2024)
  - Total: 46,690
  - Density: 934.92/km^{2} (2,421.4/sq mi)
- Time zone: UTC+9 (Japan Standard Time)
- Tree: Ebony
- Flower: Hibiscus
- Flowering tree: Common gardenia
- Fish: Grouper
- Shellfish: Silver-mouth turban
- Phone number: 098-948-7111
- Address: 143 Fusato, Tamagusuku, Nanjō-shi 901-0695
- Climate: Cfa
- Website: www.city.nanjo.okinawa.jp (in Japanese)

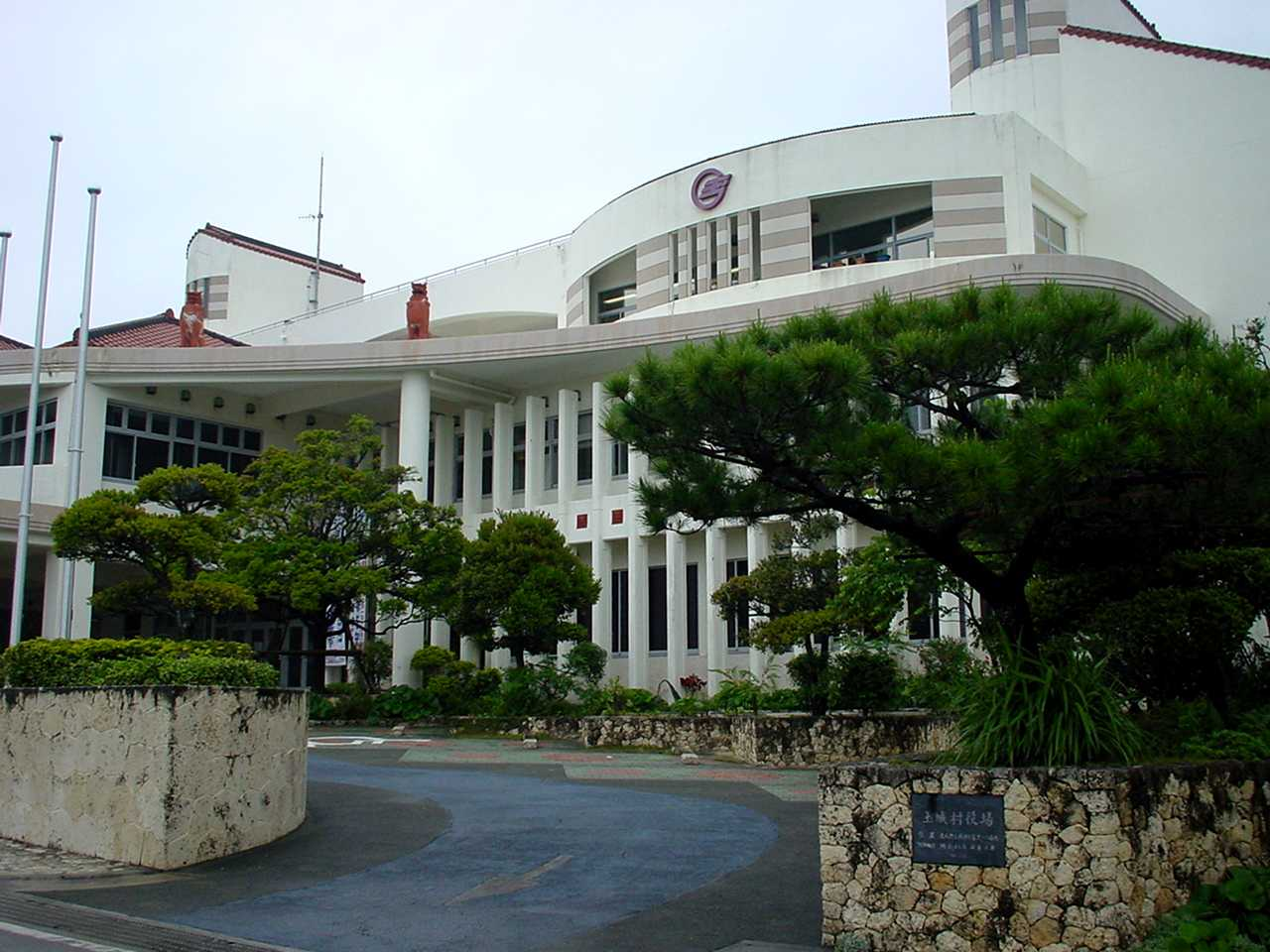
Nanjō city hall

Nanjō (Japanese: 南城市, Hepburn: Nanjō-shi) is a city located in the southern part of Okinawa Island in Okinawa Prefecture, Japan. Translated literally, the name Nanjō means "southern castle". Many castle ruins, called gusuku in the Okinawan language, can be found throughout the city. The modern city of Nanjō was established on January 1, 2006, from the merger of the town of Sashiki, and the villages of Chinen, Ōzato and Tamagusuku (all from Shimajiri District). Nanjō has an area of 49.94 km² and, on the date of its inception, a population of 46,690, and a density of 934.92 per km².

Of the eleven cities in Okinawa Prefecture, Nanjō has the smallest population. It does not have a separate police station nor a high school. For those services, citizens have to refer to the neighbouring towns of Yonabaru and Yaese. The city hosts a fire station responsible for Chinen, Ōzato and Tamagusuku and parts of Yaese, while Sashiki is served by a separate station. The city's main economic activities are agriculture and tourism. Important crops include sugarcane, for sugar and vinegar production, and turmeric, a popular medicinal herb in Okinawa. Several turmeric processing plants are based in the city, producing semi-processed goods to be used by industries on the mainland or consumer products like tea and dietary supplements.

== Historical facts ==
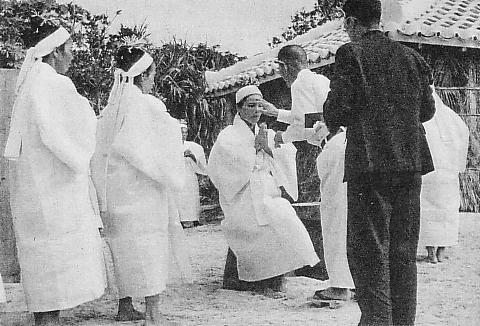
Izaiho traditional event in 1954

- Shō Hashi lived in Sashiki Castle before uniting the Ryukyu Kingdom.
- 1908 (Meiji Era, year 41) - By an Imperial Edict, the Magiri system is abolished and the villages of Chinen, Ōzato, Sashiki and Tamagusuku are created.
- 1945 (Showa Era, year 20) - After the Battle of Okinawa, Chinen is given the status of city by the occupying American Army. In the following year, it reverts to being a village.
- 1949 (Showa Era, year 24) - The districts (字) of Yonabaru, Ueyonabaru and Itarashiki are severed from the village of Ōzato to form the new village of Yonabaru.
- 1980 (Showa Era, year 55) - Sashiki receives the status of town.
- 2005 (Heisei Era, year 17), March - The name Nanjō-shi was selected for the soon to be founded city.
- 2006 (Heisei Era, year 18), January 1 - Foundation of the city of Nanjō.

== Geography ==
Nanjō is a city located in the southern region of Okinawa's main island. The isle of Kudaka, off the coast of Chinen, also belongs to the city.

=== Administrative divisions ===
- Chinen (知念)
  - Azama (安座真)
  - Umino (海野)
  - Gushiken (具志堅)
  - Kudaka (久高)
  - Kudeken (久手堅)
  - Kuhara (久原)
  - Shikiya (志喜屋)
  - China (知名)
  - Chinen (知念)
  - Yamazato (山里)
  - Yoshitomi (吉富)
- Ōzato (大里)
  - Furugen (古堅)
  - Inamine (稲嶺)
  - Minei (嶺井)
  - Nakama (仲間)
  - Ōzato (大里)
  - Ōshiro (大城)
  - Takahira (高平)
- Sashiki (佐敷)
  - Fusozaki (富祖崎)
  - Ibara (伊原)
  - Kaneku (兼久)
  - Nakaiho (仲伊保)
  - Okoku (小谷)
  - Sashiki (佐敷)
  - Shinkai (新開)
  - Shinzato (新里)
  - Tedokon (手登根)
  - Tsuhako (津波古)
  - Yabiku (屋比久)
- Tamagusuku (玉城)
  - Aichi (愛地)
  - Funakosi (船越)
  - Fusato (富里)
  - Horikawa (堀川)
  - Hyakuna (百名)
  - Itokazu (糸数)
  - Kakinohana (垣花)
  - Kibaru (喜良原)
  - Maekawa (前川)
  - Nakayama (中山)
  - Nakandakari (仲村渠)
  - Ō (奥武)
  - Oyakebaru (親慶原)
  - Shikenbaru (志堅原)
  - Tamagusuku (玉城)
  - Tōyama (當山)
  - Yakabu (屋嘉部)

=== Surrounding municipalities ===
- Haebaru
- Yaese
- Yonabaru

=== Climate ===
Climate data for Itokazu, Nanjō (1991−2020 normals, extremes 1977−present)
Month	Jan	Feb	Mar	Apr	May	Jun	Jul	Aug	Sep	Oct	Nov	Dec	Year
Record high °C (°F)	25.0 (77.0)	26.2 (79.2)	26.5 (79.7)	28.6 (83.5)	31.5 (88.7)	32.0 (89.6)	34.3 (93.7)	36.1 (97.0)	33.9 (93.0)	31.9 (89.4)	28.4 (83.1)	26.6 (79.9)	36.1 (97.0)
Mean daily maximum °C (°F)	18.5 (65.3)	19.0 (66.2)	20.6 (69.1)	22.9 (73.2)	25.6 (78.1)	28.2 (82.8)	30.5 (86.9)	30.6 (87.1)	29.5 (85.1)	26.9 (80.4)	23.7 (74.7)	20.2 (68.4)	24.7 (76.4)
Daily mean °C (°F)	15.5 (59.9)	15.8 (60.4)	17.3 (63.1)	19.7 (67.5)	22.5 (72.5)	25.4 (77.7)	27.2 (81.0)	27.1 (80.8)	26.0 (78.8)	23.6 (74.5)	20.6 (69.1)	17.2 (63.0)	21.5 (70.7)
Mean daily minimum °C (°F)	13.3 (55.9)	13.4 (56.1)	14.9 (58.8)	17.3 (63.1)	20.2 (68.4)	23.5 (74.3)	25.2 (77.4)	25.0 (77.0)	23.9 (75.0)	21.5 (70.7)	18.6 (65.5)	15.1 (59.2)	19.3 (66.8)
Record low °C (°F)	4.1 (39.4)	4.9 (40.8)	6.3 (43.3)	10.1 (50.2)	13.3 (55.9)	14.7 (58.5)	19.6 (67.3)	21.2 (70.2)	17.9 (64.2)	14.8 (58.6)	11.2 (52.2)	7.9 (46.2)	4.1 (39.4)
Average precipitation mm (inches)	101.6 (4.00)	119.7 (4.71)	141.8 (5.58)	164.4 (6.47)	243.7 (9.59)	289.4 (11.39)	154.3 (6.07)	181.9 (7.16)	218.6 (8.61)	169.1 (6.66)	118.2 (4.65)	126.2 (4.97)	2,028.9 (79.88)
Average precipitation days (≥ 1.0 mm)	11.1	10.8	12.1	11.1	12.3	12.1	9.7	11.5	12.0	10.0	9.5	9.8	132
Mean monthly sunshine hours	95.0	94.1	115.7	116.4	127.9	141.4	238.3	211.9	179.5	169.7	124.1	107.4	1,714
Source: Japan Meteorological Agency

== Tourism and culture ==
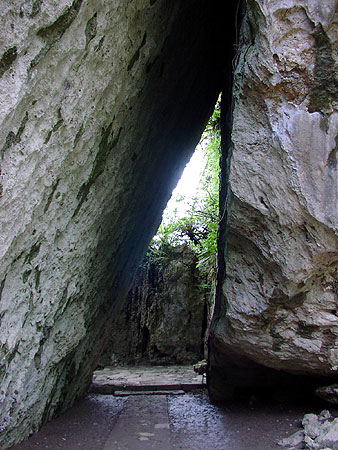
Sefa-utaki

Located in Chinen, the seifa-utaki shrine is listed by UNESCO as part of the Gusuku Sites and Related Properties of the Kingdom of Ryukyu World Heritage Site. It was believed to be a sacred place, from where one could see the "Isle of the Gods". In the shrine, noro priestesses from Shuri Castle would pray for the well-being of the king and the kingdom.

In Tamagusuku, the Gyokusendō cave is known for its stalagmites and stalactites. Discovered in 1967, the cave is estimated to be at least five kilometers long, but only 890 metres are open to tourists. The cave is located inside the Okinawa World cultural theme park. Other attractions of the theme park are the Habu snake museum, native dances such as Eisa, and a traditional Ryūkyū-style village with traditional red-clay roofed houses and workshops for local crafts such as dying and weaving, pottery, and glass blowing.

Also located in Tamagusuku, the Itokazu-Abuchiragama cave was used in World War II as a bomb shelter by soldiers and civilians alike. It is also open to tourists. Himeyuri students were used as nurses in this location among others.

The isle of Kudaka, also called Isle of the Gods, can be accessed from Azama Port, located in Chinen.

From the isle of Ōjima, in Tamagusuku, one can board a glass-bottomed boat, a boat with a transparent floor used in marine-life observations.

Golf is a popular sport in Okinawa, and the Ryūkyū Golf Club in Nanjō has three 27-hole courses. Every spring, the Ryūkyū Golf Club welcomes the Daikin Orchid Ladies Golf Tournament.

The Nanjo Sightseeing Information Center and souvenir shop across the street have cardboard cut-outs of the characters of The Aquatope on White Sand, with the shop including an "entire Aquatope corner."

=== Gusuku in Nanjō ===
- Chinen Castle
- Kakinohana Castle
- Ōzato Castle
- Sashiki Castle
- Tamagusuku Castle

=== Beaches ===
- Azama Sansan Beach
- Hyakuna Beach
- Mībaru Beach

== Cultural and natural assets ==
Nanjō City hosts sixty-two designated or registered cultural properties and monuments, at the national, prefectural or municipal level.

- Name (Japanese) (Type of registration)

=== Cultural Properties ===
- Artefacts excavated from Sefa Utaki (沖縄県斎場御嶽出土品) (National)
- Chichingā spring (チチンガー) (Municipal)
- Chinen Castle Site (知念城跡) (Prefectural)
- Chinen Residence (pig pen latrines) (旧知念家 フール) (National)
- Irei Residence (main house) (旧伊礼家 住宅主屋) (National)
- Kakinohana Shitakarī Family's ancient documents (垣花勢高殿家古文書) (Municipal)
- Kyan Residence (main house) (旧喜屋武家 住宅主屋) (National)
- Letters incinerator of Hyakuna (百名の焚字炉) (Municipal)
- Meiji Land Registry Map (明治土地台帳附属地図) (Municipal)
- Nakandakari Hījā spring (仲村渠樋川) (National)
- Shimashii Ōzato Aji's tomb (島添大里按司の墓) (Municipal)
- Taba Residence (main house) (旧田場家 住宅主屋) (National)
- Uezato Residence (main house) (旧上里家 住宅主屋) (National)
- Ufugusuku Anji's tomb (Bountu-ufaka) (大城按司の墓/ボウントゥ御墓 (ウファカ)) (Prefectural)

=== Folk Cultural Properties ===
- Chankudun Sacred Site (喜屋武久殿) (Municipal)
- Fucchā Stone (フッチャー石) (Municipal)
- Iimui Utaki Sacred Site (食栄森御嶽) (Municipal)
- Nzatu-gā spring (美里井) (Municipal)
- Okoku Ii-nu-kā spring (小谷上の井) (Municipal)
- Okoku Naka-nu-kā spring (小谷中の井) (Municipal)
- Okoku Shimo-nu-kā spring (小谷下茂の井) (Municipal)
- Paved road of Okoku (小谷石畳道) (Municipal)
- Stone lion of Chinen (知念のシーサー) (Municipal)
- Stone lion of Gushiken (具志堅のシーサー) (Municipal)
- Stone lion of Haebaru (南風原の石彫魔除獅子) (Municipal)
- Tūtiikun / Buddha statue of Tedokon (手登根土帝君・仏像) (Municipal)
- Tūtiikun Sacred Site of Shinzato (新里土帝君) (Municipal)
- Yaharazukasa Sacred Site (ヤハラヅカサ) (Municipal)

=== Historic Sites ===
- China Ukkā spring (知名御川) (Municipal)
- Chinen Aji's tomb (知念按司の墓) (Municipal)
- Chinen Castle Site (知念城跡) (National)
- Funakoshi Gusuku (船越グスク) (Municipal)
- Gushiken Hījā spring (具志堅の樋川) (Municipal)
- Hamagā Utaki Sacred Site (浜川御嶽) (Municipal)
- Itokazu Castle Site (糸数城跡) (National)
- Kakinohana Castle Site (垣花城跡) (Prefectural)
- Kamiyama Tun Sacred Site (神山の殿) (Municipal)
- Kancha Ukkā spring (カンチャ大川) (Municipal)
- Kubō Utaki Sacred Site on Kudaka Island (久高島クボー御嶽) (Municipal)
- Minton Gusuku (ミントングスク) (Prefectural)
- Nāshiru Ufuyā's Residence Site (苗代大比屋の屋敷跡) (Municipal)
- Ōshiro Castle Site (大城城跡) (Municipal)
- Sashiki Castle Site (佐敷城跡) (National)
- Sashiki Yōdore mausoleum (佐敷ようどれ) (Prefectural)
- Sefa Utaki (斎場御嶽) (National)
- Shikiya Gusuku (志喜屋グスク) (Municipal)
- Shimashī-Ōzato Castle Site (島添大里城跡) (National)
- Tamagusuku Castle Site (玉城城跡) (National)
- Teda Ukkā sacred spring (テダ御川) (Municipal)
- Tsukishiro Rock / Tsukishiro-nu-kā spring (つきしろの岩・つきしろの井) (Municipal)
- Ukinjuhainju sacred springs (受水走水) (Municipal)

=== Places of scenic beauty ===
- Amamiku-nu-mui (Kudaka-no-Fubō-utaki) (アマミクヌムイ (久高コハウ森/久高のフボー御嶽)) (National)
- Amamiku-nu-mui (Sefa Utaki) (アマミクヌムイ (斎場御嶽)) (National)
- Amamiku-nu-mui (Tamagusuku Amatsutsu) (アマミクヌムイ (玉城アマツゝ/玉城グスク)) (National)
- Sefa Utaki (斎場御嶽) (Prefectural)

=== Natural Monuments ===
- Deer fossils discovery point in Shichaībaru (下上原の鹿化石出土地) (Municipal)
- Dwarf mock orange tree (Deutzia naseana Nakai var. amanoi) Plant Community
- Fusozaki Coast Myoporum bontioides community in Sashiki (佐敷敷町冨祖崎海岸のハマジンチョウ群落) (Prefectural)
- Group of fukugi trees in Chinin Ē-gā spring (知念親川のフクギ群) (Municipal)
- Gyokusendō Cave (玉泉洞) (Municipal)
- Kudaka Island coastal plant community (久高島の海岸植物群落) (National)
- Large bishop wood tree in Kudeken (久手堅の大アカギ) (Municipal)
- Looking-glass mangrove tree in Mīya Residence (新屋のサキシマスオウノキ) (Municipal)
- Looking-glass mangrove tree in Ufu Dunchi Residence (大殿内のサキシマスオウノキ) (Municipal)
- Looking-glass mangrove tree in Ufujō Praying Site (大門のサキシマスオウノキ) (Municipal)

== Sister cities ==
- (Japan) Tamaki, Mie since 1993

In kanji, Tamaki has the same spelling as Tamagusuku (玉城). Neither name follows the standard readings for the kanji in Japanese.

== Access ==
Passengers traveling from mainland Japan and overseas arrive at Naha Airport. Several bus lines serve the city of Nanjo, departing from the bus terminals at Naha and Itoman.
