= Kakinohana Castle =

Coordinates: 26°08′53.425″N 127°47′34.077″E

Kakinohana Castle 垣花城
- Nanjō, Okinawa
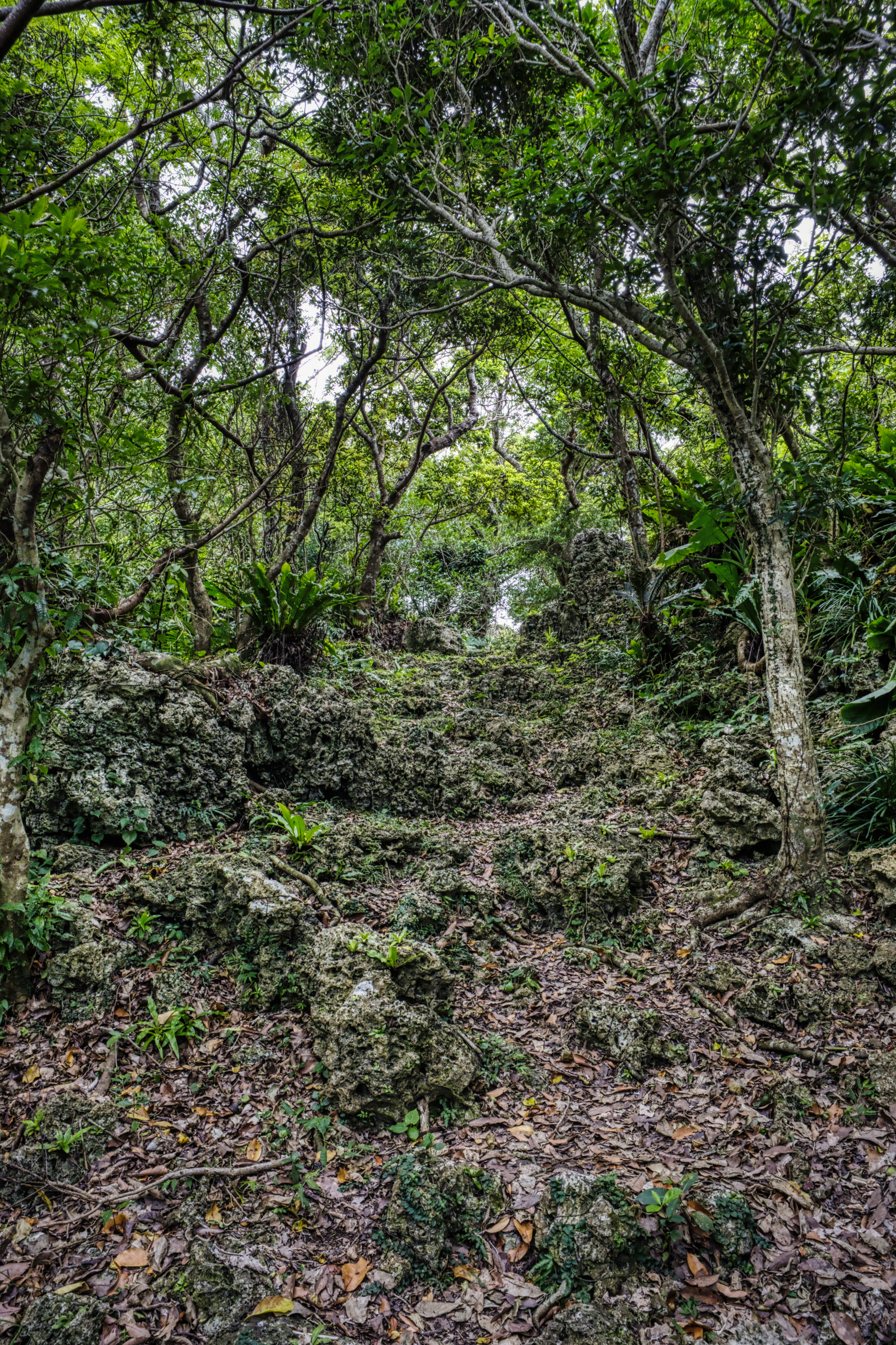
- Ruins of Kakinohana Castle

Site information
- Type: Gusuku
- Controlled by: Ryūkyū Kingdom (early 15th century–1879); Empire of Japan (1879–1945); United States Military Government of the Ryukyu Islands(1945-1950); United States Civil Administration of the Ryukyu Islands(1950-1972); Japan(1972-present)
- Open to the public: yes
- Condition: Ruins

Location

Site history
- Materials: Ryukyuan limestone, wood

Kakinohana Castle (垣花城, Kakinohana jō; Okinawan: Kachinuhana Gushiku) is a Ryukyuan gusuku in Nanjō, Okinawa.

== Description ==
Kakinohana Castle is a kuruwa style fortification on a hill overlooking the Pacific Ocean. The stone walls are built in the nozura (stacked stone) style. No accurate details of the construction of this castle exist, but legend states it that it was built by the second son of Minton Aji, an Okinawan ruler around the 14th century.

The castle is noted for having a spring, the Kakinohana Spring (垣花樋川, Kakinohana hija).
