= Shimajiri District, Okinawa =

District in Okinawa prefecture, Japan

Coordinates: 26°10′34″N 127°43′21″E

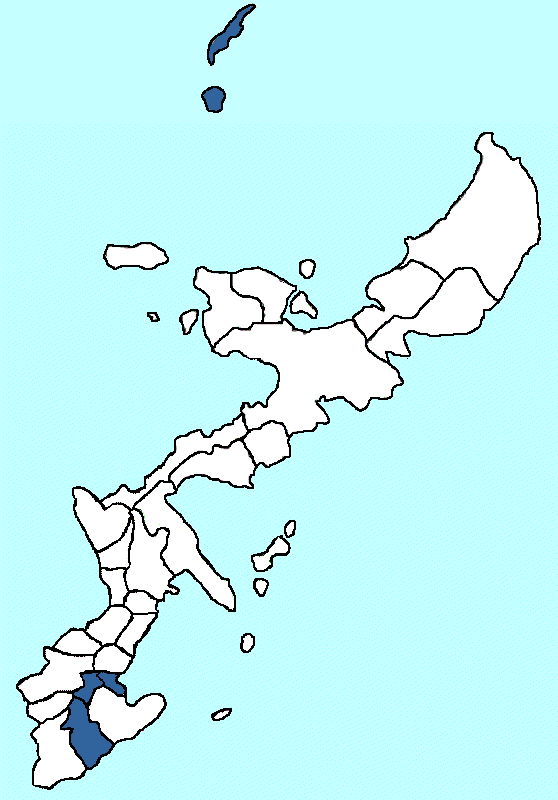
Shimajiri District in Okinawa Prefecture, not shown are Kume Island, the Kerama Islands, the Aguni Islands, and the Daitō Islands

Shimajiri (島尻郡, Shimajiri-gun; Okinawan: Shimajiri) is a district located in Okinawa Prefecture, Japan.

== Etymology ==
Modern translation of Shimajiri means "Butt of the island" which may refer to its southerly position on the island of Okinawa. Compare this to Kunigami District, Okinawa.

However, there are hundreds of geographic references throughout Japan and even into the northern Kuriles using "shiri", to approximate the Ainu word shir, meaning island. Despite Okinawa being so far south, historically Jōmon culture was dominant as on the mainland, and words likely have survived, though their original meanings have long been lost or modified.

== Population ==
As of 2020, the district has an estimated population of 105,230 and the density of 447.98 persons per km^{2}. The total area is 234.9 km^{2}.

== Geography ==
The district also includes Kume Island, the islands of Iheya and Izena, the Kerama Islands, the Aguni Islands, and the Daitō Islands.

== Towns and villages ==
- Haebaru Town
- Kumejima Town
- Yaese Town
- Yonabaru Town
- Aguni Village
- Iheya Village
- Izena Village
- Kitadaitō Village
- Minamidaitō Village
- Tokashiki Village
- Tonaki Village
- Zamami Village

== Mergers ==
- On April 1, 2002 the villages of Gushikawa and Nakazato merged to form the new town of Kumejima.
- On January 1, 2006 the town of Kochinda, and the village of Gushikami merged to form the new town of Yaese.
- On January 1, 2006 the town of Sashiki, and the villages of Chinen, Ōzato and Tamagusuku merged to form the new city of Nanjō.

== Transportation ==
The following airports are located in Shimajiri District and serve various islands:

- Aguni Airport (Aguni)
- Kerama Airport (Zamami)
- Minami-Daito Airport (Minamidaito)

Naha Airport in Naha serves Shimajiri District areas in or near Okinawa Island.
