= Utaki =

Sacred place in Ryukyuan religion

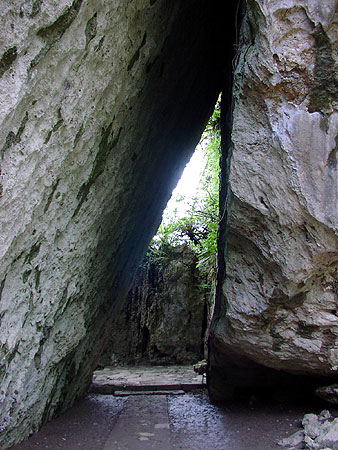
Sefa-utaki

Utaki (Okinawan: 御嶽) is an Okinawan term for a sacred place, often a grove, cave, or mountain. They are central to the Ryukyuan religion and the former noro priestess system. Although the term utaki is used throughout the Ryukyu Islands, the terms suku and on are heard in the Miyako and Yaeyama regions respectively. Utaki are usually located on the outskirts of villages and are places for the veneration of gods and ancestors. Most gusuku have places of worship, and it is theorized that the origins of both gusuku and utaki are closely related.

These places usually face east, due to the mythical origin of the gods and spirits in the East, or southeast, south, or southwest in a few places.

There are different theories about these places' origins. One reasonable explanation is that they were created by the indigenous people from the Jōmon period. Another, racialist theory was they were created from scratch by the Yamato people, which lead in the 1930s and 1940s to re-consecration and building new Shinto temples on the islands.

== Notable utaki ==
- Binnu Utaki (弁之御嶽), Naha
- Sefa-utaki (斎場御嶽), Nanjō
- Sunuhyan-utaki (園比屋武御嶽), Naha
