= Tamagusuku, Okinawa =

Village on Okinawa, Japan

Tamagusuku (玉城村, Tamagusuku-son; Okinawan:タマグシク, Tamagusiku / タモーシ, Tamoosi) was a village located in Shimajiri District, Okinawa Prefecture, Japan.

As of 2003, the village had an estimated population of 10,486 and a density of 621.58 persons per km^{2}. The total area was 16.87 km^{2}.

On January 1, 2006, Tamagusuku, along with the town of Sashiki, and the villages of Chinen and Ōzato (all from Shimajiri District), was merged to create the city of Nanjō.

In Tamagusuku, to the south-east of Naha, the Gyokusendō Cave with a total length of five kilometers is known for its beautiful stalagmites and stalactites. 850 metres of these caves are open to tourists.

== See also ==
- Tamagusuku Castle
