= Tokashiki, Okinawa =

Tokashiki 渡嘉敷村 Tōkashichi
- Village
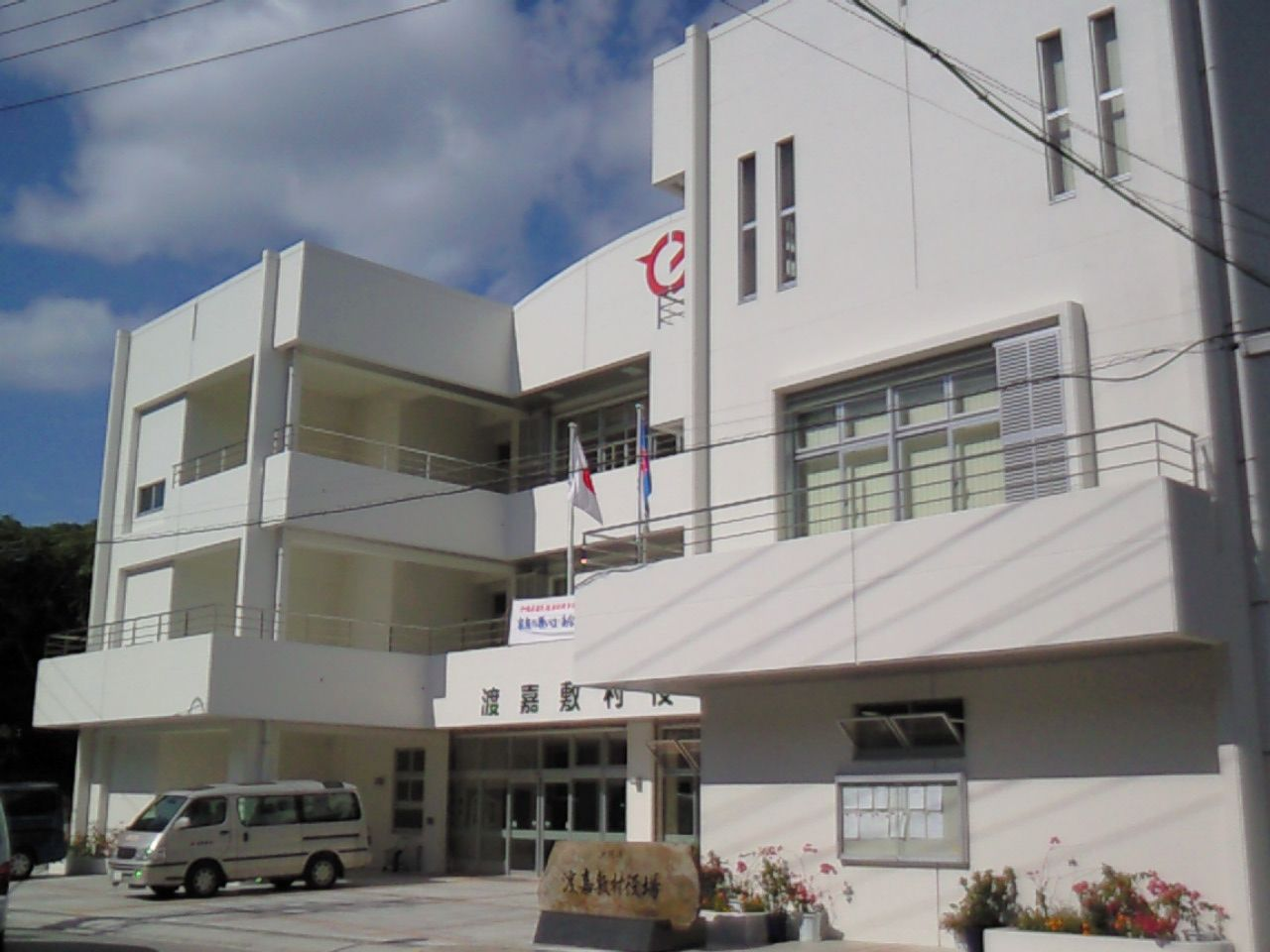
- Tokashiki Village Office

- Flag Seal

- Location of Tokashiki in Okinawa Prefecture

- Location in Japan
- Coordinates: 26°12′0″N 127°22′0″E
- Country: Japan
- Region: Kyushu
- Prefecture: Okinawa Prefecture
- District: Shimajiri

Government
  - Mayor: Masashige Zamami

Area
  - Total: 19.18 km^{2} (7.41 sq mi)

Population (October 1, 2020)
  - Total: 718
  - Density: 37.4/km^{2} (97.0/sq mi)
- Time zone: UTC+09:00 (JST)
- City hall address: 183 Tokashiki, Tokashiki-son, Shimajiri-gun, Okinawa; 901-3592
- Climate: Cfa
- Website: www.vill.tokashiki.okinawa.jp/en/index.htm/
- Symbols
- Fish: Skipjack tuna
- Flower: Kerama Azalea
- Tree: Chinese Fan Palm

Tokashiki (Japanese: 渡嘉敷村, Hepburn: Tokashiki-son; Okinawan: Tōkashichi) is a village located in the Kerama Islands in Okinawa Prefecture, Japan. The village is part of Shimajiri District. Tokashiki is known for its corals, sea, beach and sun. From Tomari Port in Naha, it takes less than one hour to reach this island.

On 28 March 1945, during World War II, 394 inhabitants, mostly from farmer families, were forced by Japanese soldiers to kill themselves, initially with grenades, after the landing of US troops.

== Geography ==
The island of Tokashiki consists of 10 islands of various sizes in the center of the Kerama Islands. The village is located approximately 30 kilometres (19 mi) west of Naha, the prefectural capital of Okinawa. These islands are rugged and mountainous.

=== Administrative divisions ===
The village includes three wards, with the Tokashiki ward being divided in two villages.

- Aharen (阿波連)
- Maejima (前島)
- Tokashiki (渡嘉敷)
  - Tokashiki (渡嘉敷)
  - Tokashiku (渡嘉志久)

=== Climate ===
Climate data for Tokashiki (1991−2020 normals, extremes 1977−present)
Month	Jan	Feb	Mar	Apr	May	Jun	Jul	Aug	Sep	Oct	Nov	Dec	Year
Record high °C (°F)	24.1 (75.4)	24.6 (76.3)	25.7 (78.3)	26.7 (80.1)	29.1 (84.4)	30.7 (87.3)	32.1 (89.8)	32.5 (90.5)	31.7 (89.1)	30.4 (86.7)	28.4 (83.1)	26.8 (80.2)	32.5 (90.5)
Mean daily maximum °C (°F)	17.8 (64.0)	18.1 (64.6)	19.7 (67.5)	22.0 (71.6)	24.6 (76.3)	27.5 (81.5)	29.3 (84.7)	29.3 (84.7)	28.3 (82.9)	25.8 (78.4)	22.8 (73.0)	19.5 (67.1)	23.7 (74.7)
Daily mean °C (°F)	15.6 (60.1)	15.7 (60.3)	17.2 (63.0)	19.5 (67.1)	22.2 (72.0)	25.1 (77.2)	26.9 (80.4)	26.8 (80.2)	25.8 (78.4)	23.5 (74.3)	20.7 (69.3)	17.4 (63.3)	21.4 (70.5)
Mean daily minimum °C (°F)	13.8 (56.8)	13.8 (56.8)	15.2 (59.4)	17.6 (63.7)	20.4 (68.7)	23.4 (74.1)	25.2 (77.4)	25.1 (77.2)	24.1 (75.4)	21.9 (71.4)	19.1 (66.4)	15.7 (60.3)	19.6 (67.3)
Record low °C (°F)	3.7 (38.7)	6.0 (42.8)	5.5 (41.9)	10.4 (50.7)	14.0 (57.2)	15.3 (59.5)	19.9 (67.8)	21.6 (70.9)	17.7 (63.9)	16.1 (61.0)	9.5 (49.1)	7.6 (45.7)	3.7 (38.7)
Average precipitation mm (inches)	134.2 (5.28)	129.2 (5.09)	170.3 (6.70)	194.9 (7.67)	269.1 (10.59)	284.8 (11.21)	154.7 (6.09)	208.8 (8.22)	234.6 (9.24)	157.4 (6.20)	120.9 (4.76)	135.8 (5.35)	2,200.5 (86.63)
Average precipitation days (≥ 1.0 mm)	12.1	11.3	13.0	11.8	12.4	11.7	8.4	11.0	11.7	8.6	9.1	10.9	132
Mean monthly sunshine hours	89.9	97.6	124.0	135.6	163.7	188.8	274.0	248.2	207.1	180.0	126.1	105.8	1,938.4
Source: Japan Meteorological Agency

== History ==
=== Early history ===
Prior to World War II Tokashiki produced charcoal for the city of Naha. Bonito fishing was also a mainstay of the population of the island, but as the bonito industry declined, the population of the village was reduced greatly.

=== World War II ===
The American forces landed on Tokashiki on March 27, 1945, as an early part of the Battle of Okinawa. On the following day, March 28, 1945, 394 inhabitants of Tokashiki, mostly from farming families, killed themselves after the landing of US troops, at the command of Japanese soldiers, in a practice that became known as shūdan jikketsu, or group suicide. Residents were taken to a cave and given grenades to kill themselves, resorting to beating each other with clubs and rocks once they ran out of grenades. The group suicide on Tokashiki in late March was a precursor to large-scale group suicides on Okinawa Island in the following months.

=== Maejima ===
The island Maejima once had a population of 380, but a string of powerful typhoons forced the inhabitants to eventually abandon their homes and leave the island, with the last 4 families leaving in February 1962. From then on the island was uninhabited for 42 years until in 2003 a former resident moved back to the island together with his family. They left in 2024 and the island once again became uninhabited.

== Transportation ==
Tokashiki port is connected to Naha by ferry. But the small Mitshushima ferry also connect the Aharen port to Zamami and Aka.

== Economy ==
=== Agriculture ===
Tokashiki is home to small-scale farming. A small amount of vegetables are produced in the village.

=== Tourism ===
The village of Tokashiki is part of Okinawa Kaigan Quasi-National Park and is blessed with a remarkable number of spots of scenic beauty. Due to this, the village has promoted tourism as a primary industry since the reversion of Okinawa Prefecture to Japan in 1972. Numerous tourist facilities such as hotels, esplanades, and viewing towers have been built across Tokashiki Island.

== Noted places ==
- Shinrin Park. The park is accessible from the Aharen district only by foot, and consist of a wide grassy area and a large wooden playground for children. Shinrin Park is quiet as it has relatively few visitors.

== Cultural and natural assets ==
Tokashiki Village hosts twelve tangible cultural properties and monuments, only two of which are designated at the municipal level.

- Name (Japanese) (Type of registration)

=== Cultural Properties ===
- Aharen'ura Shell Mound (阿波連浦貝塚)
- Funakoshibaru Site (船越原遺跡)
- Katsuobushi Factory Site (鰹節製造工場跡)
- Kubandaki Praying Site (クバンダキ)
- Kuba-yama (fan palm tree mountain) of Aharen (阿波連のクバ山)
- Kumi-chijiyama Sacred Site (クミチジ山 (久米頂山))
- Mīya Dunchi-gwā Shrine (海神宮)
- Nemoto Residence Stone Wall (根元家の石垣) (Municipal)
- Nishi Utaki Sacred Site (北ウタキ)
- Strength stone of Aharen (in the garden of the community centre) (阿波連の力石 (生活館中庭))
- Tomb of the God-of-Learning (学問の世の神様の墓)

=== Places of scenic beauty ===
- View of the Kerama Straits from Mount Nishi (にし山(北山)山頂から望む慶良間海峡) (Municipal)
