= Ōzato, Okinawa =

Dissolved municipality in Okinawa prefecture, Japan

Ōzato (大里村, Ōzato-son; Okinawan:ウフジャトゥ,Uhuzatu) was a village located in Shimajiri District, Okinawa Prefecture, Japan. Ōzato Castle is located here. It is named after Nanzan's the royal family.

In 2003, the village had an estimated population of 11,648 and a density of 943.16 persons per km^{2}. The total area was 12.35 km^{2}.

On January 1, 2006, Ōzato, along with the town of Sashiki, and the villages of Chinen and Tamagusuku (all from Shimajiri District), was merged to create the city of Nanjō.
