= Administrative divisions of the Ryukyu Kingdom =

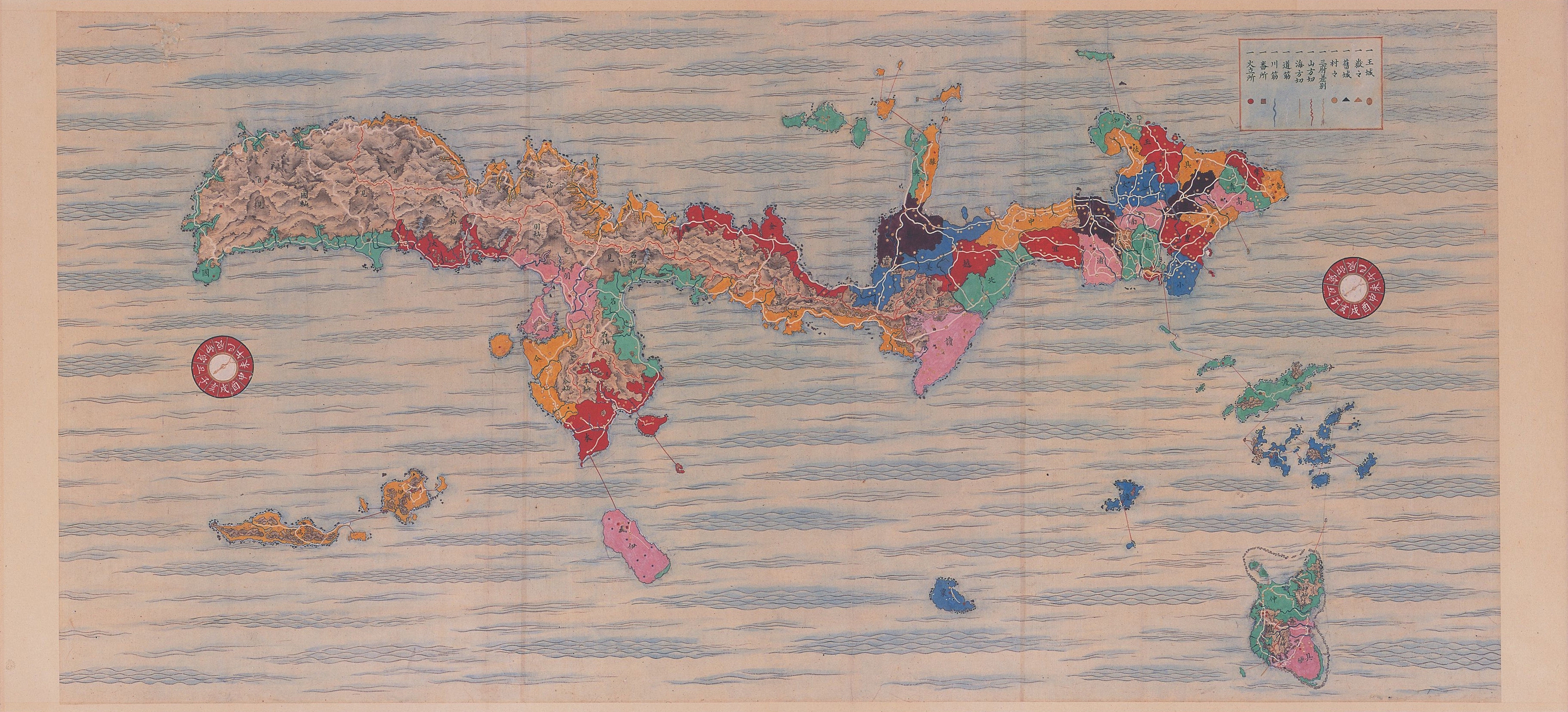
Map of the administrative divisions in the Okinawa Islands from the 18th century. 305 centimetres (120 in) (East–West) by 548 centimetres (216 in) (North–South). (Okinawa Prefectural Library) (Note: Mountains, rivers, roads, etc. are depicted at a scale of 6 sun (寸, Cun (unit)) (1.193 inch) to one Li) (2.440 miles), at the scale of approximately 1:21,600. Legend: * Black circles: (mileposts (一里塚, ichirizuka)), drawn on either side of the highway. * The oval frames: color-coded by county, and the village names and rice yields are written inside. * White squares: castle towns, with the place names and the names of the castle lords are written inside. (Note: The National Archives of Japan has eight of the original Genroku Maps and eight copies in storage (omitted), along with 83 sheets of the Tempō Kuni Ezu Maps for the whole country (119 if duplicates are included); those 85 volumes of the Tempō Registry (Tempo Gocho, Tempō Gōchō), or the Registry of the Residents recorded the rice yield (石高, kokudaka) of each village in each province, from Matsumae Island to the Ryukyu Islands.)

The administrative divisions of the Ryukyu Kingdom were a hierarchy composed of districts – magiri or majiri (Okinawan) – cities, villages, and islands established by the Ryukyu Kingdom throughout the Ryukyu Islands.

== Divisions ==
There were three districts (方) or hō: Kunigami (国頭), Nakagami (中頭), and Shimajiri (島尻), which roughly correspond to the borders of the three Okinawan kingdoms during the Sanzan period. There were 57 magiri (間切; Okinawan: majiri) throughout the kingdom including the Amami Islands. In concept they were similar to present-day Japanese prefectures, but in size they were closer to Japanese cities, towns and villages. There were four cities: Shuri (首里), Naha (那覇), Tomari (泊), and Kume (久米). They were comparable to Japanese urban prefectures. There were over 600 villages (村; Okinawan: mura) throughout the kingdom including the Amami Islands. (Note: As there is no topographical maps from the Sanzan period discovered, the division of the area is based on archaeological and historical considerations.。) There were approximately 24 shima (島) or "outlying islands", but only including islands that weren't already part of a magiri.

== History ==
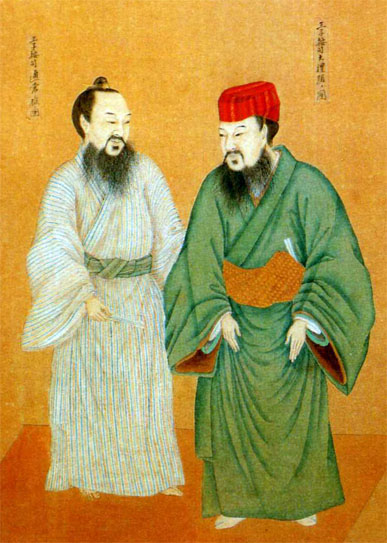
Dress of Oji and Aji.

The three districts are based on the three kingdoms of Hokuzan, Chūzan, and Nanzan. The origin of the magiri system is unclear, but was solidified by the beginning of the reign of Shō Shin, the third king of the Second Shō Dynasty of the Ryukyu Kingdom who ruled between 1477 and 1526. The magiri were originally controlled by individual aji and oyakata, whose ruling area overwrapped in parts. While as the Ryukyu Kingdom centralized at the turn of the 15th century, the aji relocated to the capital of the kingdom at Shuri. After this period the title of aji became symbolic, and low-ranking officials were assigned the day-to-day administration of the magiri.

Each magiri had several villages, sometimes referred to as shima, which represented an administrative unit similar to the mura, or village, in feudal Japan. Each magiri had five to ten villages. Ryukyuan commoners were registered to a particular village, and movement to or from the administrative areas was generally not permitted. Under the system of Shō Shin the central government at Shuri assigned each village a noro priestess to carry out the religious functions of the settlement. The area was mapped on the Ryukyu kuni-ezu (琉球國絵図 of 1696 or 9th year of Genroku) (Note: There are three Ryukyu Kingdom maps for Oshima Island (312 by 597 centimetres or 123 by 235 inches), Yaeyama Island (261 centimetres (103 in) by 589 centimetres (232 in)), and Okinawa Island (305 centimetres (120 in) by 584 centimetres (230 in)).) was compiled. That made it possible for the first time, to clarify the geopolitical location of ancient place names.

The magiri system continued to varying degrees in the Amami Islands even after they were ceded to Satsuma Domain in 1624. On Okinawa Island, there were 27 magiri at the turn of the 17th century, but by the 19th century Misato, Kushi, Motobu, Ginowan, Oroku, Onna, Ōgimi, and Yonagusuku were created, bringing the total to 35. The magiri system continued after the end of the Ryukyu Kingdom and annexation of the islands by Japan in 1879. In 1907, under Imperial Edict 46, the Japanese administrative system of cities, towns, and village organization was extended to Okinawa. The magiri system was officially abolished on April 1, 1908.

== List of magiri ==
The following is a list of magiri by district:

=== Kunigami District ===
Kunigami District (国頭方, Kunigami-hō; Okinawan: Kunjan-hō), also known as Okinawan: 山原, romanized: Yanbaru and Kunigami or Hokuzan-fu (北山府) in Kanbun, roughly correspond to the territory of Hokuzan during the Sanzan period.

Area	Name	Kanji	Okinawan name	present-day	notes
Northern area of Okinawa Main Island and nearby islands	Kunigami	国頭間切	Kunjan	Kunigami	
Northern area of Okinawa Main Island and nearby islands	Ōgimi	大宜味間切	Wujimi	Ōgimi	established in 1673; changed name from Taminato (田港) in 1695
Northern area of Okinawa Main Island and nearby islands	Iheya	伊平屋間切	Ihya	Iheya, Izena	
Northern area of Okinawa Main Island and nearby islands	Haneji	羽地間切	Haniji	Nago (Haneji area, Yagaji area)	
Northern area of Okinawa Main Island and nearby islands	Nakijin	今帰仁間切	Nachijin	Nakijin	
Northern area of Okinawa Main Island and nearby islands	Motobu	本部間切	Mutubu	Motobu	established in 1666; changed name from Inoha (伊野波) in 1667
Northern area of Okinawa Main Island and nearby islands	Nago	名護間切	Nagu	Nago, excluding Haneji and Yagaji areas	
Northern area of Okinawa Main Island and nearby islands	Kushi	久志間切	Kushi	Higashi and part of Nago	established in 1673
Northern area of Okinawa Main Island and nearby islands	Kin	金武間切	Chin	Kin, Ginoza	
Southern Amami Islands	Erabu	永良部間切	Irabu	China, Wadomari, (Kagoshima Prefecture	de facto incorporated into Satsuma Domain (Ōsumi Province) since 1624; de jure remained a part of Ryukyu Kingdom
Southern Amami Islands	Yoron	与論間切	Yunnu	Yoron	de facto incorporated into Satsuma Domain (Ōsumi Province) since 1624; de jure remained a part of Ryukyu Kingdom

=== Nakagami District ===
Nakagami District (中頭方, Nakagami-hō; also known as Okinawan: 上方, romanized: Wiikata) or Chūzan-fu (中山府) in Kanbun, roughly correspond to the territory of Chūzan during the Sanzan period.

Area	Name	Kanji	Okinawan name	present-day	notes
Central area of Okinawa Main Island and nearby islands	Onna	恩納間切	Unna	Onna	established in 1673
Central area of Okinawa Main Island and nearby islands	Yomitanzan	読谷山間切	Yuntanja	Yomitan	
Central area of Okinawa Main Island and nearby islands	Goeku	越来間切	Gwiiku	Okinawa City	
Central area of Okinawa Main Island and nearby islands	Misato	美里間切	Njatu	Okinawa City, Uruma (Ishikawa Area)	established in 1666
Central area of Okinawa Main Island and nearby islands	Gushikawa	具志川間切	Gushichaa	Uruma (Gushikawa area)	
Central area of Okinawa Main Island and nearby islands	Katsuren	勝連間切	Kacchan	Uruma (Katsuren area)	
Central area of Okinawa Main Island and nearby islands	Yonashiro	与那城間切	Yunagushiku	Uruma (Yonashiro area)	established with the name Nishihara (西原) in 1676; changed name to Hirata (平田) in the same year; finally changed to Yonashiro in 1687.
Central area of Okinawa Main Island and nearby islands	Nishihara	西原間切	Nishibaru	Nishihara	
Central area of Okinawa Main Island and nearby islands	Chatan	北谷間切	Chatan	Chatan, Kadena, part of Okinawa City	
Central area of Okinawa Main Island and nearby islands	Nakagusuku	中城間切	Nakagushiku	present Nakagusuku, Kita-Nakagusuku, Uruma (Tsuken Island)	
Central area of Okinawa Main Island and nearby islands	Ginowan	宜野湾間切	Jinōn	present-day Ginowan	established in 1671
Central area of Okinawa Main Island and nearby islands	Urasoe	浦添間切	Urashii	Urasoe	
Central area of Okinawa Main Island and nearby islands	Nakazato	仲里間切	Nakajatu	Kumejima (Nakazato area)	
Central area of Okinawa Main Island and nearby islands	Uezu	上江洲間切	Wiiji	Kumejima (Gushikawa area)	
Four cities (not included in magiri)	Tomari	泊	Tumai	Naha (northern area of Naha)	
Four cities (not included in magiri)	Naha	那覇	Nafa, Nafaa	Naha (southern area of Naha), Tokashiki, Zamami	contains 4 towns (町, machi): Wakasa-machi (若狭町; Okinawan: Wakasa-machi), Higashi-machi (東町; Okinawan: Figashi-machi), Nishi-machi (西町; Okinawan: Nishi-machi) and Izumizaki (泉崎; Okinawan: Ijunjachi)
Four cities (not included in magiri)	Kume	久米	Kuninda	Naha (Kume area)	community of Thirty-six families from Min. full name: Kumemura (久米村); Chinese name: Táng íng (唐營) before 1650; Táng róng (唐榮) since 1650
Four cities (not included in magiri)	Shuri Mihira	首里三平等	Sui Mifira	Naha (Shuri area, Mawashi area), Nishihara, Haebaru)	contains Shuri Castle and 3 hira (平等; Okinawan: fira): Mawashi no hira (真和志之平等; Okinawan: Maaji nu fira), Hae no hira (南風之平等; Okinawan: Fee nu fira) and Nishi no hira (西之平等; Okinawan: Nishi nu fira)

=== Shimajiri District ===
Shimajiri District (島尻方, Shimajiri-hō; also known as Okinawan: 下方, romanized: Shimukata) or Nanzan-fu (南山府) in Kanbun, roughly correspond to the territory of Nanzan during the Sanzan period.

Area	Name	Kanji	Okinawan name	present-day	notes
Southern area of Okinawa Main Island and nearby islands	Tomigusuku	豊見城間切	Tumigushiku	Tomigusuku	
Southern area of Okinawa Main Island and nearby islands	Oroku	小禄間切	Uruku	Naha (Oroku area)	established in 1672
Southern area of Okinawa Main Island and nearby islands	Takamine	高嶺間切	Takanmi	Itoman (excluding Kyan and Mabuni areas)	changed name from Shimajiriōzato (島尻大里) in 1667
Southern area of Okinawa Main Island and nearby islands	Kyan	喜屋武間切	Chan	Itoman (Kyan area)	
Southern area of Okinawa Main Island and nearby islands	Mabuni	摩文仁間切	Mabuni	Itoman (Mabuni area)	
Southern area of Okinawa Main Island and nearby islands	Makabe	真壁間切	Makabi	Itoman (Makabe area)	
Southern area of Okinawa Main Island and nearby islands	Kanegusuku	兼城間切	Kanigushiku	Itoman (Kanegusuku area)	also known as Okinawan: 島尻兼城, romanized: Shimajirikanegusuku
Southern area of Okinawa Main Island and nearby islands	Kochinda	東風平間切	Kuchinda	Yaese (Kochinda area)	
Southern area of Okinawa Main Island and nearby islands	Gushichan	具志頭間切	Gushichan	Yaese (Gushichan area)	
Southern area of Okinawa Main Island and nearby islands	Ōzato	大里間切	Ufuzatu	Nanjō (Ōzato area), Yonabaru)	changed name from Shimazoeōzato (島添大里) in 1667
Southern area of Okinawa Main Island and nearby islands	Sashiki	佐敷間切	Sashichi	Nanjō (Sashiki area, Chinen area)	
Southern area of Okinawa Main Island and nearby islands	Tamagusuku	玉城間切	Tamagushiku	Nanjō (Tamagusuku area)	

=== Sakishima Islands ===
Area	Name	Kanji	Okinawan name	present-day	notes
Miyako Islands	Hirara	平良間切	Teera	Miyakojima (Hirara area)	
Miyako Islands	Shimoji	下地間切	Shimuji	Miyakojima (Shimoji area, Ueno area)	
Miyako Islands	Sunakawa	砂川間切	Shinachaa	Miyakojima (Gusukube area)	
Yaeyama Islands	Ōhama	大浜間切	Ufuhama	Ishigaki	
Yaeyama Islands	Miyara	宮良間切	Myaara	Ishigaki	
Yaeyama Islands	Ishigaki	石垣間切	Ishigachi	Ishigaki	

=== Northern Amami Islands ===
Area	Name	Kanji	Okinawan name	present-day	notes
Amami Ōshima	Kasari	笠利間切		Amami (Kasari area)	de facto incorporated into Satsuma Domain (Ōsumi Province) since 1624; de jure remained a part of Ryukyu Kingdom
Amami Ōshima	Komi	古見間切		Tatsugō, Amami	de facto incorporated into Satsuma Domain (Ōsumi Province) since 1624; de jure remained a part of Ryukyu Kingdom
Amami Ōshima	Naze	名瀬間切		Yamato, Amami	de facto incorporated into Satsuma Domain (Ōsumi Province) since 1624; de jure remained a part of Ryukyu Kingdom
Amami Ōshima	Yakiuchi	焼内間切		Yamato, Uken	de facto incorporated into Satsuma Domain (Ōsumi Province) since 1624; de jure remained a part of Ryukyu Kingdom
Amami Ōshima	Sumiyō	住用間切		Amami (Sumiyō area)	de facto incorporated into Satsuma Domain (Ōsumi Province) since 1624; de jure remained a part of Ryukyu Kingdom
Amami Ōshima	Nishikata	西方間切		Setouchi	de facto incorporated into Satsuma Domain (Ōsumi Province) since 1624; de jure remained a part of Ryukyu Kingdom
Amami Ōshima	Higashikata	東方間切		Setouchi	de facto incorporated into Satsuma Domain (Ōsumi Province) since 1624; de jure remained a part of Ryukyu Kingdom
Kikaijima	Shidooke	志戸桶間切		Kikai (Shidooke area)	de facto incorporated into Satsuma Domain (Ōsumi Province) since 1624; de jure remained a part of Ryukyu Kingdom
Kikaijima	Higa	東間切		Kikai (Sōmachi area)	de facto incorporated into Satsuma Domain (Ōsumi Province) since 1624; de jure remained a part of Ryukyu Kingdom
Kikaijima	Isago	伊砂間切		Kikai (Isago area)	de facto incorporated into Satsuma Domain (Ōsumi Province) since 1624; de jure remained a part of Ryukyu Kingdom established in 1693
Kikaijima	Nishime	西目間切		Kikai (Nishime area)	de facto incorporated into Satsuma Domain (Ōsumi Province) since 1624; de jure remained a part of Ryukyu Kingdom
Kikaijima	Wan	湾間切		Kikai (Wan area)	de facto incorporated into Satsuma Domain (Ōsumi Province) since 1624; de jure remained a part of Ryukyu Kingdom
Kikaijima	Araki	荒木間切		Kikai (Araki area)	de facto incorporated into Satsuma Domain (Ōsumi Province) since 1624; de jure remained a part of Ryukyu Kingdom
Tokunoshima	Higashi	東間切		Tokunoshima	de facto incorporated into Satsuma Domain (Ōsumi Province) since 1624; de jure remained a part of Ryukyu Kingdom
Tokunoshima	Omonawa	面縄間切	Unnō	Isen	de facto incorporated into Satsuma Domain (Ōsumi Province) since 1624; de jure remained a part of Ryukyu Kingdom
Tokunoshima	Nishime	西目間切		Amagi	de facto incorporated into Satsuma Domain (Ōsumi Province) since 1624; de jure remained a part of Ryukyu Kingdom

== See also ==
- Prefectures of Japan
