= Kudaka Island =

Island in Okinawa Prefecture, Japan

- GSI aerial photograph of Kudaka Island in 2005
- Interactive map of Kudaka Island

Geography
- Coordinates: 26°09′28″N 127°53′12″E
- Archipelago: Ryukyu Islands; Okinawa Islands

Administration
- Japan
- Prefecture: Okinawa
- City: Nanjō

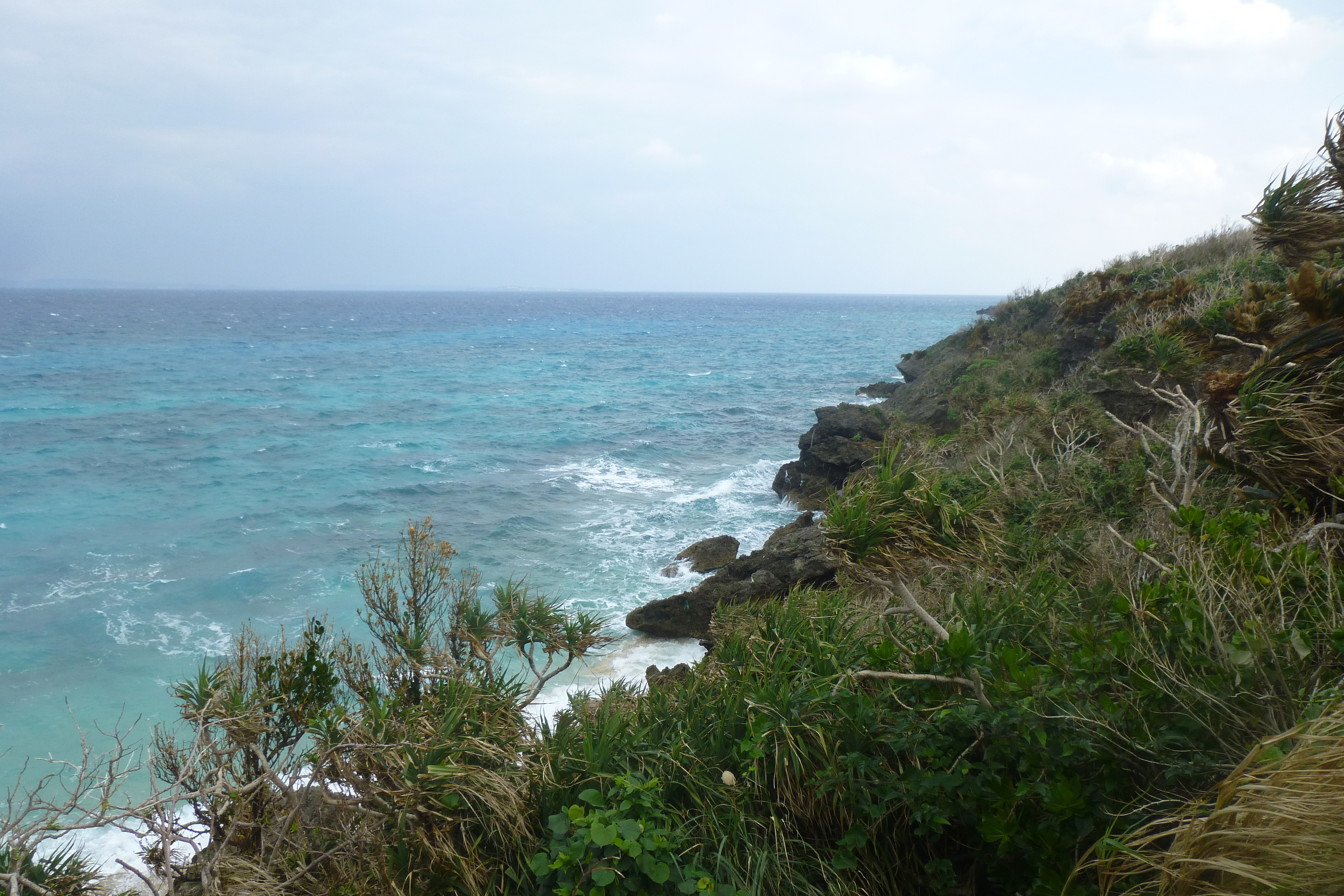
Coast of Kudaka Island

Kudaka Island (Japanese: 久高島, くだかじま; Okinawan: Kudaka-shima) is an island in Ryukyu Islands, located in Nanjō, Okinawa Prefecture, Japan and 5.3 kilometers away from Cape Chinen, Nanjō. From Nanjō, Kudaka Island can be reached by high-speed boat in 15 minutes and by ferry in 20 minutes. It is only about three miles off the southeast coast of Okinawa.

Kudaka Island is a slender island running from the northeast to the southwest, with an area of 1.38 square kilometers and a coastline of 7.8 kilometers. The terrain is flat and the highest point is 17.4 meters. The soil of Kudaka Island is terracotta, with poor water retention. In addition, coral reefs are constantly being formed along the coast, resulting in lagoons.

According to the Chūzan Seikan, the Emperor of Heaven ordered Amamikyu, the Ryukyuan creation goddess, to descend on Kudaka Island. Therefore, Kudaka Island is worshipped as a holy place by the Ryukyuan people.
