= Sefa-utaki =

Sacred space in Kudaka, Okinawa

Sefa-utaki 斎場御嶽
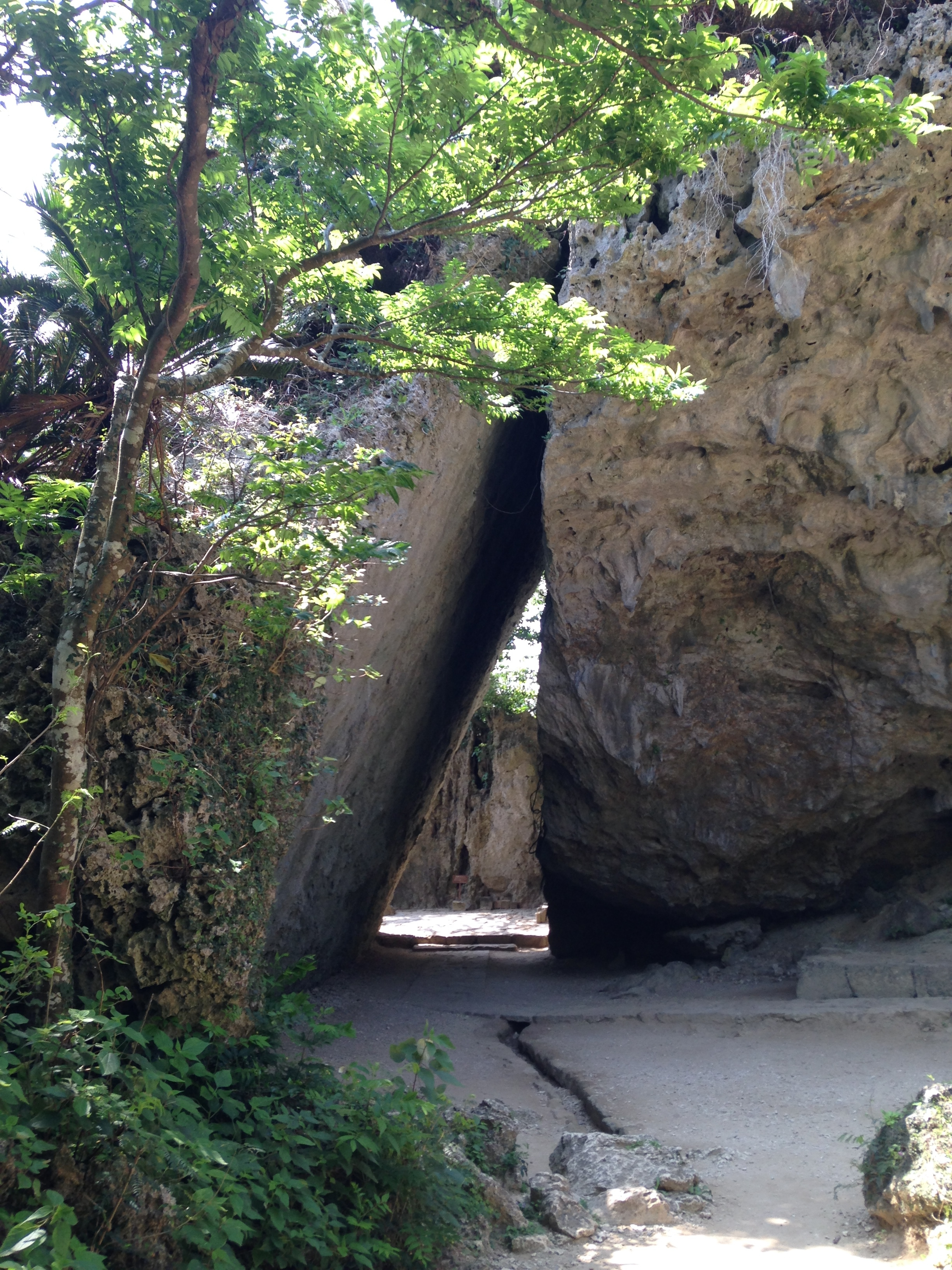
- Sangui (Triangle Rock) of Sefa-Utaki

- Sefa-utaki Sefa-utaki (Japan)

Religion
- Affiliation: Ryukyuan religion

Location
- Location: 4-chome, Shuri Toribori-cho, Naha-shi, Okinawa-ken
- Interactive map of Sefa-utaki 斎場御嶽
- Coordinates: 26°10′24″N 127°49′36″E

Website
- Official website

UNESCO World Heritage Site
- Criteria: Cultural: ii, iii, vi
- Reference: 972
- Inscription: 2000 (24th Session)

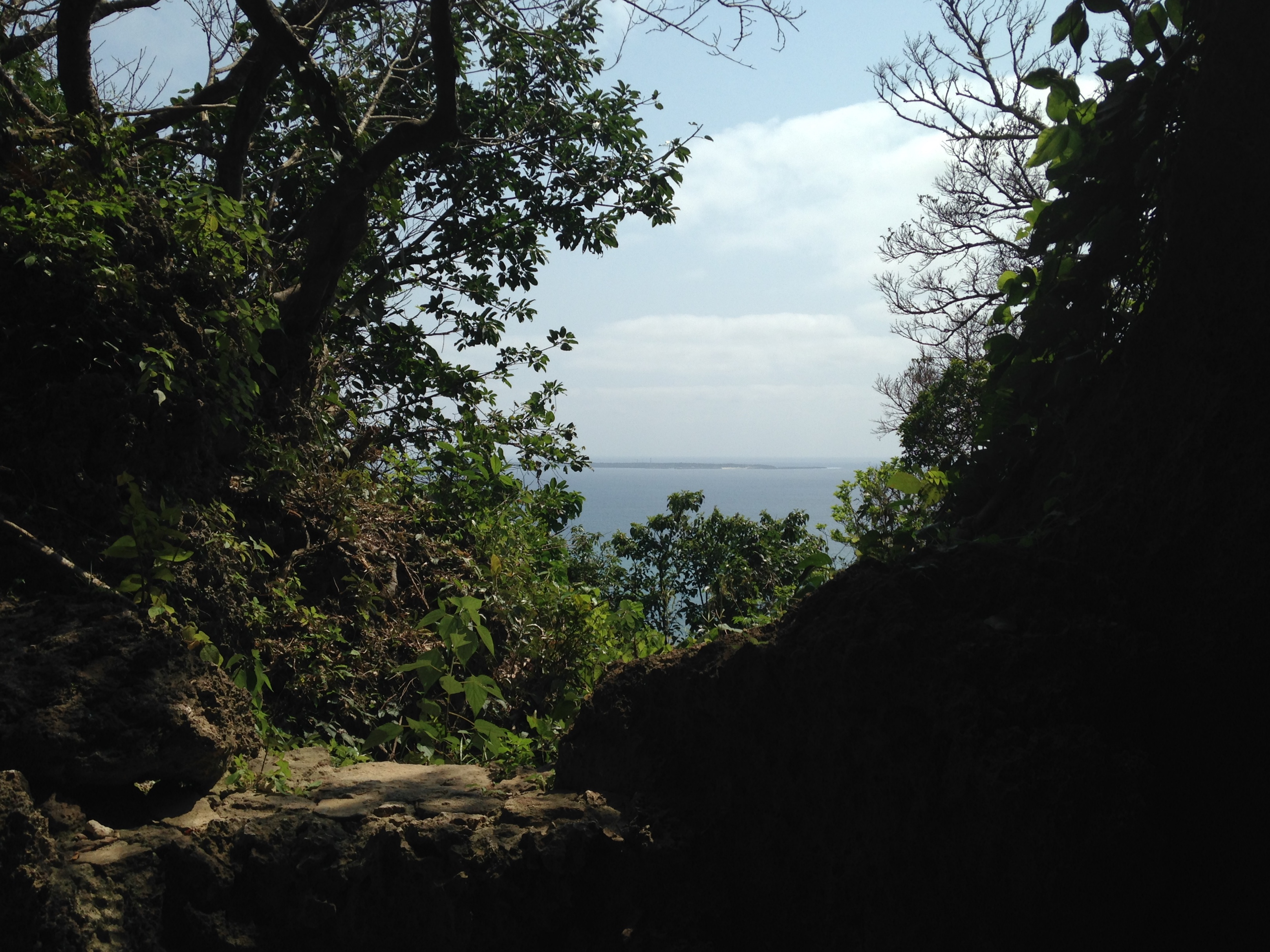
View of Kudaka Island from Sefa-utaki

Sefa-utaki (Okinawan: 斎場御嶽, セーファウタキ, romanized: Sēfa-utaki), is a historical sacred space, overlooking Kudaka Island, that served as one of the key locations of worship in the native religion of Ryukyuan for millennia. It was designated a National Historic Site in 2018. It is part of the UNESCO World Heritage Site Gusuku Sites and Related Properties of the Kingdom of Ryukyu in the city of Nanjō, Okinawa, Japan.

== Overview ==
Sefa-utaki is on the Chinen Peninsula, and has been recognized as a sacred place since the earliest period of Ryukyuan history. According to the Chūzan Seikan, this was the spot where Amamikyu, goddess of creation, made landfall on Okinawa. The shrine area itself comprises a number of caves and overhanging ledges opening to the east and south among towering rock formations of a high promontory over the sea. All buildings have been destroyed, but the outer and inner precincts can still be traced.

It is believed to have been constructed from the 15th to 16th century during the reign of King Shō Shin of the Second Shō Dynasty of the Ryūkyū Kingdom. "Sēfa" means "highest rank," and "Sēfa-utaki" means "the greatest utaki," The grounds contain several places of worship with the same names as the facilities within Shuri Castle. In Sangui, the innermost area where three places of worship are concentrated, is the most prestigious place. From Sangui, it is possible to offer remote worship to Kudaka Island, considered the most sacred site associated with the founding of the kingdom, but this is not mentioned in historical records. This is due to the collapse of a corner of Sangui's rock walls in the early modern period; Sangui was originally an open space surrounded by rock walls on three sides. Since the interior of Sangui is now off-limits, the Kudaka Island worship site is also currently closed to the public.

During the Ryūkyū Kingdom, this was the kingdom's most sacred spot and was managed by Kikoe-ōgimi (Okinawan: 聞得大君, チフィウフジン, romanized: Chifi-ufujin), the highest priest of the state. In the past, all utaki in the Ryūkyū Kingdom were off-limits to men, and at Sefa-utaki, commoners were not permitted to enter beyond the Ujoguchi entrance. Even the king had to change his sleeves to conform to women's clothing in order to enter beyond the Ujoguchi entrance. Later as a part of assimilation of Okinawa by Japan, it was shifted to serve as a Shinto shrine.

Celadon from Longquan kiln in China, and gold, jade, and glass magatama beads and ancient coins excavated within the site have been collectively designated as Important Cultural Properties (archaeological materials) under the title "Okinawa Prefecture Sefa Utaki Excavated Artifacts."

== See also ==
- List of Historic Sites of Japan (Okinawa)
