= King of Sanhoku =

- 山北王

Details
- First monarch: unknown (traditional narrative)
- Last monarch: Han'anchi (traditional narrative)
- Formed: Sometime between 1314 and 1320 (traditional date)
- Abolished: 1416 (traditional date)
- Residence: Nakijin Castle (traditional narrative)

King of Sanhoku (山北王, Sanhoku-ō) was a title given to a line of local rulers on Okinawa Island from the late 14th century to the early 15th century. Contemporary sources on the Kings of Sanhoku are extremely scarce, and narratives on them have gradually been expanded over time. In historiography, the term Sanhoku conveniently refers to a realm supposedly under their control. Sanhoku is also known as Hokuzan (北山). The new term was coined in the 18th century by Sai On by flipping the two-character title.

== Contemporary sources ==
Contemporary Chinese sources claim that there were three "kings" in the State of Ryūkyū (i.e., Okinawa Island): the King of Chūzan, the King of Sannan, and the King of Sanhoku. The King of Sanhoku was least mentioned and is surrounded by mystery.

In 1372, Satto, a ruler on Okinawa Island, greeted a Chinese envoy from the newly-established Ming Dynasty and was later given the title of King of Chūzan. He was followed by the King of Sannan in 1380. In 1382, another Chinese envoy visited Okinawa and returned to China in the next year. According to an article of 1383 in the Chinese Veritable Records of the Ming, the envoy learned that there were three "kings" who were at war with each other. Accordingly, the Ming emperor issued an edict to the King of Sannan and the King of Sanhoku to end the conflict. In response, Hanishi, King of Sanhoku, sent a tributary mission to China for the first time in 1383.

Thereafter, the Kings of Sanhoku were only known by tributary missions sent under their names:

- Hanishi (怕尼芝): 1383, 1384, 1385, 1388, and 1390.
- Min (珉): 1395.
- Han'anchi (攀安知): 1396, 1396, 1397, 1397, 1398, 1403, 1404, 1405, 1405, 1406, and 1415.

After 1415, the King of Sanhoku lost contact with China. The Chinese records suggest that the Chinese had no information on when and how the king disappeared. Because the King of Chūzan continued tributary missions, the Chinese later speculated that the Kings of Sannan and Sanhoku had been removed by the King of Chūzan.

The number of tributary missions sent under the name of the King of Sanhoku was much smaller than those of the King of Chūzan and the King of Sannan. The Kings of Chūzan and Sannan were given ocean-going vessels by the Ming emperor while the King of Sanhoku had no such record. Historian Dana Masayuki notes that the tributary missions under the name of the King of Sanhoku arrived at China nearly simultaneously with those under the name of the King of Chūzan, suggesting that the two groups coordinated with each other. Just like the Kings of Chūzan and Sannan, the King of Sanhoku sent horses and sulfur to China. Sulfur was only mined on Iōtorishima, located further north of Okinawa Island. The reason why all the three kings, who were supposedly at war, had access to sulfur remains a mystery.

Modern historians generally consider that it was overseas Chinese merchants who needed non-Chinese rulers, under whose names they joined authorized sea trade under the guise of tributary missions because Ming China exercised tight control over sea trade. Historian Ikuta Shigeru even speculated that the conflict between the three kings was a cover story created by Chinese merchants to increase the number of name-lenders.

The three rulers, Hanishi, Min, and Han'anchi, assumed the title of King of Sanhoku. The Chinese did not record their blood relationship. Although the name "Sanhoku" (north of the mountain (island)) indicates that they had a stronghold in the northern part of the island, the exact location was never recorded. Modern historians generally treat Hanishi as a corrupt form of Haneji, a place name of northern Okinawa. It is possible that Han'anchi was also named after the place.

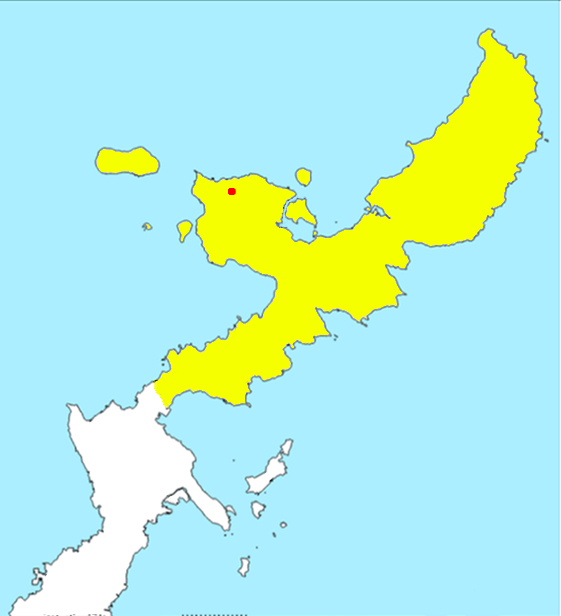
An approximate realm of the King of Sanhoku according to the Chūzan Seikan, with the capital Nakijin indicated by a red circle.

== Later Okinawan narratives ==
Haneji Chōshū's Chūzan Seikan (1650), the first official history book of the Ryūkyū Kingdom, recorded the Okinawan perception of the day, with a limited contamination of Chinese records. According to the Chūzan Seikan, Okinawa was split into three during the reign of King Tamagusuku (traditional dates: 1314–1337) and was later "re-unified" by King Shō Hashi in 1422. Modern historians question this narrative, favoring a progressive view of history, in which numerous chiefdoms were gradually unified into a kingdom.

The Chūzan Seikan identified the King of Sanhou as Aji (local ruler) of Nakijin, who supposedly subjected to his rule Haneji, Nago, Kunigami, Kin, Ie and Iheya. These place names as a whole roughly correspond to modern-day Kunigami region. The notion of three powers appears to be deeply rooted in Okinawan society. However, it remains a matter of debate whether they corresponded to the later administrative divisions of Shimajiri (south), Nakagami (central), and Kunigami (north). Historian Ikemiya Masaharu pointed to the religiously oriented division of Okinawa, in which three powers were based on Eastern Shimajiri, Western Shimajiri, and Nakagami. Kunigami was divided by the three powers.

The Chūzan Seikan did not mention how many rulers had assumed the title of Aji of Nakijin, or King of Sanhoku. The sole reference to personal names was of Hanishi, King of Sanhoku, who the Chūzan Seikan stated had sent a tributary mission along with the Kings of Chūzan and Sannan in 1372. Although this statement contradicts contemporary Chinese sources, it was apparently based on Haneji Chōshū's limited access to diplomatic records.

The Chūzan Seikan recorded a dramatic story about the downfall of the unnamed King of Sanhoku. Shō Hashi, King of Sannan, subjugated Bunei, King of Chūzan, and took over the position in 1421. By that time, a large portion of the former realm of the King of Sanhoku had surrendered to Shō Hashi. The King of Sanhoku was a fierce warrior and prepared for the final battle with the King of Chūzan. Being informed of Sanhoku's possible offensive by the Aji of Haneji, Shō Hashi dispatched the Aji of Urasoe, the Aji of Goeku, and the Aji of Yuntanza to destroy the King of Sanhoku in 1422. Following a fierce defense, the king's castle fell. The king and his closest vassals committed suicide.

Ethnologist Ōbayashi Taryō argued that the story of the downfall of the King of Sanhoku was part of Ryūkyū's tripartite ideology. According to his hypothesis, Sanhoku, Chūzan, and Sannan were mapped to military, sovereignty, and productivity, respectively. The King of Sanhoku was associated with extraordinary military prowess. The King of Sanhoku's sacred Japanese sword (blade) named Chiyoganemaru can be regarded as part of the regalia.

The Chūzan Seikan stated that King Shō Hashi appointed his son Shō Chū as Nakijin Ōji in 1422. He succeeded to the throne in 1440. Although the Chūzan Seikan identified the King of Sanhoku as Aji of Nakijin, it did not explicitly state that Nakijin Ōji had ruled the former realm of the King of Sanhoku.

Sai Taku's edition of the Chūzan Seifu (1701) generally followed the Chūzan Seikan, but Sai On's edition of the Chūzan Seifu (1725) drastically changed the statements. Having access to Chinese diplomatic records, he added the records of tributary missions sent under the name of the King of Sanhoku. The last king was now identified as Han'anchi. More importantly, he changed the date of the King of Sanhoku's downfall from 1422 to 1416. Sai On naïvely inferred that the King of Sanhoku was removed immediately after the last tributary mission of 1415. This modification created an unnatural gap between the downfall of the King of Sanhoku (1416) and the appointment of Shō Chū as Nakijin Ōji (1422).

== See also ==
- Sanzan period
- Genealogy of the Kings of Chūzan
