= History of the Ryukyu Islands =

Coordinates: 24°26′N 122°59′E

This article is about the history of the Ryukyu Islands. The Ryukyu Islands stretch from Kyushu to Taiwan and historically served as an important maritime crossroads linking Japan, China, and Southeast Asia. In the 15th century, Shō Hashi unified the three kingdoms of Okinawa and established the Ryukyu Kingdom. The kingdom prospered through intermediary trade and developed its own distinct culture, languages, and political system centered on Shuri Castle. In 1609, the Satsuma Domain invaded the islands, bringing them under Japanese control, although the kingdom formally maintained its independence. In 1879, the Meiji government reorganized the territory as Okinawa Prefecture. During World War II, the Battle of Okinawa caused devastating destruction and loss of life. After the war, the islands were placed under U.S. administration until they were returned to Japan in 1972.

== Etymology ==
The name "Ryūkyū" originates from Chinese writings. The Chinese monk Jianzhen, who traveled to Japan in the mid-8th century CE to promote Buddhism, wrote "Okinawa" as 阿児奈波 (anjenaʒpa).

== Early history ==
=== Prehistoric period ===
The ancestry of the modern-day Ryukyuan people is disputed. One theory claims that the earliest inhabitants of these islands crossed a prehistoric land bridge from modern-day China, with later additions of Austronesians, Micronesians, and Japanese merging with the population. The time when human beings appeared in Okinawa remains unknown. The earliest human bones were those of the Yamashita Cave Man, about 32,000 years ago, followed by the Pinza-Abu Cave Man, the Miyakojima Cave Man about 26,000 years ago and the Minatogawa Man about 18,000 years ago. They probably came through China and were once considered to be the direct ancestors of those living in Okinawa. No stone tools were discovered with them. For the following 12,000 years, no trace of archaeological sites was discovered after the Minatogawa Man site. Multiple genetic studies, however, found that there was no genetic input from Austronesian-related populations in Ryukyuans.

=== Okinawa midden culture ===
Okinawa midden culture or shell heap culture is divided into the early shell heap period corresponding to the Jōmon period of Japan and the latter shell heap period corresponding to the Yayoi period of Japan. However, the use of Jōmon and Yayoi of Japan is questionable in Okinawa. In the former, it was a hunter-gatherer society, with wave-like opening Jōmon pottery. In the latter part of Jōmon period, archaeological sites moved near the seashore, suggesting the engagement of people in fishery. In Okinawa, rice was not cultivated during the Yayoi period but began during the latter period of shell-heap age. Shell rings for arms made of shells obtained in the Sakishima Islands, namely Miyakojima and Yaeyama islands, were imported by Japan. In these islands, the presence of shell axes, 2,500 years ago, suggests the influence of a southeastern-Pacific culture.

=== Mythology, the Shunten Dynasty and the Eiso Dynasty ===
The first history of Ryukyu was written in Chūzan Seikan ("Mirrors of Chūzan"), which was compiled by Shō Shōken (1617–1675), also known as Haneji Chōshū. The Ryukyuan creation myth is told, which includes the establishment of Tenson as the first king of the islands and the creation of the Noro, female priestesses of the Ryukyuan religion. The throne was usurped from one of Tenson's descendants by a man named Riyu. Chūzan Seikan then tells the story of a Japanese samurai, Minamoto no Tametomo (1139–1170), who fought in the Hogen Rebellion of 1156 and fled first to the Izu Islands and then to Okinawa. He had relations with the sister of the Aji of Ōzato and sired Shunten, who then led a popular rebellion against Riyu and established his own rule at Urasoe Castle. Most historians, however, discount the Tametomo story as a revisionist history that is intended to legitimize Japanese domination over Okinawa.

=== Gusuku period ===
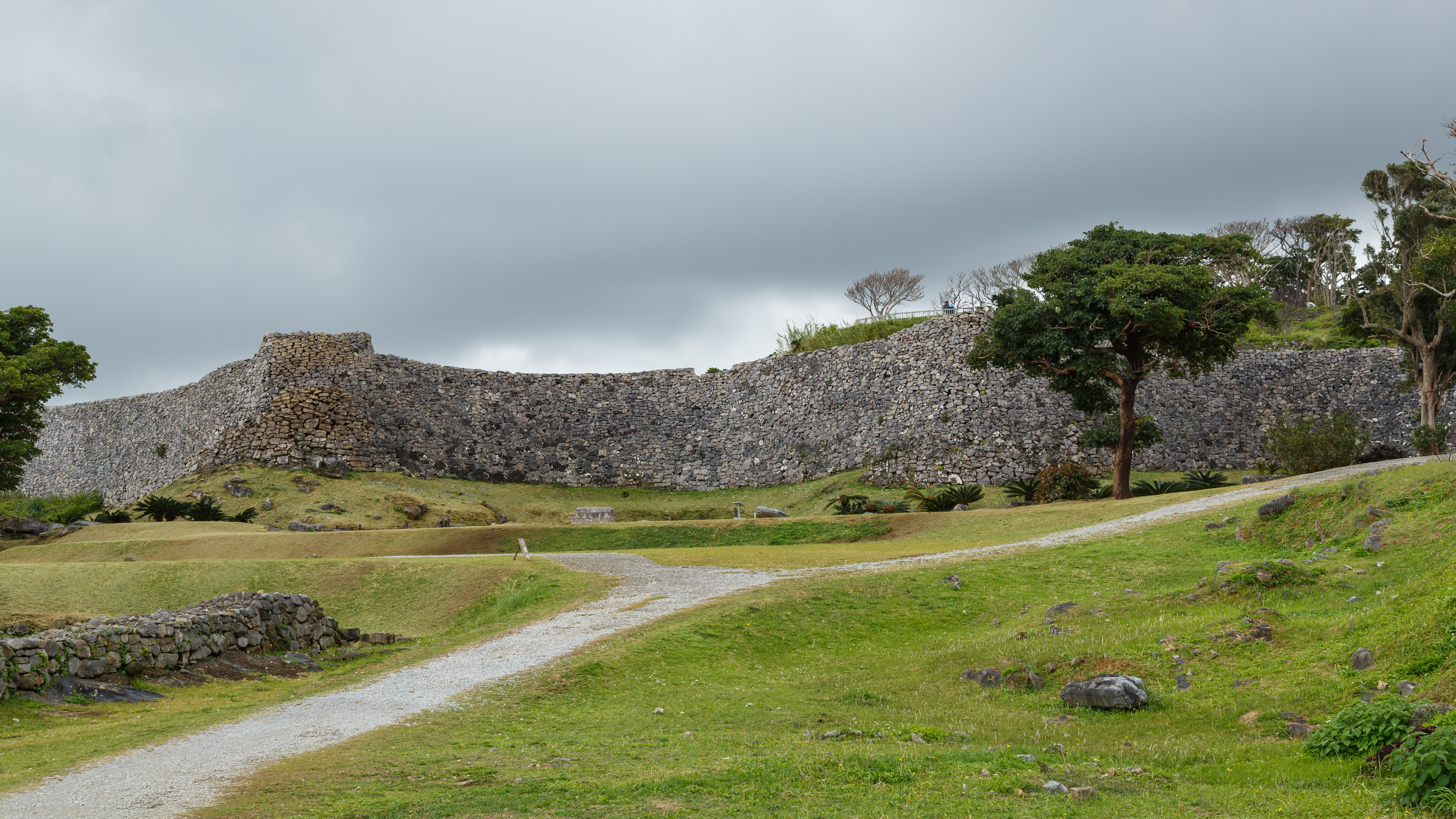
Nakijin Castle (今帰仁城) built during the Sanzan Period

Gusuku is the term used for the distinctive Okinawan form of castles or fortresses. Multiple gusukus and related cultural remains in the Ryukyu Islands have been listed by UNESCO as World Heritage Sites under the title Gusuku Sites and Related Properties of the Kingdom of Ryukyu. After the midden culture, agriculture started about the 12th century, with the center moving from the seashore to higher places. This period is called the gusuku period. There are three perspectives regarding the nature of gusukus: 1. a holy place, 2. dwellings encircled by stones, 3. a castle of a leader of a people. In this period, porcelain trade between Okinawa and other countries became busy, and Okinawa became an important relay point in East Asian trade. Ryukyuan kings, such as Shunten and Eiso, were considered to be important governors. In 1272, Kublai Khan ordered Ryukyu to submit to Mongol suzerainty, but Eiso refused. In 1276, the Mongol envoys returned, but were driven off the island by the Ryukyuans.

== Three-Kingdom period ==
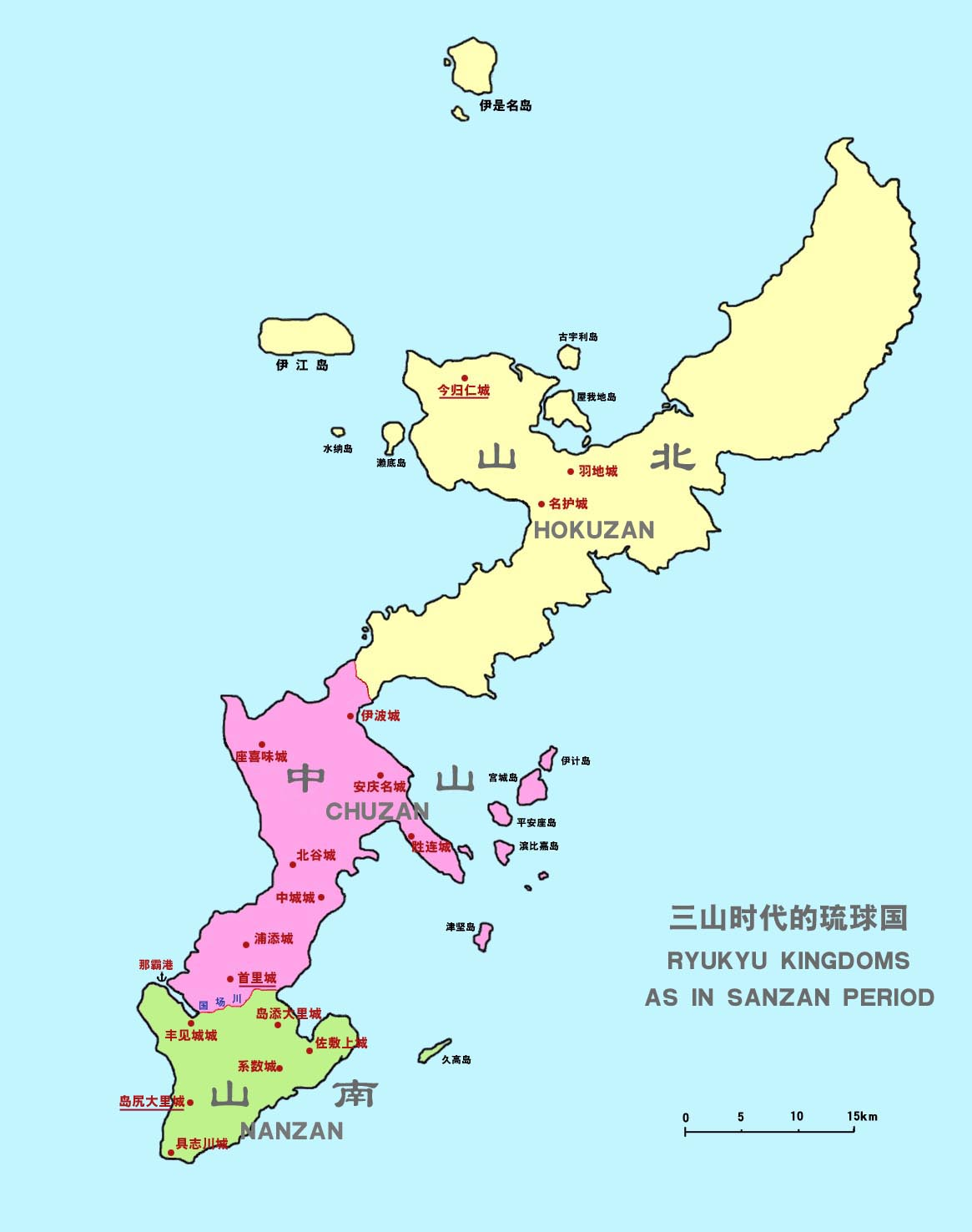
Three Kingdoms

The Three-Kingdom period, also known as the Sanzan period (三山時代, Sanzan-jidai) (Three Mountains), lasted from 1322 until 1429. There was a gradual consolidation of power under the Shō family. Shō Hashi (1372–1439) conquered Chūzan, the middle kingdom, in 1404 and made his father, Shō Shishō, the king. He conquered Hokuzan, the northern kingdom, in 1416 and conquered the southern kingdom, Nanzan, in 1429, thereby unifying the three kingdoms into a single Ryukyu Kingdom. Shō Hashi was then recognized as the ruler of the Ryukyu Kingdom (or Liuqiu Kingdom in Chinese) by the Ming Emperor of China, who presented him a red lacquerware plaque known as the Chūzan Tablet.

== Ryukyu Kingdom ==
=== 1429–1609 ===
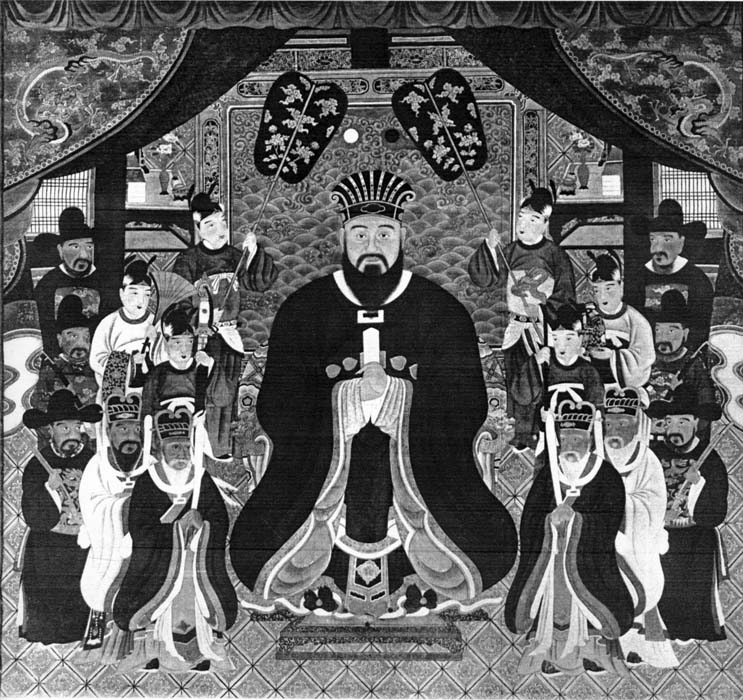
King Shō Shin

Many Chinese moved to Ryukyu to serve the government or to engage in business during this period. In 1392, during the Hongwu Emperor's reign, the Ming dynasty had sent 36 Chinese families from Fujian at the request of the Ryukyuan king to manage oceanic dealings in the kingdom. A number of Ryukyuan officials were descended from these Chinese immigrants, being born in China or having Chinese grandfathers. They assisted the Ryukyuans in advancing their technology and diplomatic relations.

=== Satsuma domination (1609–1871) ===
The invasion of the Ryukyu Kingdom by the Shimazu clan of Japan's Satsuma Domain took place in April 1609. Three thousand men and more than one hundred war-junks sailed from Kagoshima at the southern tip of Kyushu. The invaders defeated the Ryukyuans in the Amami Islands, then at Nakijin Castle on Okinawa Island. The Satsuma samurai made a second landing near Yomitanzan and marched overland to Urasoe Castle, which they captured. Their war-junks attempted to take the port city of Naha, but they were defeated by the Ryukyuan coastal defences. Finally Satsuma captured Shuri Castle, the Ryukyuan capital, and King Shō Nei. Only at this point did the King famously tell his army that "nuchidu takara" (life is a treasure), and they surrendered.

After 1609 the Ryukyuan kings became vassals of Satsuma. Though recognized as an independent kingdom, the islands were occasionally also referred to as being a province of Japan. The Shimazu introduced a policy banning sword ownership by commoners. This led to the development of the indigenous Okinawan martial arts, which utilize domestic items as weapons. This period of effective outside control also featured the first international matches of Go, as Ryukyuan players came to Japan to test their skill. This occurred in 1634, 1682, and 1710.

In the 17th century the Ryukyu Kingdom thus became both a tributary of China and a vassal of Japan. Because China would not make a formal trade agreement unless a country was a tributary state, the kingdom served as a convenient loophole for Japanese trade with China. When Japan officially closed foreign trade, the only exceptions for foreign trade were with the Dutch through Nagasaki, with the Ryukyu Kingdom through the Satsuma Domain, and with Korea through Tsushima. Perry's "Black Ships", official envoys from the United States, came in 1853.

=== Ryukyu Domain (1872–1879) ===
In 1872 the Ryukyu Kingdom was reconfigured as a feudal domain (han). The people were described as appearing to be a "connecting link" between the Chinese and Japanese. After the Taiwan Expedition of 1874, Japan's role as the protector of the Ryukyuan people was acknowledged, but the fiction of the Ryukyu Kingdom's independence was partially maintained until 1879. In 1878 the islands were listed as a "tributary" to Japan. The largest island was listed as "Tsju San", meaning "middle island". Others were listed as Sannan in the south and Sanbok in the North Nawa. The main port was listed as "Tsju San". It was open to foreign trade. Agricultural produce included tea, rice, sugar, tobacco, camphor, fruits, and silk. Manufactured products included cotton, paper, porcelain, and lacquered ware.

== Japan annexation of the Ryukyu Kingdom ==
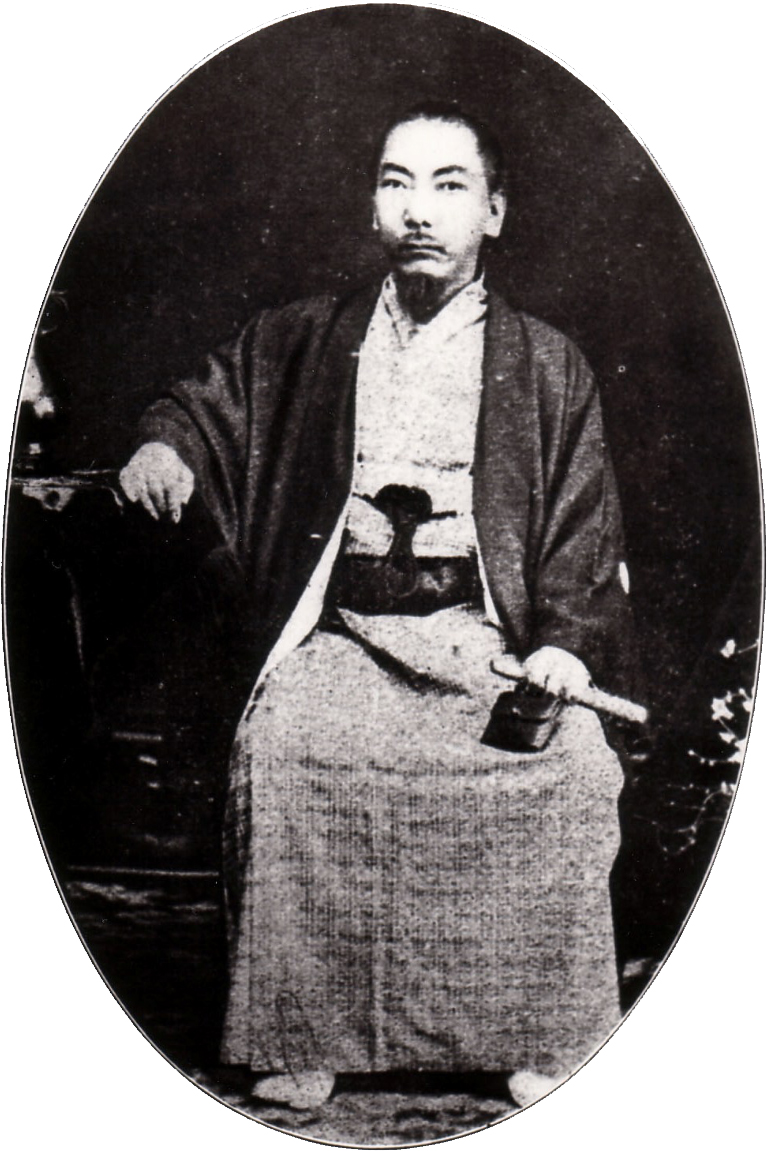
The last King Shō Tai

In 1879, Japan declared its intention to annex the Ryukyu Kingdom. China protested and asked former U.S. President Ulysses Grant, then on a diplomatic tour of Asia, to intercede. One option considered involved Japan annexing the islands from Amami Island north, China annexing the Miyako and Yaeyama islands, and the central islands remaining an independent Ryukyu Kingdom. When the negotiation eventually failed, Japan annexed the entire Ryukyu archipelago. Thus, the Ryukyu han was abolished and replaced by Okinawa Prefecture by the Meiji government. The monarchy in Shuri was abolished and the deposed king Shō Tai was forced to relocate to Tokyo. In compensation, he was made a marquis in the Meiji system of peerage.

== Okinawa and World War II ==
In the years leading up to World War II, the Japanese government sought to reinforce national solidarity in the interests of militarization. In part, they did so by means of conscription, mobilization, and nationalistic propaganda. A number of the people of the Ryukyu Islands, despite having spent only a generation as full Japanese citizens, were interested in proving their value to Japan in spite of prejudice expressed by mainland Japanese people.

In 1943, during World War II, the US president asked its ally, the Republic of China, if it would lay claim to the Ryukyus after the war. "The President then referred to the question of the Ryukyu Islands and enquired more than once whether China would want the Ryukyus. The Generalissimo replied that China would be agreeable to joint occupation of the Ryukyus by China and the United States and, eventually, joint administration by the two countries under the trusteeship of an international organization."

=== Battle of Okinawa (April 1 – June 22, 1945) ===
The Battle of Okinawa was one of the last major battles of World War II, claiming the lives of an estimated 120,000 combatants. The Ryukyus were the only inhabited part of Japan to experience a land battle during World War II. In addition to the Japanese military personnel who died in the Battle for Okinawa, well over one third of the civilian population, which numbered approximately 300,000 people, were killed. A number of important documents, artifacts, and sites related to Ryukyuan history and culture were also destroyed, including the royal Shuri Castle.

Due to fears concerning their fate during and after the invasion, the Okinawan people hid in caves and in family tombs. Several mass deaths occurred, such as in the "Cave of the Virgins", where multiple Okinawan school girls committed suicide by jumping off cliffs for fear of rape. Similarly, whole families committed suicide or were killed by near relatives in order to avoid suffering what they believed would be a worse fate at the hands of American forces; for instance, on Zamami Island at Zamami Village, almost everyone living on the island committed suicide two days after the Americans landed. The Americans had made plans to safeguard the Okinawans; however, their fears were not unfounded, as killing of civilians and destruction of civilian property did take place. For example, on Aguni Island, 90 residents were killed and 150 houses were destroyed.

Massive casualties in the Yaeyama Islands caused the Japanese military to force people to evacuate from their towns to the mountains, even though malaria was prevalent there. Fifty-four percent of the island's population died due to starvation and disease. Later, islanders unsuccessfully sued the Japanese government. A number of military historians believe that the ferocity of the Battle of Okinawa led directly to the American decision to use the atomic bomb on Hiroshima and Nagasaki. A prominent holder of this view is Victor Davis Hanson, who states it explicitly in his book Ripples of Battle: "because the Japanese on Okinawa, including native Okinawans, were so fierce in their defense (even when cut off, and without supplies), and because casualties were so appalling, many American strategists looked for an alternative means to subdue mainland Japan, other than a direct invasion."

== Post-war occupation and history since reversion ==
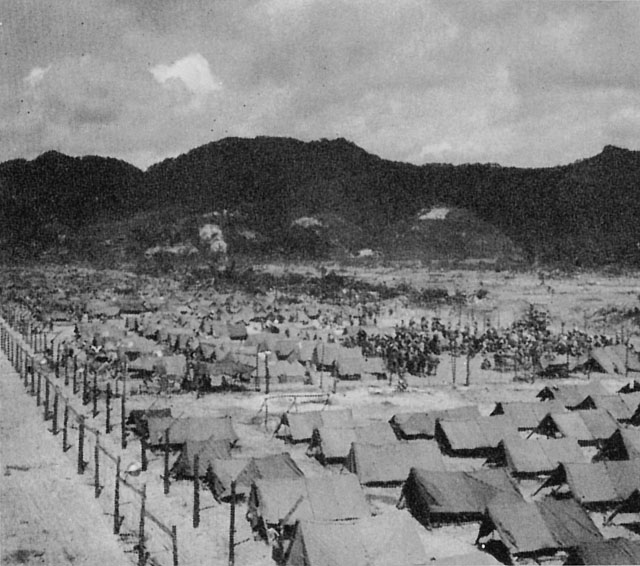
Stockade housing some of the thousands of Japanese troops who surrendered in the last stages of the campaign on Okinawa (1945)

On November 21, 1969, a Joint Communique was issued by President Nixon and Prime Minister Eisaku Sato, with the US president agreeing to return the Ryukyus to Japan in 1972. U.S. President Richard Nixon and Japanese Prime Minister Eisaku Satō later signed the Okinawa Reversion Agreement in Washington, D.C. on June 17, 1971.

=== Alleged use of Agent Orange in Okinawa ===
Evidence suggests that the US military's Project 112 tested biochemical agents on US marines in Okinawa in the 1960s. Later, suggestions were made that the US may have stored and used Agent Orange at its bases and training areas on the island. In at least one location where Agent Orange was reportedly used, there have been incidences of leukemia among locals, one of the listed effects of Agent Orange exposure. Drums that were unearthed in 2002 in one of the reported disposal locations were seized by the Okinawa Defense Bureau, an agency of Japan's Ministry of Defense, which has not issued a report on what the drums contained. The United States denies that Agent Orange was ever present on Okinawa. Thirty US military veterans claim that they saw Agent Orange on the island. Three of them have been awarded related disability benefits by the US Veteran's administration. The locations of suspected Agent Orange contamination include Naha port, Higashi, Camp Schwab, and Chatan. In May 2012, it was claimed that the US transport ship USNS Schuyler Otis Bland (T-AK-277) had transported herbicides to Okinawa on April 25, 1962. The defoliant might have been tested in Okinawa's northern area between Kunigami and Higashi by the US Army's 267th Chemical Service Platoon to assess its potential usefulness in Vietnam. A retired Marine Lieutenant Colonel, Kris Roberts, told The Japan Times that his base maintenance team unearthed leaking barrels of unknown chemicals at Marine Corps Air Station Futenma in 1981. In 2012 a US Army environmental assessment report, published in 2003, was discovered which stated that 25,000 55-gallon drums of Agent Orange had been stored on Okinawa before being taken to Johnston Atoll for disposal. In February 2013, an internal US DoD investigation concluded that no Agent Orange had been transported to, stored, or used on Okinawa. No veterans or former base workers were interviewed for the investigation.

=== Prosecution under the Status of Forces Agreement ===
In the Michael Brown Okinawa assault incident, a US Marine officer was convicted of attempted indecent assault and destruction of private property involving a local resident of Filipino descent who worked at Camp Courtney.

In February 2008, a U.S. Marine was arrested for allegedly raping a 14-year-old Japanese girl in Okinawa, and a member of the U.S. Army was suspected of raping a Filipino woman in Okinawa. U.S. Ambassador Thomas Schieffer flew to Okinawa and met with Okinawa governor Hirokazu Nakaima to express U.S. concern over the cases and offer cooperation in the investigation. U.S. Forces Japan designated February 22 as a Day of Reflection for all U.S. military facilities in Japan, setting up a Sexual Assault Prevention and Response Task Force in an effort to prevent similar incidents.

=== Planned development of American bases ===
Base-related revenue makes up 5% of the total economy. If the U.S. vacated the land, it is claimed that the island would be able to generate more money from tourism by the increased land available for development.

Other complaints are that the military bases disrupt the lives of the Okinawan people; the American military occupy more than a fifth of the main island. The biggest and most active air force base in east Asia, Kadena Air Base, is based on the island; the islanders complain the base produces large amounts of noise and is dangerous in other ways. In 1959 a jet fighter crashed into a school on the island, killing 17 children and injuring 121. On August 13, 2004, a U.S. military helicopter crashed into Okinawa International University, injuring the three crew members on board. The U.S. military arrived on scene first then physically barred local police from participating in the investigation of the crash. The US did not allow local authorities to examine the scene until six days after the crash. In a similar manner, unexploded ordnance from WWII continues to be a danger, especially in sparsely populated areas where it may have lain undisturbed or been buried.

== Notable people ==
- Isamu Chō was an officer in the Imperial Japanese Army known for his support of ultranationalist politics and involvement in a number of attempted military and right-wing coup d'etats in pre-World War II Japan.
- Takuji Iwasaki was a Japanese meteorologist, biologist, ethnologist historian.
- Uechi Kanbun was the founder of Uechi-ryū, one of the primary karate styles of Okinawa.
- Ōta Minoru was an admiral in the Imperial Japanese Navy during World War II, and the final commander of the Japanese naval forces defending the Oroku Peninsula during the Battle of Okinawa.
- Akira Shimada was a governor of Okinawa Prefecture. He was sent to Okinawa in 1945 and died in the battle.
- Mitsuru Ushijima was the Japanese general at the Battle of Okinawa, during the final stages of World War II.
- Kentsū Yabu was a prominent teacher of Shōrin-ryū karate in Okinawa from the 1910s until the 1930s, and was among the first people to demonstrate karate in Hawaii.
- Simon Bolivar Buckner Jr., an American Lieutenant-General, was killed during the closing days of the Battle of Okinawa by enemy artillery fire, making him the highest-ranking US military officer to have been killed by enemy fire during World War II.
- Ernest Taylor Pyle was an American journalist who wrote as a roving correspondent for the Scripps Howard newspaper chain from 1935 until his death in combat during World War II. He died in Ie Jima, Okinawa.

== See also ==
- History of the Amami Islands
- History of the Sakishima Islands
- Bernard Jean Bettelheim
- Ethnic issues in Japan
- Himeyuri students
- Iha Fuyū
- Gusuku
- Mudan incident
- Okinawa Prefecture
- Pechin
- Ryukyu Kingdom
  - King of Ryukyu
- Ryukyuan people
- Shuri Castle
