= Daughter of Misato Shī =

Queen of the Kingdom of Chūzan

Daughter of Misato Shī 美里子之女
- Queen of Chūzan

Queen consort of the Kingdom of Chūzan
- Tenure: 1406-1421
- Predecessor: Queen of Bunei
- Successor: Machirugi, queen of Shō Hashi
- Burial: Sashiki Yōdore
- Spouse: Shō Shishō
- Issue: Shō Hashi ♂ Misato Ufuyā ♂ Hirata Ufuyā ♂ Yonabaru Ufuyā ♂ Tedokon Ufuyā ♂ Sashiki Noro ♀
- Father: Misato Shī
- Mother: Unknown

"Daughter of Misato Shī (Note: Misato Shī : Okinawan: Nzatu-nu-shī, lit. "the child of Misato".)" (美里子之女) or "Daughter of Misato Shī of Sashiki Village" (佐敷村美里子之女) is the name under which the queen consort of the first king of the first Shō Dynasty, Shō Shishō, is known. She is mentioned under this name in the notes of the Chūzan Seifu, in the "information obtained through oral tradition" and in the Kyūyō. Her personal name, as well as her birth and death dates, are not given in the official sources of Ryūkyūan history (Chūzan Seikan, Chūzan Seifu…).,

The location of Misato Shī’s residence is currently a sacred place inside Sashiki Gusuku.

== Union with Shishō ==
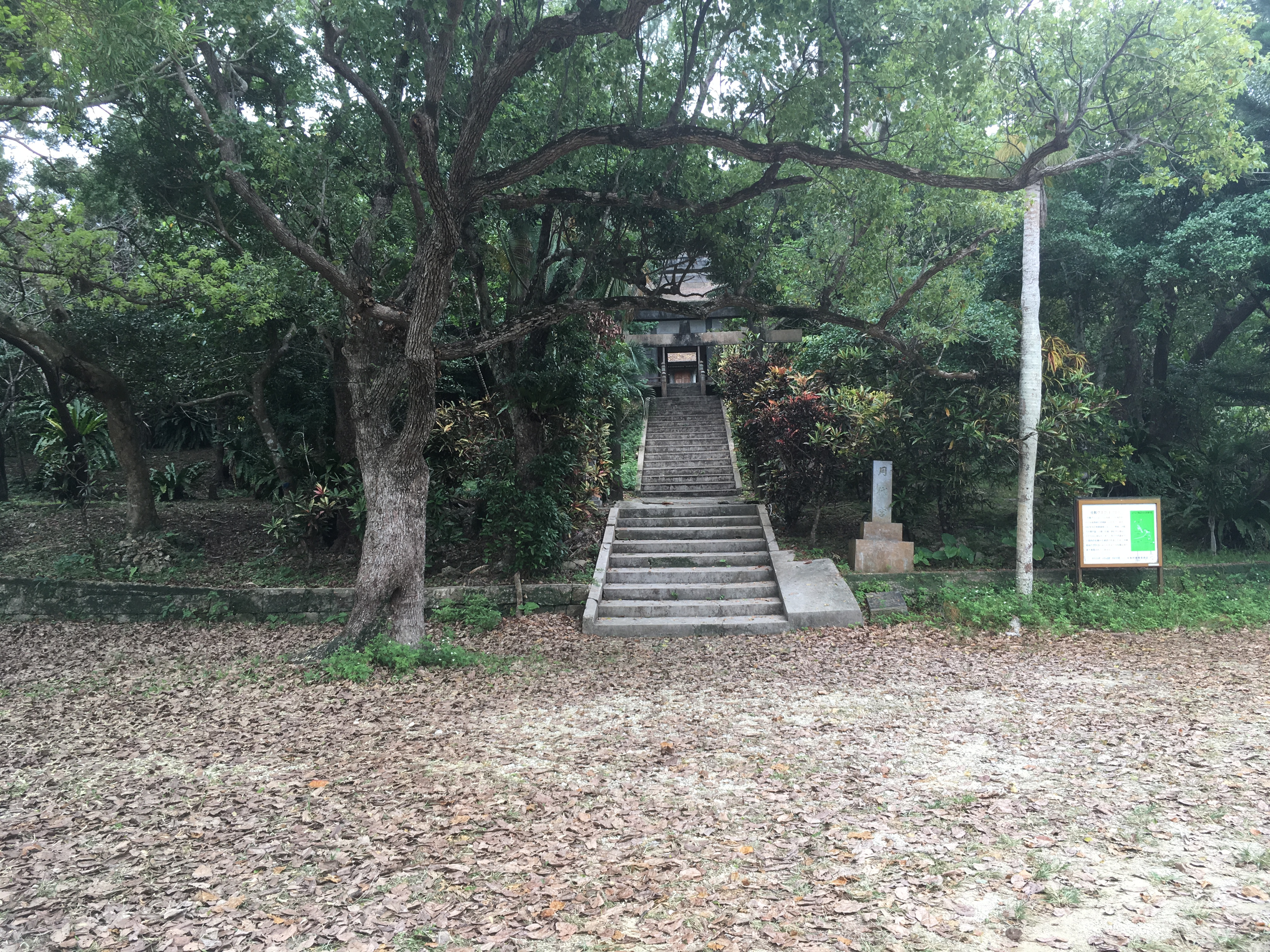
Sashiki Gusuku

Samekawa Ufushu, Shishō’s father, and Misato Shī are both vassals to Ufugusuku Aji, which explains the connexion between the two families. However, Misato Shī does not accept readily the union of his daughter with Shishō and Shō Hashi is born out of wedlocks. Local tradition says that, ashamed, the daughter of Misato Shī decides to abandon her illegitimate new born son in the Amachijō-gama (天次門ガマ) cave. When, remorseful, she comes back to fetch him, she sees that a large white bird has kept the baby warm with its feathers and that a female dog has fed him. She comes back with the baby to her parents’, who finally accept the union with Shishō.

Her husband Shō Shishō and her first son Shō Hashi gradually enlarge their power around Sashiki in the southern part of the island (Kingdom of Nanzan) before they overturn the king of the Kingdom of Chūzan in the central part of the island. Shō Shishō becomes king of Chūzan in 1406 and reigns until his death in 1421, founding the first Shō Dynasty.

== Issue ==
Her eldest son Shō Hashi unifies by gradual conquests the three polities that shared the land of Okinawa Island and creates a single kingdom.

She also gives birth to four other sons and one daughter in addition to Shō Hashi : Misato Ufuyā (美里大親 or 美里大比屋), Hirata Ufuyā (平田大比屋), Yonabaru Ufuyā (与那原大親), Tedokon Ufuyā (手登根大比屋, Tidukun ufuyā) and Sashiki Ufu-noro-kumoi (佐敷大のろくもい). Her daughter becomes the noro priestess of Sashiki.

== Burial place ==
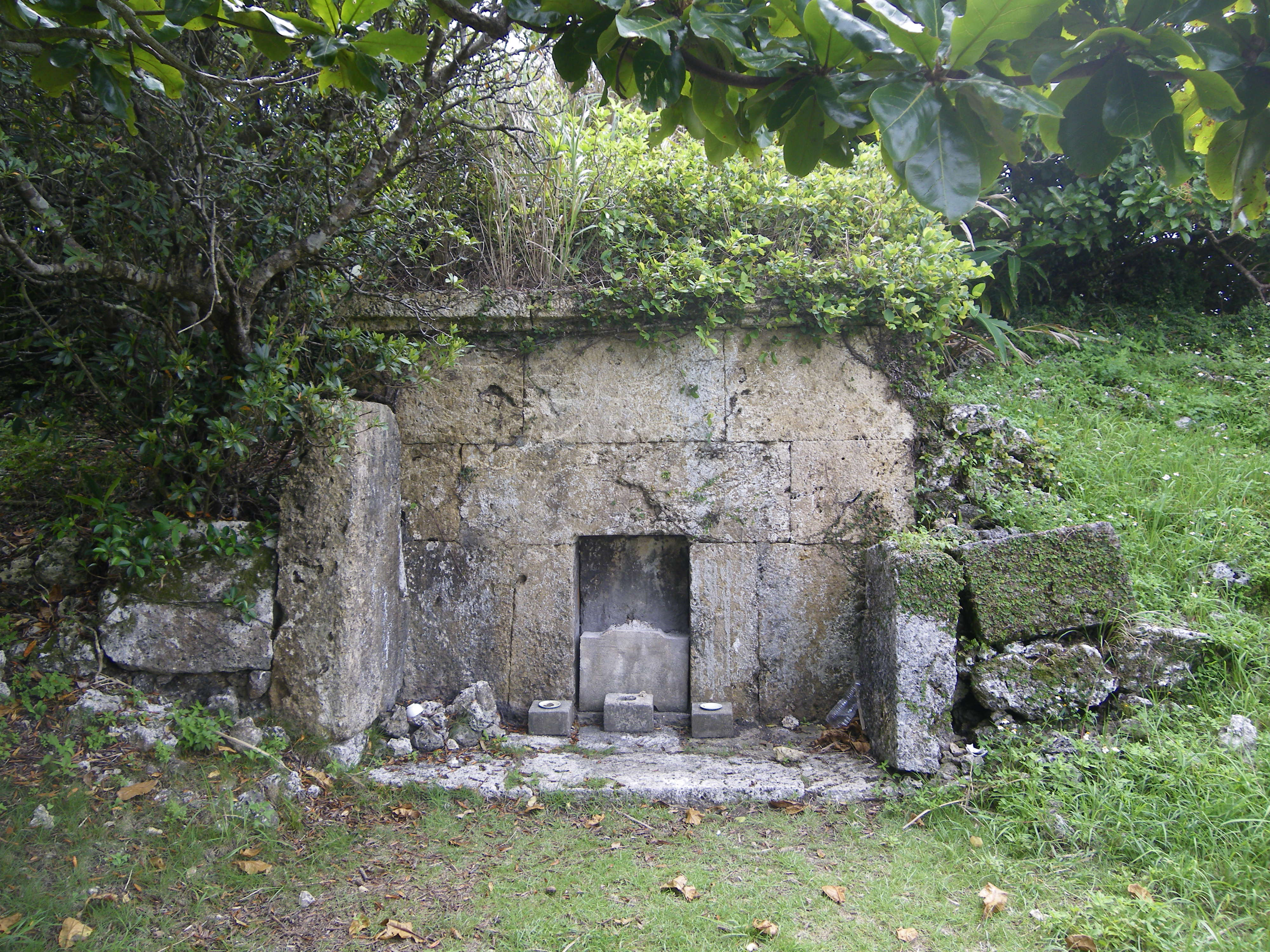
Sashiki Yōdore

She is buried in Sashiki Yōdore with Shishō, their daughter, their second son Misato Ufuyā and his wife, and Shishō’s parents.
