= Han'anchi =

Han'anchi 攀安知

King of Sanhoku
- Predecessor: Min
- Died: 1416 (traditional date); Nakijin Castle (traditional narrative)

Han'anchi (攀安知) was a local ruler of Okinawa Island, who was given the title of King of Sanhoku. Contemporary sources on Han'anchi are very scarce. He first appeared in Chinese diplomatic records in 1396 and his last contact was of 1415. His blood relationship with Min, the preceding King of Sanhoku, is unknown. After 1415, the King of Sanhoku did not contact China again. The Chinese records suggest that the Chinese had no information on when and how the king disappeared. Because the King of Chūzan continued tributary missions, the Chinese later speculated that the Kings of Sannan and Sanhoku had been removed by the King of Chūzan.

His real name is unknown. Modern attempts to decipher the enigmatic un-Okinawan name Han'anchi point to Haneji (羽地), a settlement in northern Okinawa (part of modern-day Nago City). Han'anchi can be either a corrupt form of Haneji or a contraction of Haneji Aji (local ruler of Haneji). The name suggests some connection to the settlement, but it is not confirmed by contemporary sources.

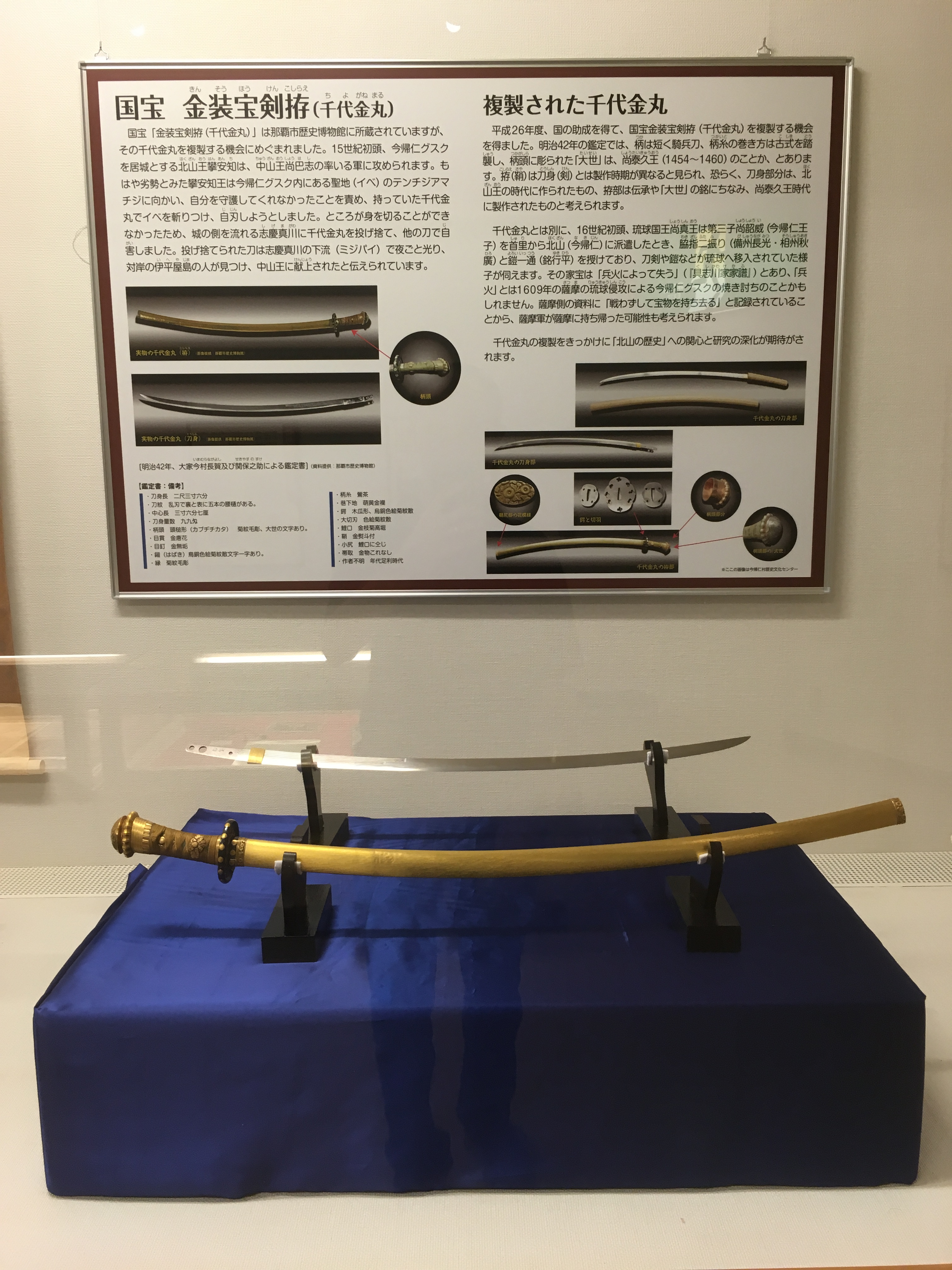
A replica of Chiyoganemaru, a Japanese blade that is said to be owned by the Aji of Nakijin.

== Aji of Nakijin ==
Okinawans later identified the King of Sanhoku as the Aji (local ruler) of Nakijin but had no information on how many rulers had assumed the title. Because Han'anchi was the last known King of Sanhoku, a logical consequence was that the Aji of Nakijin who was annihilated by Shō Hashi, the unifier of Okinawa Island, was Han'anchi. However, neither the Chūzan Seikan (1650) nor Sai Taku's edition of the Chūzan Seifu (1701) identified the Aji of Nakijin in question as such.

The Chūzan Seikan (1650) recorded a dramatic story about the downfall of the unnamed Aji of Nakijin, also known as King of Sanhoku. Shō Hashi, King of Sannan, subjugated Bunei, King of Chūzan, and took over the position in 1421. By that time, a large portion of the former realm of the King of Sanhoku had surrendered to Shō Hashi. The King of Sanhoku was a fierce warrior and prepared for the final battle with the King of Chūzan. Being informed of Sanhoku's possible offensive by the Aji of Haneji, Shō Hashi dispatched the Aji of Urasoe, the Aji of Goeku, and the Aji of Yuntanza to destroy the King of Sanhoku in 1422. Following a fierce defense, the king's castle fell. The king and his closest vassals committed suicide. Shō Hashi then appointed his second son Shō Chū as Nakijin Ōji to rule the remote north.

Sai Taku's edition of the Chūzan Seifu (1701) generally followed the Chūzan Seikan, but Sai On's edition of the Chūzan Seifu (1725) drastically changed the narrative. Having access to Chinese diplomatic records, he added the records of tributary missions sent under the name of the King of Sanhoku. The last king was now identified as Han'anchi. More importantly, he changed the date of the King of Sanhoku's downfall from 1422 to 1416. Sai On naïvely inferred that the King of Sanhoku was removed immediately after the last tributary mission of 1415. This modification created an unnatural gap between the downfall of the King of Sanhoku (1416) and the appointment of Shō Chū as Nakijin Ōji (1422).

== Notes ==
Preceded by Min	King of Sanhoku	Succeeded by None
