= Hokuzan =

One of three political entities which controlled Okinawa during Sanzan period

Coordinates: 26°41′N 127°58′E

Kingdom of Hokuzan 北山
- 1314–1416
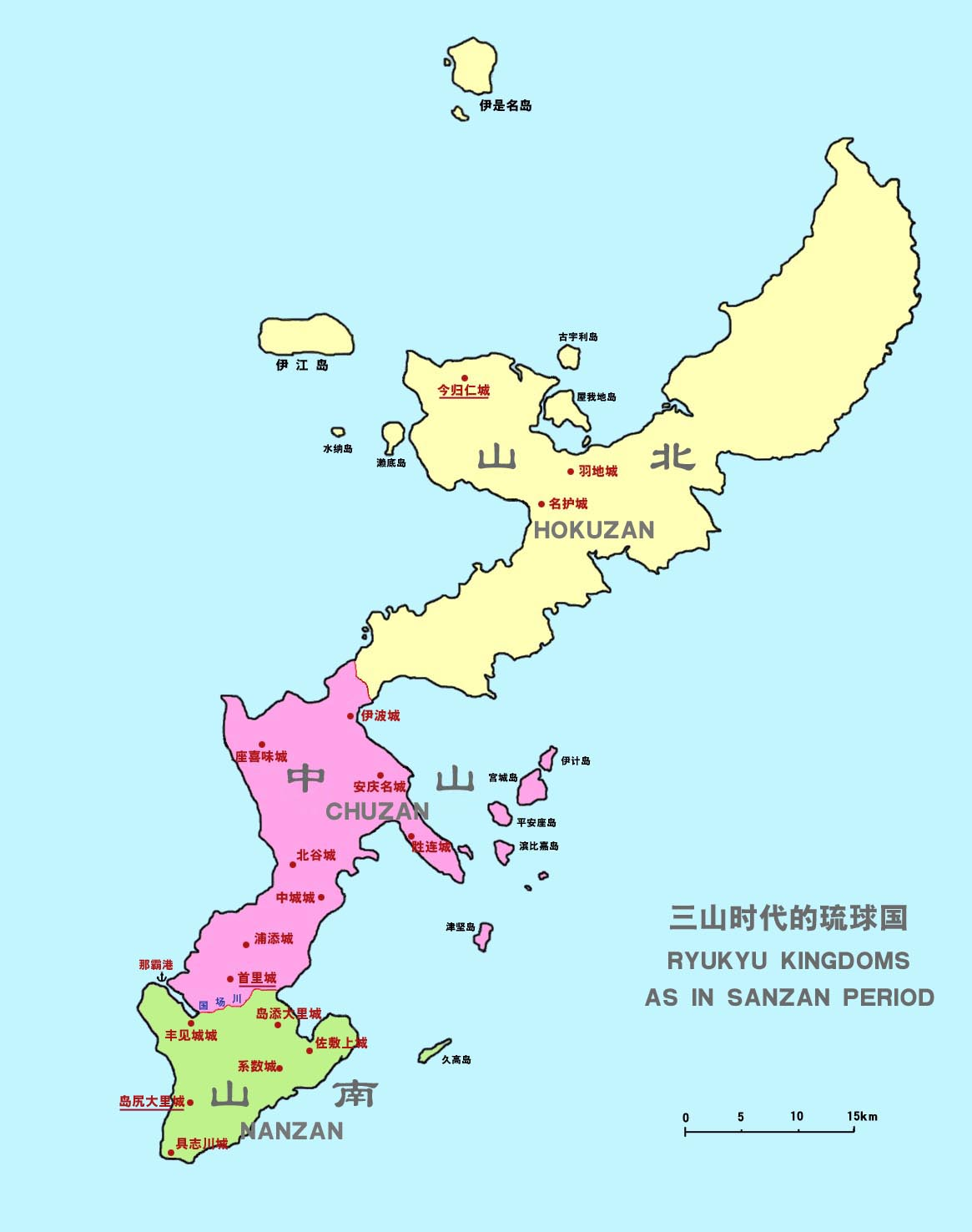
- Map of the Three Kingdoms (Sanzan) of Okinawa, with Hokuzan in yellow.
- Capital: Nakijin
- Common languages: Kunigami; Okinawan
- Religion: Ryukyuan religion
- Government: Monarchy
- King (国王)
  - 1322–1395: Haniji
  - 1396–1400: Min
  - 1401–1416: Hananchi
- History
  - Established: 1314
  - Ryukyu unification: 1416
  - Japanese invasion: 5 April 1609
Succeeded by
Ryūkyū Kingdom

Hokuzan (北山; Kunigami: Fukuuzan), also known as Sanhoku (山北, Okinawan: Sanfuku) before the 18th century, located in the north of Okinawa Island, was one of three independent political entities which controlled Okinawa in the 14th century during Sanzan period. The political entity was identified as a tiny country, a kingdom, or a principality by modern historians, however the rulers of Hokuzan were in fact not "kings" at all, but petty lords with their own retainers owing their direct service, and their own estates.

Okinawa, previously controlled by a number of local chieftains or lords, loosely bound by a paramount chieftain or king of the entire island, split into these three more solidly defined kingdoms within a few years after 1314; the Sanzan period thus began, and would end roughly one hundred years later, when Chūzan's King Shō Hashi (Note: Technically, Hashi's father Shō Shishō was king of Chūzan in 1416, and neither was called "Shō" until that name was granted them by the Ming court in 1422.) conquered Hokuzan in 1416 and Nanzan in 1429.

After the unification of Ryukyu, Hokuzan became one of three nominal fu (府, lit. "prefectures") of the Ryukyu Kingdom without administrative function.

== History ==
=== Sanzan period: "King of Sanhoku" ===
Hokuzan first came into being in 1314 when Tamagusuku inherited the role of head chieftain of all of Okinawa from his father Eiji. He did not have the charisma or leadership qualities to command the loyalty of all the local lords, and so the Lord of Nakijin, one of many powerful local chieftains, decamped north with a number of lesser chieftains loyal to him and established himself in Nakijin Castle. Another powerful chieftain relocated into the south and established the kingdom of Nanzan, leaving Tamagusuku in control only of the central part of the island, which thus became the kingdom of Chūzan.

Though Hokuzan was the largest of the three kingdoms, it was also the poorest and the most sparsely populated. Much of its land was wild, and its few farming or fishing villages were more primitive than those of the other two kingdoms. Nakijin Castle (城 gusuku) stood on an outcropping of the Motobu Peninsula, with drops of varying steepness on every side; the ruins which remain today indicate the development of a community of fair size around it, including residences for the king's vassals, and three shrines (拝所 uganju) to the native religion within the castle walls.

In addition to its deficiencies in agriculture and fishing, Hokuzan suffered from the disadvantage, relative to Chūzan, of holding no port to equal Naha (O. Naafa). A small junk trade used the inlet below the castle's promontory as a dock, and later Unten harbor. Nevertheless, the northern kingdom engaged in its share of trade with many of the other states in the region, including Java, Sumatra, and the Ayutthaya Kingdom of Siam. Chūzan entered a tributary relationship with Ming dynasty China in 1372, and Hokuzan and Nanzan were granted similar commercial status shortly afterwards.

Over roughly the next thirty years, only nine tribute missions were sent from Hokuzan to China; Nanzan sent nineteen and Chūzan sent fifty-two. Hokuzan also did not send any students to China, as Chūzan did.

Roughly twenty years later, in the 1390s, the kings of all three kingdoms died within a few years, and succession disputes erupted across the island; similar events occurred in Nanking at the same time, with the death of the Hongwu Emperor in 1398. Previously, China had only ever recognized one head of state on Okinawa, but now all three kingdoms sent envoys and vied for the prestige, wealth, and power that would come with China's favor; no response came from China for eleven years. In 1406, Bunei, King of Chūzan, was formally invested by representatives of the Ming Court in his position; the kings of Hokuzan would never enjoy this privilege.

Despite its economic and political advantages, Hokuzan posed a not insignificant threat to Chūzan, militarily, since its establishment. In the 1410s, however, disputes among the vassals of Hokuzan's king weakened the kingdom, and in 1416, Chūzan found an opportunity to strike after three of those vassals (anji) defected. Following a fierce defense, Nakijin castle fell, and the king and his closest vassals committed suicide.

=== After the unification: Hokuzan-fu ===
After the annexation of Sanhoku, Shō Hashi, king of Chūzan, appointed his second son Shō Chū the "Warden of Nakijin Castle, Sanhoku" (山北今帰仁城監守; commonly known as "Warden of Hokuzan" 北山監守) in 1422, a post which would remain for many years, holding little overall power, but serving to maintain order in the north on behalf of the Chūzan court at Shuri. The post was abolished by Shō Shitsu in 1665, the last warden was ordered to move to Shuri.

During the Ryukyu Kingdom period, Hokuzan was one of three nominal fu (府; lit. "prefectures") of the kingdom without administrative function. At the end of the 17th century, Sanhoku nominally comprised 9 magiri (間切): Onna, Kin, Kushi, Nago, Haneji, Motobu, Nakijin, Ōgimi, and Kunigami.

During King Shō Kei's reign, someone suggested that the capital should be moved to Nago. It was disapproved by the regent Sai On, finally, the capital was remained in Shuri. Also in the same period, the name "Sanhoku" (山北) was changed into "Hokuzan" (北山).

== Rulers of Hokuzan ==
Kings of Sanhoku 山北王
Name	Kanji	Reign	Line or dynasty	Notes
Haniji/Haneji	怕尼芝	1322?–1395?	Haniji Line	Lord of Nakijin, Hokuzan Kingdom
Min	珉	1396?–1400	Haniji Line	
Hananchi	攀安知	1401?–1416	Haniji Line	conquered by Shō Hashi, King of Chūzan in 1416.

Wardens of Nakijin Castle, Sanhoku 山北今帰仁城監守
Name	Kanji	Tenure	Line or dynasty	Notes
Shō Chū	尚忠	1416–1439	First Shō	second son of Shō Hashi
several wardens, names unknown (1439 – late 15th century)
Shō Shōi, Nakijin Ōji Chōten	尚韶威 今帰仁王子朝典	late 15th century – 16th century	Gushikawa Udun	third son of Shō Shin
Shō Kaishō, Nakijin Aji Chōshū	向介昭 今帰仁按司朝殊	16th century	Gushikawa Udun	
Shō Waken, Nakijin Aji Chōton	向和賢 今帰仁按司朝敦	16th century – 1591	Gushikawa Udun	
Shō Kokujun, Nakijin Aji Chōkō	向克順 今帰仁按司朝效	1591–1596	Gushikawa Udun	
Shō Kokushi, Nakijin Aji Chōyō	向克祉 今帰仁按司朝容	1596–1609	Gushikawa Udun	
Shō Jōso, Nakijin Aji Chōkei	向縄祖 今帰仁按司朝経	1609–1654	Gushikawa Udun	
Shō Jūken, Nakijin Aji Chōkō	向従憲 今帰仁按司朝幸	1654–1665	Gushikawa Udun	

== See also ==
- Ryukyuan missions to Imperial China
- Ryukyu Kingdom
- Imperial Chinese missions to the Ryukyu Kingdom
- List of monarchs of the Ryukyu Islands
