= Shiraho Saonetabaru Cave Ruins =

Paleoarchaeological site on Ishigaki, Yaeyama Islands, Japan

- 白保竿根田原洞穴遺跡 (Japanese)
- location in Japan
- 24°22′57″N 124°12′21″E
- Periods: Japanese Paleolithic
- Location: Ishigaki Island of the Yaeyama Islands
- Region: Japan

Site notes
- Public access: none

Shiraho Saonetabaru Cave Ruins (白保竿根田原洞穴遺跡, Shiraho Saonetabaru Dōketsu Iseki) is a paleoanthropological site located in the city of Ishigaki, Okinawa Japan. It is home to the oldest known human remains in Japan, dating back approximately 27,000 years, and the first known Paleolithic burial site in Japan. It was designated a National Historic Site in 2019.

== Overview ==
The Shiraho Saonetabaru is a limestone cave system distributed between Shiraho and Moriyama in the eastern part of Ishigaki City, Okinawa Prefecture, approximately 800 meters from the coast and 30–40 meters above sea level. It is located within the grounds of New Ishigaki Airport and was discovered during the airport's construction in 2007. During the initial archaeological excavation, remains of human heads, feet and arms were found, in all 9 bone fossils, by the Okinawa Limestone Cave Association between 2007 and 2009, and three human samples were dated by radiocarbon dating to between 20,000-16,000 years before present by the Okinawa Prefectural Archaeological Center, the University of the Ryukyus, and the University of Tokyo. In 2010, one of the remains, a skull fragment (left parietal bone) belonging to a man in his 20s or 30s, was confirmed to be the oldest in Japan, dating back approximately 20,000 years. Two other remains were confirmed to be approximately 18,000 and 15,000 years ago In the ruins were also found bones from wild boar and birds (one animal bone calibrated at 12,000 BP)), while during the three months in 2011 were discovered approximately 300 human bones from the stratum between 24,000-20,000 years old. Furthermore, the National Museum of Nature and Science conducted mitochondrial DNA analysis of 10 human bones excavated up to 2010, which provides clues to the maternal ancestry of the bones, and revealed that two of the four bones deemed to be the oldest in Japan (approximately 20,000-10,000 years old) belonged to a DNA type derived from southern origins known as haplogroup M7a.

In 2015, researchers from the University of the Ryukyus and University of Tokyo succeeded in radiocarbon dating three out of five of the bones tested. The three bones yielded the following dates: (20,030 to 18,100 years BP), (22,890 to 22,400 years BP) and (24,990 to 24,210 years BP).

The investigation held between 2012 and 2016 found more than 1,000 human fragments from at least 19 human skeletons, making this one of the largest Paleolithic human bone discoveries in the world.. The "No. 4" almost full skeleton was dated about 27,000 BP, being the oldest full skeleton discovered in East Asia and several thousand years older than the skeletons of the Minatogawa people. Due to the skeletons' postures, the site has been confirmed as the first graveyard in the Paleolithic age in Japan.

One of the bones (Bone No. 4) dates to approximately 27,000 years ago (calibrated age), making it the oldest remaining skeleton in Japan. It belongs to a man in his 30s or 40s, standing 165.2 cm tall, taller than the Minatogawa man (153 cm, approximately 20,000 years old). Significant wear on the upper jaw compared to the lower jaw suggests that the individual may have had unusual dental habits. The remains were lying face-up, knees folded toward the chest, and elbows bent so that both hands were near the face. They were found among rocks on the ground. This suggests that they were placed artificially, possibly resulting from a natural burial. The site where these human bones were discovered is the first Paleolithic burial site confirmed in Japan.

The oldest human bones in Japan, as measured directly to date, are those of the Hamakita man, discovered in Nekata Cave in Hamamatsu, Shizuoka, approximately 14,000 years ago. Furthermore, the oldest human bones in Japan, measured not from the bones themselves but from surrounding charcoal deposits, are those of the Yamashita Cave Man, discovered in 1968 in the First Cave in Yamashita Town, Naha City, Okinawa Prefecture, approximately 32,000 years ago

== See also ==
- Yamashita Cave Man
- Pinza-Abu Cave Man
- Minatogawa Man
- History of the Ryukyu Islands
- List of Historic Sites of Japan (Okinawa)
