= Yamashita Cave Man =

Hominin fossil

The Yamashita Cave People (山下洞人, Yamashita Dōjin) are the prehistoric humans known from many bones found in the Yamashita limestone cave located on the grounds of the Yamashita First Cave Site Park in Naha, Okinawa, Japan. The remains have been dated at 32,000±1000 years ago. The most important bones found in the cave in Yamashita are those of an approximately 6 to 8-year-old girl.

== See also ==
- Minatogawa Man
- Pinza-Abu Cave Man
- Shiraho Saonetabaru Cave Ruins
- History of the Ryukyu Islands
