= Minatogawa Man =

Hominin fossil

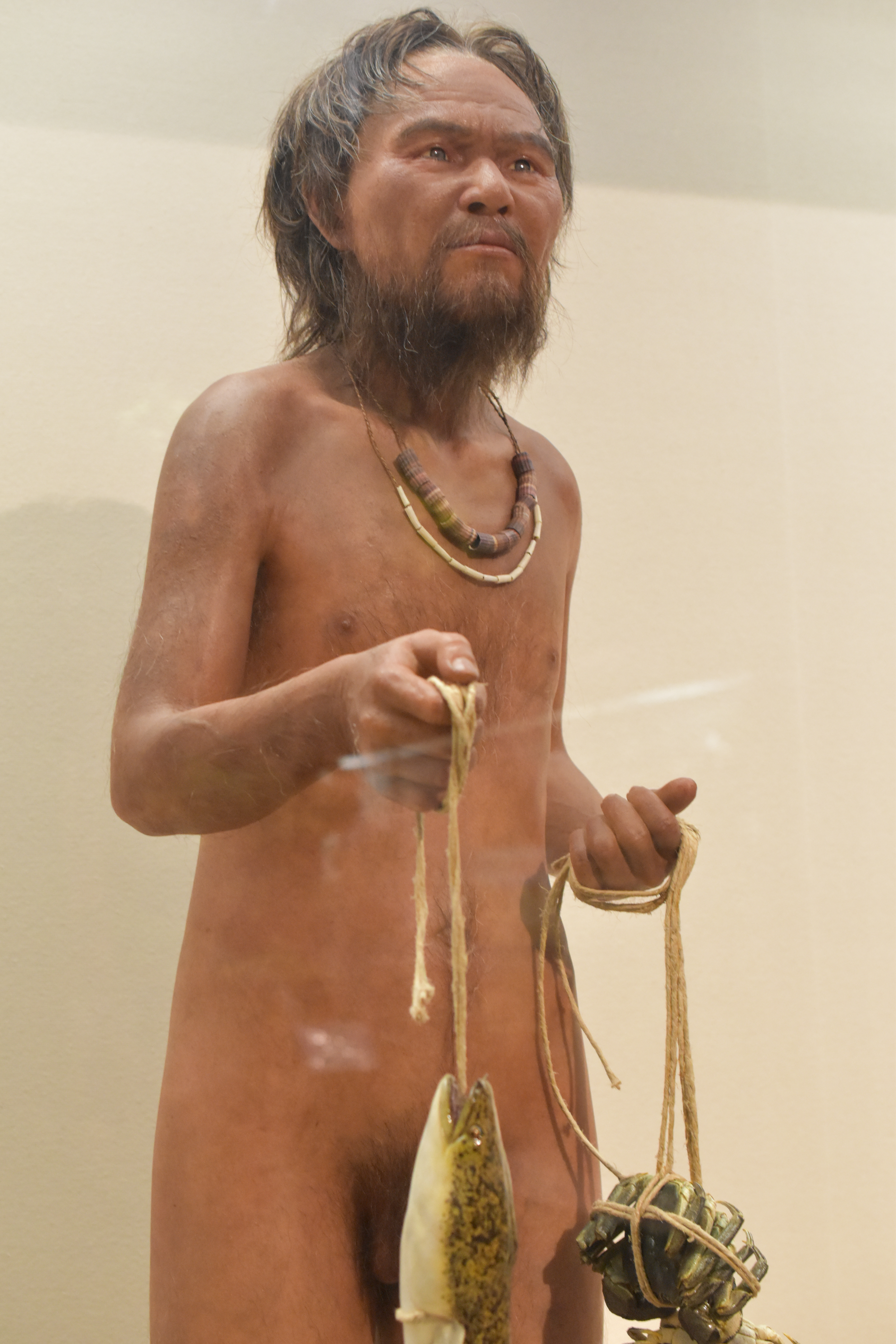
A reconstructed model of the Minatogawa Man at the Okinawa Prefectural Museum

The Minatogawa Man or Minatogawa specimens are the prehistoric population of Okinawa, Japan, represented by four skeletons, two male and two female, and some isolated bones dated between 20,000 and 22,000 years BCE. They are among the oldest skeletons of hominins yet discovered in Japan.

== History of the finds ==
The skeletons were found at the Minatogawa limestone quarry, located 10 km (6 mi) south of Naha, near the southern tip of the island. Okinawan businessman and amateur archaeologist Seiho Oyama noticed fossil bone fragments in some building stone blocks he had purchased from the quarry, and for two years he kept watch as the quarry was worked. In 1968, Oyama reported the finding of a human bone at the quarry to Hisashi Suzuki, a professor at Tokyo University.

A team led by Suzuki excavated the site during three seasons (1968, 1970 and 1974). Their finds were described in 1982. The skeletons are now in the Anthropology Museum, Tokyo University.

== Description ==
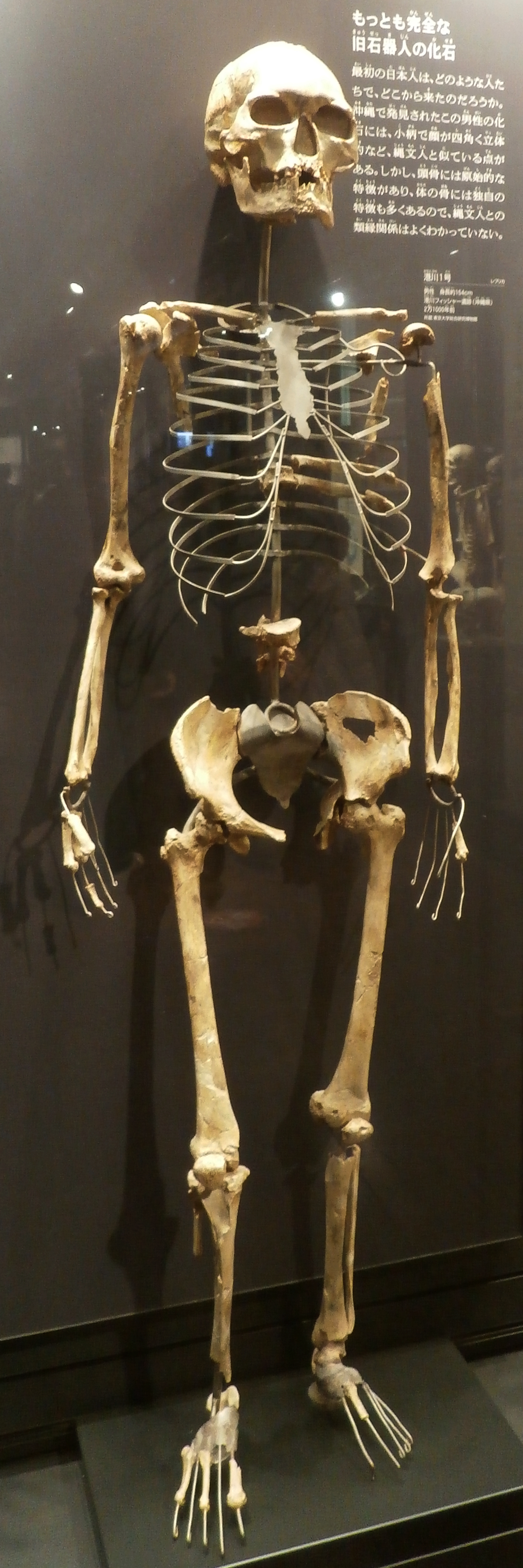
Fossil of Minatogawa Man 1, replica, exhibited in the National Museum of Nature and Science in Tokyo

All skeletons were found buried inside a vertical fissure in the limestone rock, about 1 m (3 ft 3 in) wide, which had been filled over millennia by residual red clay mixed with travertine, limestone fragments and bones. Suzuki's excavation was limited to the part of the fissure that was exposed on the quarry's face, 5 m (16 ft) high and 20 m (66 ft) above the present sea level, and extended about 6 m (20 ft) into the cliff behind.

The bones recovered from that fissure belonged to between 5 and 9 distinct individuals (two males and the rest females), mixed with over 200 fragments of deer and boar bones. The finds lay on a diagonal band extending down and forward by about 6 m (20 ft) within the fissure. The lowest-placed skeleton (Minatogawa I, a male about 25 years old) was standing upside-down, but his bones were mostly in their anatomical positions. The other skeletons were found with their bones all mixed up and scattered over several meters. Skeleton IV, in particular, was found as two sets of bones separated by a couple of meters; his skull has a perforation that seems to have been caused by a sharp hard point, and his left and right arms seem to have been fractured the same way. Suzuki conjectures that the individuals were killed with spears or arrows by enemies who cannibalized their victims (breaking bones in the process) and then threw the remains into the fissure, which had been used as a trash dump (which explains the animal bones).

The individuals were rather short at about 155 cm (5 ft 1 in) for the males and 140 cm (4 ft 7 in) for the females, and their cranial capacity was close to the lower end of the range of the latter prehistoric Jōmon (16,000 to 2,000 years ago) and modern Japanese people. The teeth were extremely worn out, suggesting an abrasive diet. In one of the mandibles, the two median incisors had been knocked out at the same time, well before death—a custom that is known to have been practiced by the Jōmon people.

Geologists have estimated that the fissure was created by an uplifting that bent and fractured the limestone rock layers, more than 100,000 years ago. Charcoal fragments in the fissure have been carbon-14-dated to about 16,000 and 18,000 years ago.

=== Physical characteristics ===
All Minatogawa samples fall within the range of Eastern and Southeastern Asian craniometric diversity. Due to certain features, the Minatogawa samples are regarded as distinct from Jōmon peoples, although a close relationship could neither be disproven or proven. According to Baba & Narasaki (1991), the Minatogawa specimens had "Mongoloid" traits but partially differed from other Jomon period samples. Kaifu et al. (2011) similarly observed certain distinct traits between the Paleolithic Minatogawa specimens and Neolithic Jomon samples, and suggested that the Minatogawa specimens were closer to Southeastern Asian and Pacific groups than other Jōmon samples. In line with the peopling of Eastern Asia, it is suggested that the ancestors of Minatogawa specimens similarly arrived from a southern route, possibly diverged from other East Asians already in Southeast Asia.

Certain differences were observed between different Minatogawa samples as well, presenting a more complicated picture. The Nekata Minatogawa sample was found to be closer aligned to other Jomon samples, than the Tibia Minatogawa sample, but their individual variation does not necessarily point to two distinct groups.

Hisashi Suzuki suggested that the Minatogowa man was "proto-Mongoloid" and had ties with several specimens from southern China and northern Indochina during the Pleistocene era. They possessed features such as short stature, small cranium capacities, low and broad faces with narrow foreheads, well-developed supraorbital ridges, low orbits, wide noses with remarkably receded nasal root, elevated and pinched noses and medially rotated malar bones. These features are well-preserved in present Okinawans and to an extent, natives from Taiwan, the Philippines and Borneo due to shared Pleistocene ancestors.

=== Genetics ===
Previously it was suggested that the Minatogawa specimens may have not been closely related to other Jomon period samples or modern Japanese people. However, recent DNA analyses revealed genetic links to both Jomon and Japanese people, as well as to the broader East Asian population cluster. The Minatogawa specimens' genetic type, based on extracted DNA alleles, was found to be common among modern Japanese peoples, Jomon and Yayoi samples, although being not their direct ancestor. The scientists (Mizuno et al. 2021) suggested that the Japanese have distant ancestral ties to the Minatogawa specimens. Jun Gojobori, a lecturer of physical anthropology at the Graduate University for Advanced Studies and one of lead authors of the study, concluded that Eastern Asian populations, specifically on the Japanese archipelago, show genetic continuity with ancient samples.

According to the Mizuno et al. study, one of the skeletons (Minatogawa 1) belonged to maternal haplogroup M, without any substitutions that define the subgroups of haplogroup M.

== See also ==
- Yamashita Cave Man
- Pinza-Abu Cave Man
- Shiraho Saonetabaru Cave Ruins
- History of the Ryukyu Islands
