= Yamashita First Cave Site Park =

Urban park in Naha, Okinawa, Japan

- 山下第一洞穴遺跡公園
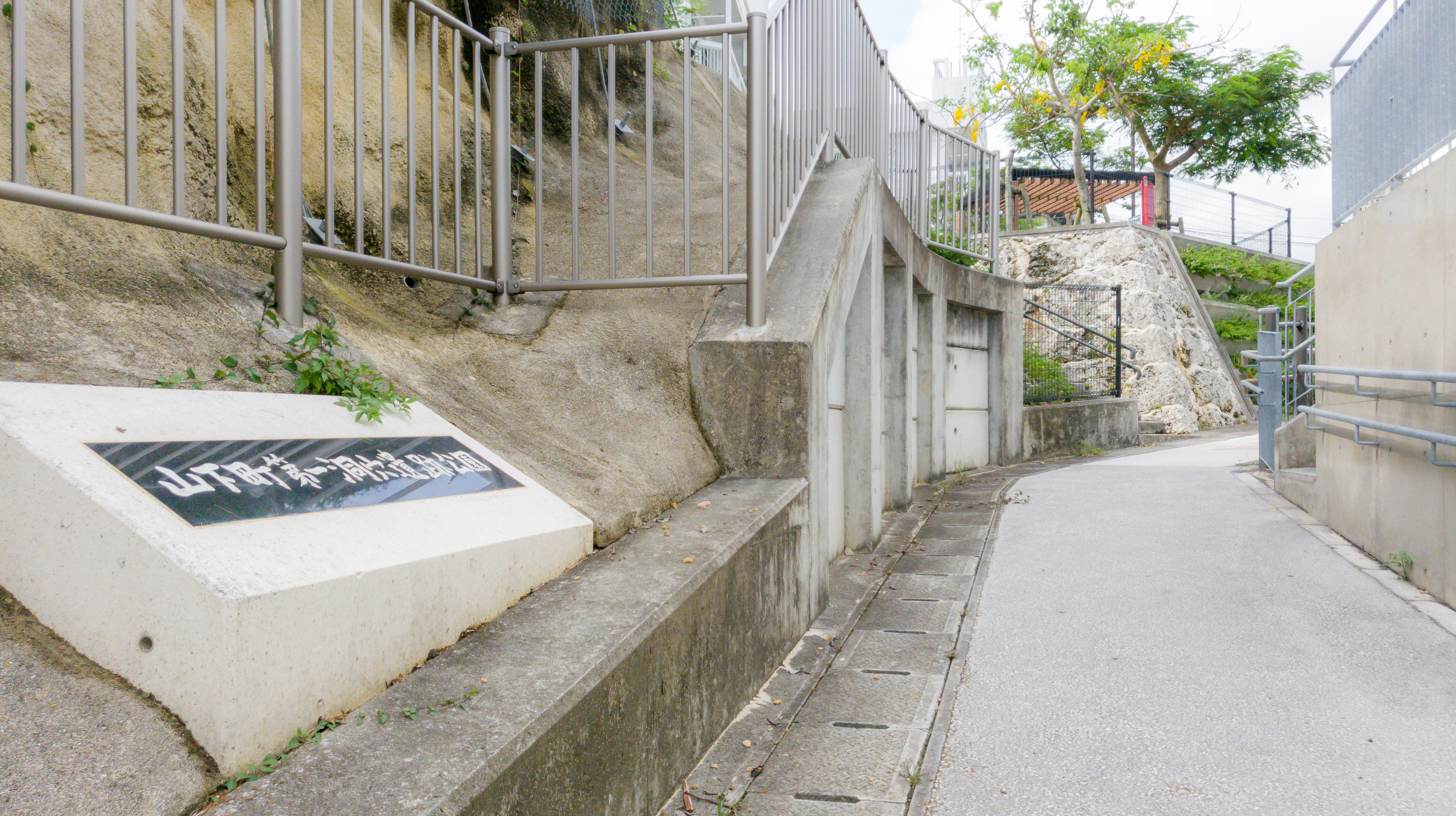
- Park entrance
- Interactive map of Yamashita First Cave Site Park
- Type: Urban park
- Location: Naha, Okinawa
- Coordinates: 26°12′03″N 127°40′22″E
- Area: 900 m^{2} (9,687.52 sq ft)
- Operator: Naha City
- Open: All year
- Parking: 2

Yamashita First Cave Site Park (山下洞穴遺跡公園, Yamashita Dōketsuiseki Kōen) is an urban park in Naha, Okinawa. The park was opened by the city in December 2015. An opening inauguration ceremony was held on January 8, 2016, in Yamashita Town, Naha. The 900 m^{2} (9,687.52 sq ft) park was created through private land purchases by the city which cost an estimated 100 million yen.

== History ==
Prior to becoming a park, Naha City Yamashita Cave 1, a prefectural historic site on Okinawa Island designated in 1969 and where Yamashita Cave Man was excavated, rested within what are now the boundaries of Yamashita First Cave Site Park. During the opening inauguration ceremony, Naha City Assembly member Toru Kinjo stated that it was rare for ruins to become a park.

== Features ==
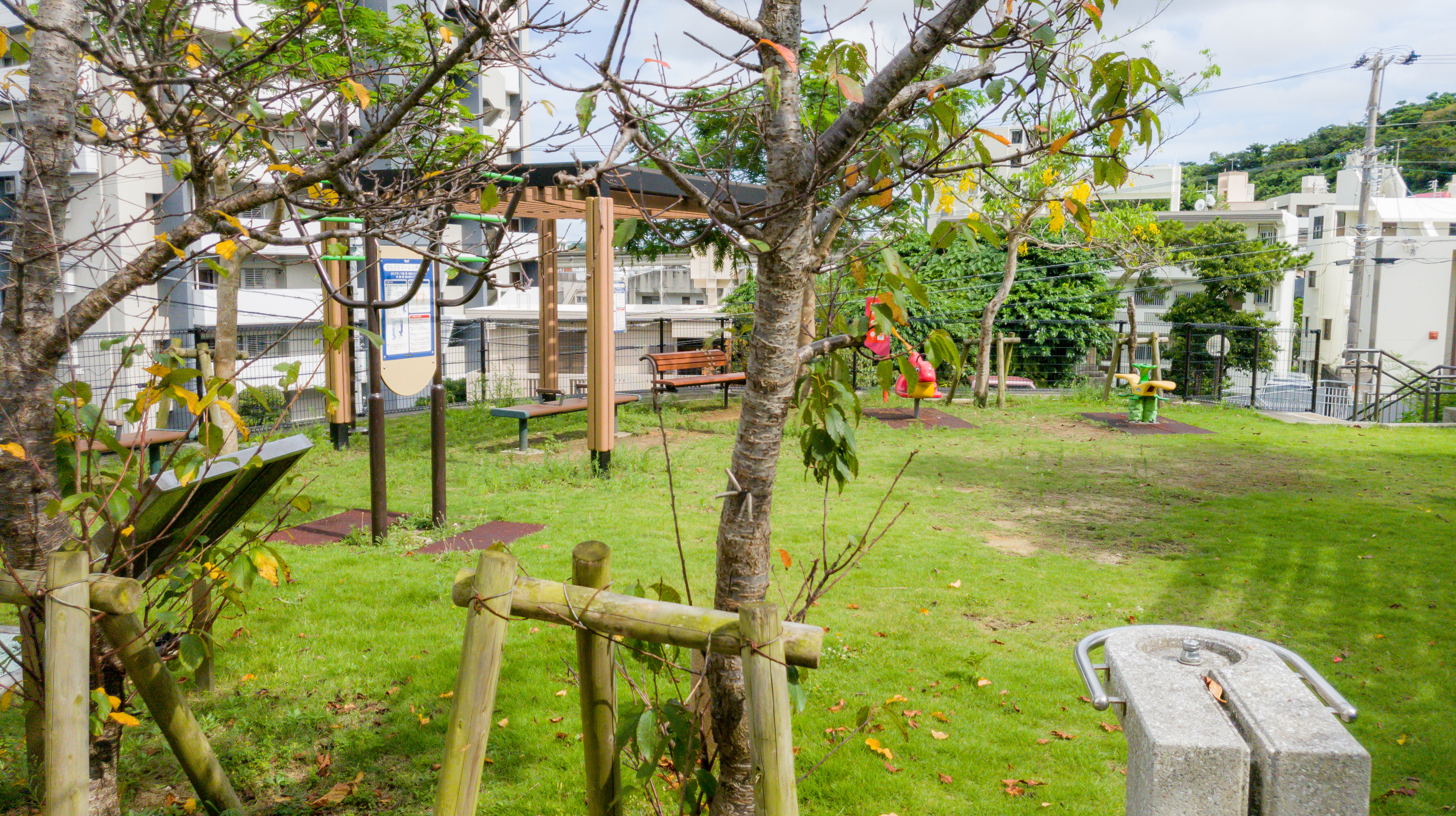
Playground and exercise equipment.

=== Historic landmark ===
The oldest fragmentary human remains in Okinawa Prefecture were discovered to be the Yamashita Cave Man found inside Naha City Yamashita Cave 1.

=== Facilities ===
Facilities in the park include playground equipment for toddlers and exercise equipment for adults as well as a covered bench. There are also restrooms on site for men, women, and people with disabilities.

== See also ==
- List of Historic Sites of Japan (Okinawa)
- Yamashita Cave Man
