= Nakijin Chōyō =

Former Ryukyuan lord of the Nakijin Castle

Nakijin Aji Chōyō (今帰仁 按司 朝容; 1582 – 1609) was a Ryukyuan lord (Aji) of Nakijin Castle. He was also known by his Chinese style name, Shō Kokushi (向 克祉).

Nakijin Chōyō was the second son of Nakijin Chōton (今帰仁 朝敦). After his elder brother Nakijin Chōkō (今帰仁 朝效) died without heir, he succeeded Warden of Hokuzan (北山監守, Hokuzan Kanshu) in 1596.

In the spring of 1609, Satsuma invaded Ryukyu. Satsuma troops landed in Kōri-jima (古宇利島) and Unten Port (運天港), then attacked Nakijin Castle. Soon the castle was captured, and Nakijin Chōyō was killed in the battle.

Political offices
Preceded by Nakijin Chōkō	Warden of Hokuzan; 1596–1609	Succeeded by Nakijin Chōkei
