= Pinza-Abu Cave Man =

Hominin fossil

The Pinza-Abu Cave Man (ピンザアブ洞人, Pinza-Abu Dōjin) is a prehistoric people known from bones found in the Pinza-Abu Cave, near Ueno in Miyako Island, southern Japan. The remains appear to have the modern man anatomical type and have been dated to about 30,000 years ago, i.e. 25,800 ± 900 and 26,800 ± 1,300 before present. The name "Pinza-Abu" literally means "goat cave" in the local Miyakoan language.

== Findings ==
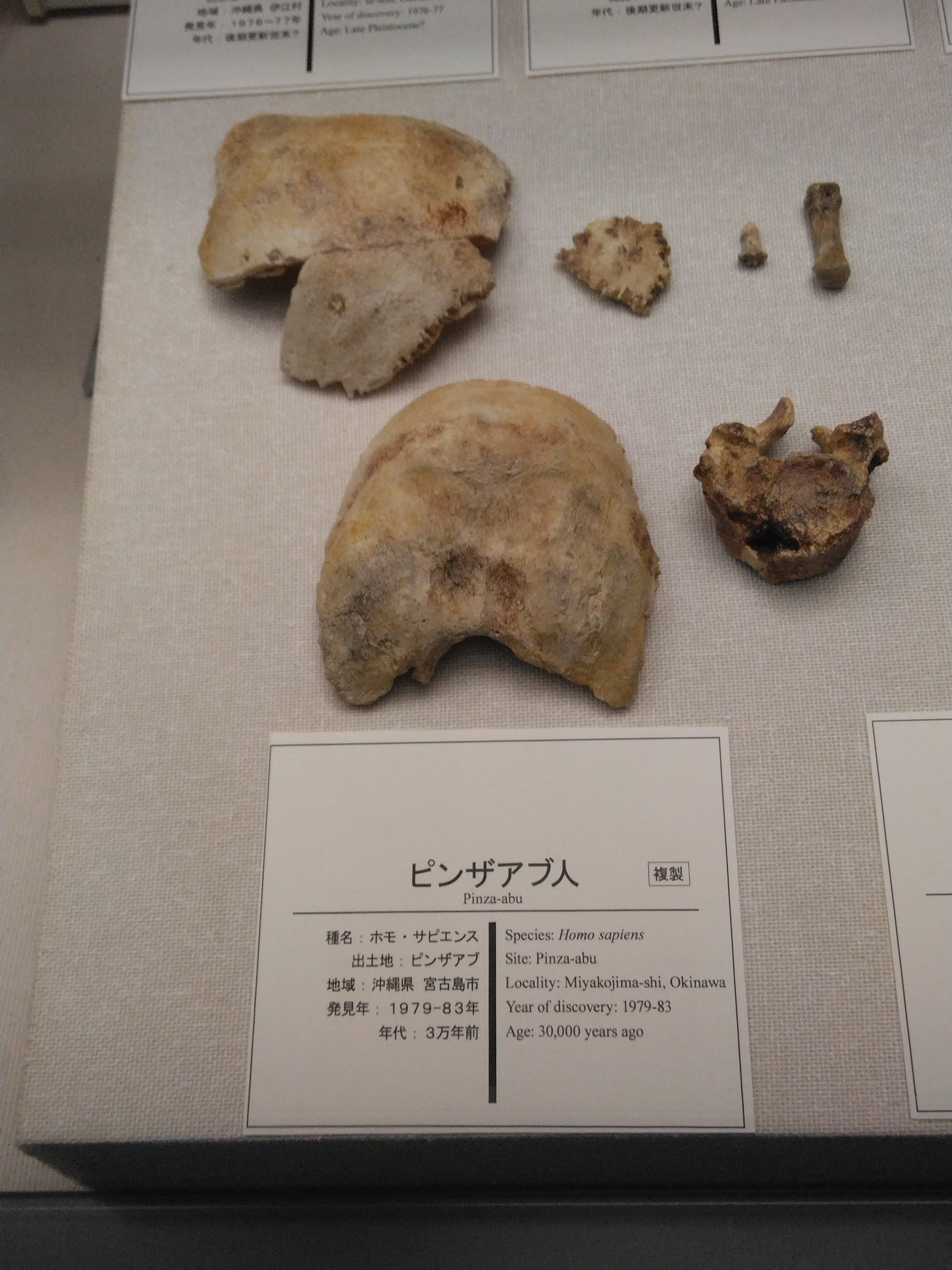
Pinza-Abu Cave Man remains

Between 1974 and 1989, expeditions and surveys were done on six occasions at the Pinza-Abu cave site. The bones found were measured and compared to recent Japanese and the Minatogawa Man. The occipital and supernumerary bones have been reconstructed from the few fragments found to create a nearly complete squama. The occipital squama has especially large features in the sagittal arcs, compared to that of modern Japanese. The right parietal bone has been found largely intact, with only minor fragments missing. Characteristics in the sagittal dimension, however, are much smaller compared to the modern Japanese. This small feature of the range of parietals is also seen in the Minatogawa skulls. The vertebra found was determined to be much smaller than recent Japanese vertebrae, but shared similarities with the Minatogawa Man.

As shown in the measurements, some of archaic physical features possessed by the Pinza-Abu Cave Man are shared by the Minatogawa Man, which may suggest close physical and biological between the two. Both groups of people have lived in the Ryukyu Islands, so they may have shared a close relationship, both from interacting with one another. This suggests they belonged in the same time and space. However, very little is still known about the origin of the Pinza-Abu people, in their migration and how they came to be isolated. According to some scholars, the Pinza-Abu Cave Man may have arrived to Miyako Island from the Malaysia during the Stone Age, due to physical similarities with the Wadjak Man. There are also speculations that the Pinza-Abu Cave Man is the descendant of the Java Man. From this, since the Java Man was already known to have produced fire, it can be thought that the Pinza-Abu Cave Man also possessed those skills. In 1989, surveys found charcoal with the human remains, which may reveal more about their lifestyle and technological advancements. There is still, however, no evidence that links the Pinza-Abu cave man as the ancestor of people living on Miyako Island today.

Along with human remains, the mammalian fauna found in soil deposits of the site, which may reveal more about the diet of the Pinza-Abu Cave Man. The dating technique used to determine the timeline from measuring the fluorine content of bones through an ion-selective electrode. Carbon-14 dating was also used in dating the bones. These techniques have determined the fauna to have come from around the time of the Late Pleistocene. In the oldest stratigraphic layer, deer bones were found and dated to 30,000 years BP. In the next layer, both deer and boar bones were found and dated between 15,000 and 20,000 years BP. The uppermost layer, which is also the more recent, only had boar bones. Today, these two species, along with several other mammalian species that have previously existed on Miyako Island, are now extinct there. The Pinza-Abu Cave Man was also discovered with stone tools, so they are thought to have already been adept with those skills. Miyako Island did not have large mammals, so much of the hunting is believed to be done individually or very small groups. This leads some researchers to believe that the Pinza-Abu people lived primarily in small, familial groups.

== See also ==
- Minatogawa Man
- Yamashita Cave Man
- Shiraho Saonetabaru Cave Ruins
- History of the Ryukyu Islands
