= Hanishi =

Hanishi 怕尼芝

King of Sanhoku
- Predecessor: unknown
- Successor: Min

Hanishi (怕尼芝, Okinawan:Haniši), read variously as Haneji and Haniji, was a local ruler of Okinawa Island, who was given the title of King of Sanhoku. Very little is known about him. He first appeared in Chinese diplomatic records in 1383 and his last contact was of 1390. After that, Min appeared in the diplomatic arena in 1395.

His real name is unknown. The name Hanishi appears to be a corrupt form of Haneji (羽地), a settlement in northern Okinawa (part of modern-day Nago City). The name suggests some connection to the settlement, but it is not confirmed by contemporary sources.

His appearance in diplomacy followed Satto's contact with a Chinese envoy from the newly established Ming dynasty in 1372. Satto was given the title of King of Chūzan. In 1382, another Chinese envoy visited Okinawa and returned to China in the next year. According to an article of 1383 in the Chinese Veritable Records of the Ming, the envoy learned that there were three "kings" who were at war with each other. Accordingly, the Ming emperor issued an edict to the King of Sannan and the King of Sanhoku to end the conflict. In response, Hanishi, King of Sanhoku, sent a tributary mission to China for the first time in 1383.

Five tributary missions were sent under Hanishi's name. Historians question whether he really took the initiative in these missions. While the kings of Chūzan and Sannan were given ocean-going vessels by the Ming emperor, the King of Sanhoku had no such record. Historian Dana Masayuki notes that the tributary missions under the name of the King of Sanhoku arrived at China nearly simultaneously with those under the name of the King of Chūzan, suggesting that the two groups coordinated with each other. Just like the kings of Chūzan and Sannan, the King of Sanhoku sent horses and sulfur to China. Sulfur was only mined on Iōtorishima, located further north of Okinawa Island. The reason why all the three kings, who were supposedly at war, had access to sulfur remains a mystery.

Okinawans later identified the King of Sanhoku as the Aji (local ruler) of Nakijin but had no information on how many rulers had assumed the title. The name of Hanishi itself was not transmitted among the Okinawan society and was later borrowed from Chinese records.

== Notes ==
Preceded by unknown	King of Sanhoku	Succeeded by Min
