= Sashiki Castle =

Castle/fortification in Okinawa

Sashiki Castle 佐敷城
- Nanjō, Okinawa
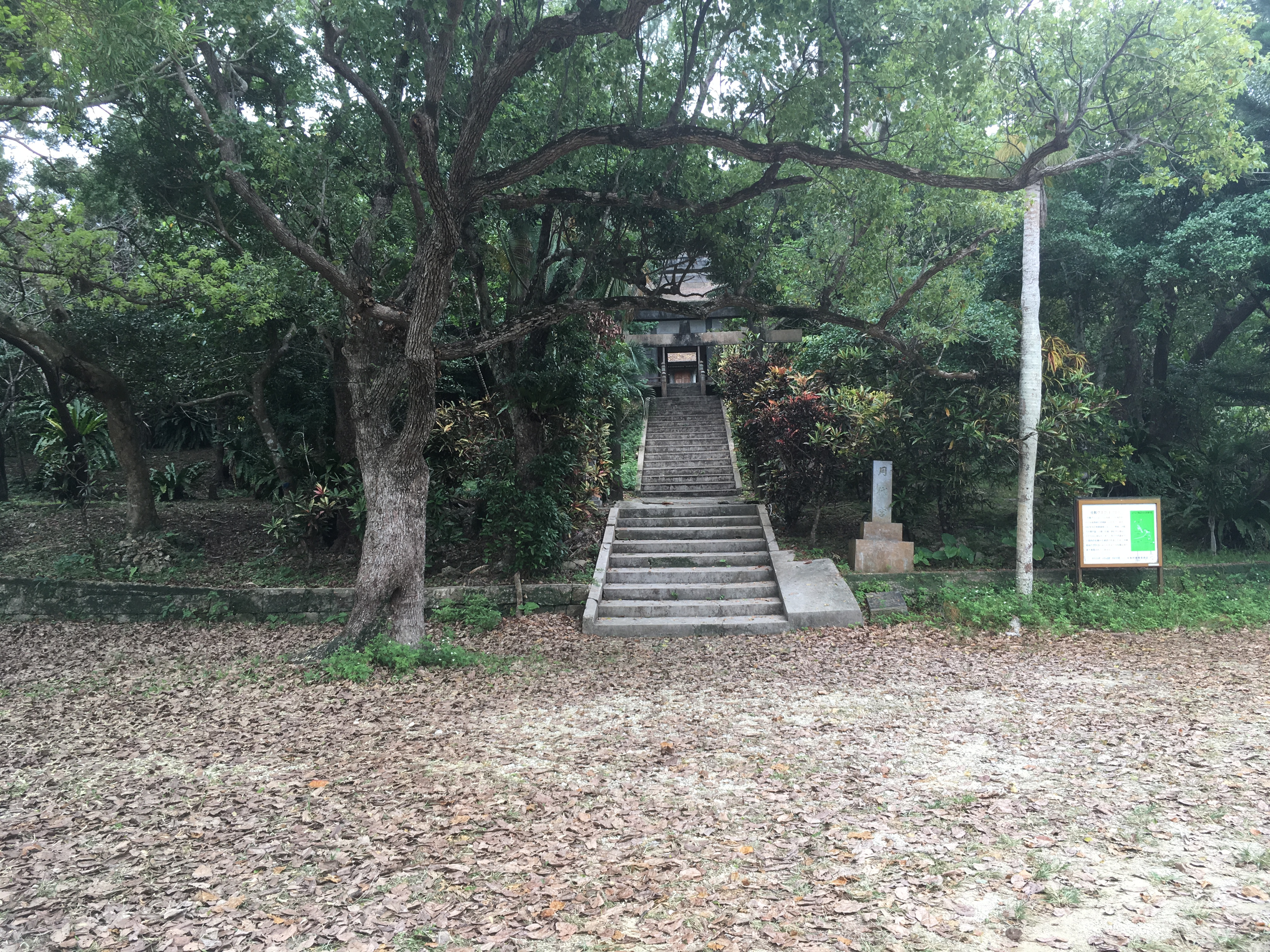
- Tsukishiro Shrine built on the site of Sashiki Castle

Site information
- Type: Gusuku
- Open to the public: yes
- Condition: Ruins

Location
- Sashiki Castle
- Location within Okinawa Prefecture Location within Japan
- Coordinates: 26°9′44.8″N 127°47′22.3″E

Site history
- Built: late-14th century
- Built by: Shō Shishō
- Materials: Ryukyuan limestone, wood

Garrison information
- Occupants: Shō Shishō, Shō Hashi, Aji of Sashiki Magiri
- National Historic Site of Japan

Sashiki Castle (佐敷城, Sashiki jō; Okinawan: Sashichi Gushiku) is a Ryūkyūan gusuku fortification located in the city of Nanjō, Okinawa. It has been protected by the central government as a National Historic Site since 2013.

== Overview ==
Sashiki Castle was built by King Shō Shishō and served as his residence and as the residence of King Shō Hashi of the First Shō Dynasty, and subsequently by Aji of Sashiki Magiri.

Unlike most gusuku, it was not surrounded by high stone walls and had more of a residential character. Nearby were the ports of Maten and Yonabaru, and Shō Hashi won the support of the people by distributing agricultural tools made from iron purchased from foreign ships calling at Yonabaru Port, thereby successfully unifying the three kingdoms of Okinawa. In 1938, Tsukishiro Shrine, a Shinto shrine named after the "Tsukishiro," the guardian deity of the First Shō Dynasty, was built on the site of the main hall to enshrine the royal lineage of the First Shō Dynasty. An observation deck and outdoor stage are also located on the site. In 1979, an archaeological excavation was conducted by the Sashiki Town Board of Education, uncovering numerous pillar holes on a three-tiered flat area. Artifacts were mostly found around the edges of the flat area, including a group of Chinese celadon bowls. Other finds also included iron and bronze artifacts, and Song dynasty, jade, carbonized rice, wheat, and cow bones.

== See also ==
- List of Historic Sites of Japan (Okinawa)
