= Nakijin Castle =

- 今帰仁城
- Nakijin, Okinawa in Japan
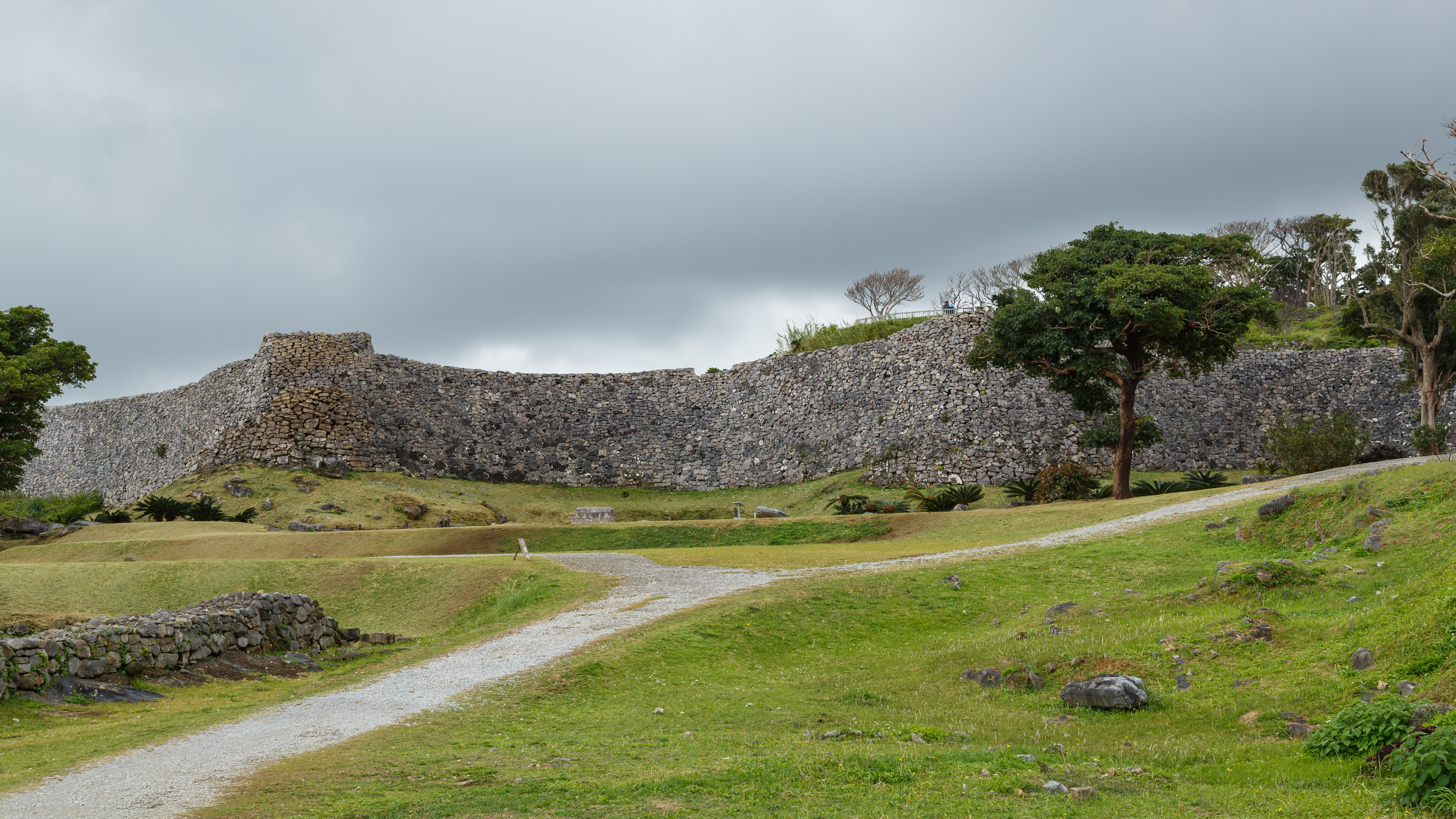

Site information
- Type: Gusuku
- Open to the public: Yes
- Condition: Ruins
- Website: www.nakijinjoseki-osi.jp

Location
- Nakijin Castle
- Location within Okinawa Prefecture Location within Japan
- Coordinates: 26°41′27″N 127°55′49″E

Site history
- Built: early 14th century
- Built by: Haniji
- In use: 14th century – 1609
- Materials: Ryukyuan limestone, wood
- Battles/wars: Invasion of Hokuzan (1416); Invasion of Ryukyu (1609)

Garrison information
- Past commanders: Shō Kokushi
- Occupants: Kings of Hokuzan, Wardens of Hokuzan, Aji of Nakijin Magiri

UNESCO World Heritage Site
- Criteria: Cultural: ii, iii, vi
- Reference: 972
- Inscription: 2000 (24th Session)
- National Historic Site of Japan

Nakijin Castle (今帰仁城, Nakijin Gusuku; Kunigami: Nachijin Gushiiku, Okinawan: Nachijin Gushiku) was a Ryūkyūan gusuku fortification located in the village of Nakijin, Okinawa Prefecture, Japan. It was also known as Hokuzan Castle or Hokuzangusuku. It has been protected by the central government as a National Historic Site since 1972. In November 2000, it was registered as a UNESCO World Heritage Site as part of the Gusuku Sites and Related Properties of the Kingdom of Ryukyu, along with the Shuri Castle ruins and others.In the late 14th century, the island of Okinawa consisted of three principalities: Nanzan to the south, Chūzan in the central area, and Hokuzan in the north. Nakijin was the capital of Hokuzan and Nakijin Castle was the seat of the King of Hokuzan. It is today known for the Hikan cherries which bloom in northern Okinawa between mid-January and early February, providing the first cherry blossoms each year in Japan.

== History ==
'Nakijin Castle is located on the Motobu Peninsula, on a rocky outcropping, facing out over the East China Sea. The castle is separated from the main mountain mass of Motobu on the east by a steep drop into a gorge with a stream at the bottom. A steep drop to the north and northeast from the castle drops down to the shoreline. A small harbor inlet here once served the castle, while Unten harbor, the main port of the Hokuzan kingdom, lay roughly 5 to 6 miles to the east.

The origins of the castle are uncertain. According to local legend, Nakijin Seshu built the castle, but this was long before the legendary Shunten dynasty. It is also said that the Seshu were all wiped out by the Toshiyu Rebellion. The fortress includes several sacred Utaki groves, reflecting the castle's role as a center of the Ryukyuan religion, which predates the construction of fortifications. Though there had been Lords of Nakijin prior to the creation of the Hokuzan kingdom, and thus some form of chiefly residence can be presumed to have been on or near the site before, it is believed that the gusuku form of Nakijin castle only emerged at the founding of the kingdom. According to the Chūzan Seikan and Chūzan Seifu, the castle was ruled by Daishun, the elder brother (or half-brother) of the legendary king Shunten, and his son. Later, the son of Shunten's second son, Shunbajunki, the Nakijin no Oshi, became the castle's lord. It is said that the second son of King Eiso, Prince Wakukawa, was adopted by the second generation (name unknown) of the Nakijin no Oshi of this generation and succeeded him as lord of Nakijin Castle. Prince Wakukawa and his descendants continued to rule the castle for generations, but were killed by his descendant, Hanishi, and the previous castle lord's lineage was destroyed and dispersed (one of his descendants was Gosamaru). This marked the beginning of the Hokuzan Kingdom. The era before Hanishi is known only from biographies and genealogies, so the dates are legendary. Physical evidence indicate that castle ruins date to the 12th or 13th century. The Ming Dynasty's "Ming Taizu Annals," written by Emperor Hongwu, contains a record of the tribute of the Hokuzan Kingdom and Nakijin Castle and is the oldest surviving documentary mention of the castle.

The fortifications measure 350 meters north-to-south and 800 meters east-to-west. The royal residence was located at the highest and innermost part of the complex and was surrounded by a small garden with a spring. Three shrines (uganju) stood at the highest point of the precipice. In a less inner enclosures, located at a somewhat lower elevations, were residences for certain vassals, along with administrative buildings, stables for the horses, and garrisons for the warriors of the principality. As was typical of gusuku construction at this time, the stonework of the walls was very solid, but quite rough, with a relative lack of precision fitting or fine cutting. Roughly 1500 meters of limestone castle wall remain today. Numerous ceramics from China and Southeast Asia have been excavated from Nakijin Castle, suggesting its former prosperity. .

In 1416, the Hokuzan Kingdom was destroyed by King Shō Hashi of Chuzan, and the Hokuzan Kanshu was established thereafter. Lords of Hokuzan governing in subordination to the royal capital at Shuri would continue to make their residence here for several centuries afterwards. In 1609, the Japanese Satsuma Domain invaded the Ryūkyū Kingdom. After fierce fighting in the Amami Islands, Satsuma forces landed on Okinawa Island at Unten harbor. They attacked Nakijin Castle with heavy casualties on both sides, but the Japanese prevailed and burned the castle. It has remained in ruins since.

As a tourist site, the ruins are particularly known for its view out over the East China Sea, for the impressive the castle walls, and for the overall amount of space taken up by the castle grounds. Nakijin is also consistently among the first places in the country to see, and celebrate, the blooming of the cherry blossoms (sakura) each year.

On April 6, 2006, the Nakijin Castle Ruins were selected as one of Japan's 100 Most Famous Castles.

The National Historic Site designation also covers the Shiina Castle Ruins (シイナ城跡), located in Misayahara, Gogayama, Nakijin Village, six kilometers southeast of Nakijin Castle Ruins. Built in the 13th century, it was abandoned shortly thereafter. Remains of the stone walls can be seen. Tradition has it that Shiina Castle served as Hokuzan's central base before construction of . However, due to a lack of water, the seat of the kingdom moved to Nakijin Castle.

== See also ==
- List of Historic Sites of Japan (Okinawa)

== Sources ==
- Motoo, Hinago (1986). Japanese Castles. Tokyo: Kodansha. p. 200 pages. ISBN 0-87011-766-1.
