= Iōtorishima =

Volcanic island in the Ryukyu Islands

Coordinates: 27°52′16″N 128°13′37″E

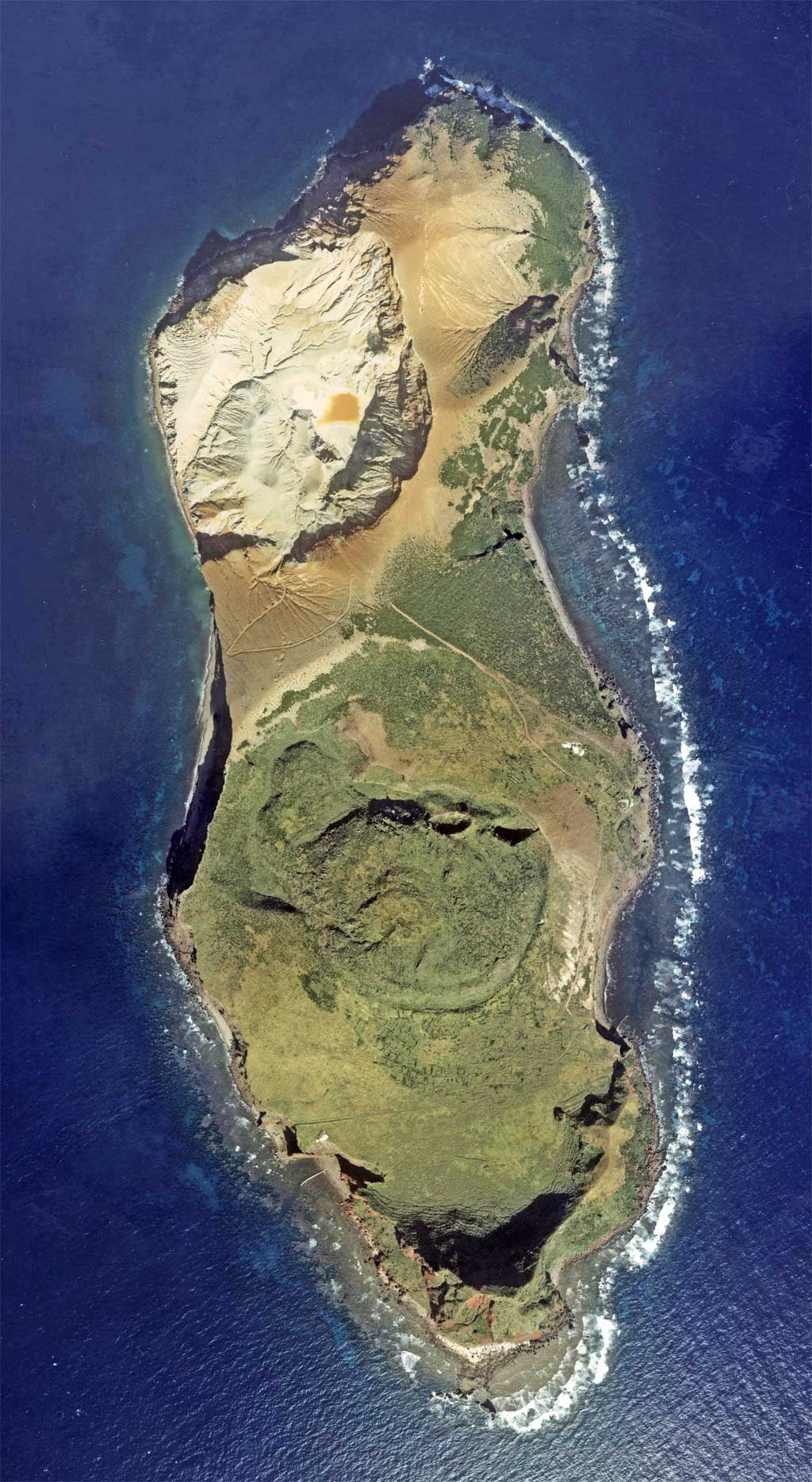
Aerial view of the Island.

Iōtorishima (Japanese: 硫黄鳥島; Okinawan: Tuisima, Yuō-Tuishima, lit. 'sulfur bird island'), also known as Iwo Tori-shima and Okinawa Torishima (沖縄鳥島), is a volcanic island part of the Ryūkyū Island chain with the only active volcano in Okinawa Prefecture.

== Geography ==
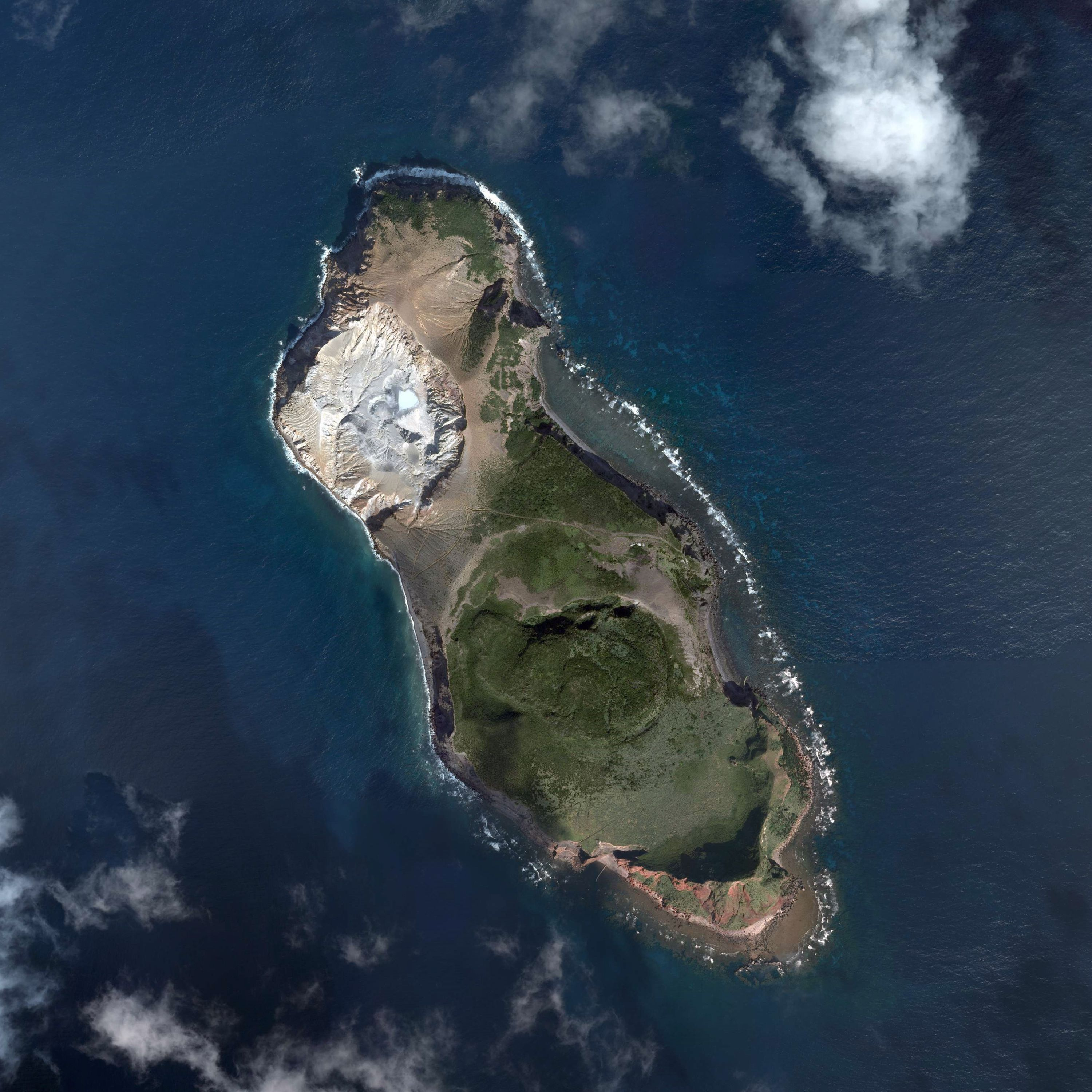

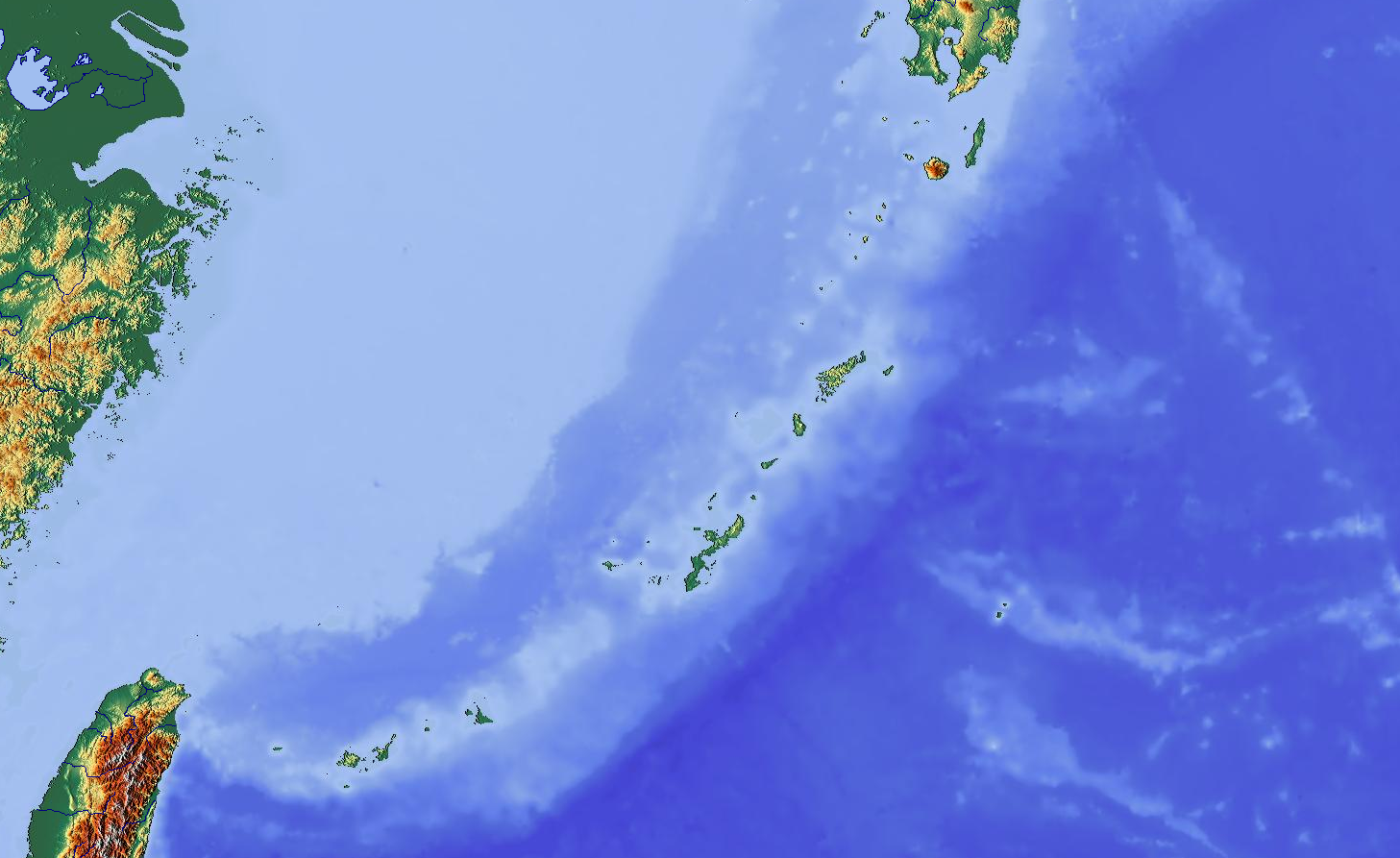
Iōtorishima (Ryukyu Islands)

Iotourishima is located 65 km west of Tokunoshima Island. On exceptionally clear days, Iōtorishima can be seen from the west coast of Tokunoshima.

The 2.50 km^{2} large island consists of two interconnected volcanoes made from andesite. The southern Gusuku kazan (グスク火山, "Castle Volcano") is a lava dome located in the center of the two summits. The northern Iōdake-kazan (硫黄岳火山, "Sulfur Peak Volcano") is a stratovolcano whose crater consists of a small lake of sulfur. It is still active, although none of the recent outbreaks had explosive character. The highest point of the island is at 212 m, which belongs to Iōdake-kazan; the highest of the Gusuku kazan is the Maedake (前嶽) at 189.3 m.

== History ==
Sulfur was mined by the inhabitants for centuries within the Kingdom of Ryukyu, and it was used as tribute to the Chinese Empire.

The first recorded eruption was in 1664, when a woman died from a landslide. In a series of eruptions and earthquakes from March to August 1903, all residents were temporarily moved 220 km to Kume Island, but were permanently relocated by June 1958; the final settlement had 86 inhabitants. Since then, the island has been uninhabited. In July 1968 there was another eruption.

Administratively, the island belonged to Gushikawa on Kume-jima, but merged in 2002 with Nakazato to the city Kumejima.

== See also ==
- List of islands in Japan
- List of volcanoes in Japan
