= Shō Hashi =

15th-century king of Ryukyu

Shō Hashi 尚巴志

King of Chūzan
- Reign: 1422–1439
- Predecessor: Shishō
- Successor: Shō Chū
- Born: 1372 possibly Sashiki, Higo Province, Japan
- Died: 1439 (aged 67–68); Okinawa
- Burial: Tenzan Ryō, Shuri
- Issue: Six or seven sons, (Note: Royal histories vary on Shō Taikyū's relation to Hashi. It is possible that the first Shō dynasty, including Hashi's alleged sons and grandsons, was not a family lineage, but a succession of powerful military leaders.) including: Shō Chū; Shō Kinpuku; Furi; Shō Taikyū
- Divine name: Japanese: 勢治高真物, romanized: Sejitaka-mamono
- House: First Shō dynasty
- Father: Shishō
- Mother: Daughter of Misato Shī

Shō Hashi (1372 – 1439) was a king of Chūzan, one of three tributary states to China on the western Pacific island of Okinawa. He is traditionally described as the unifier of Okinawa and the founder of the Ryukyu Kingdom. He was the son of the lord Shishō of the First Shō dynasty. Modern scholarship has connected Shishō's potential father, Samekawa, to a family of Southern Court-affiliated seafarers from the island of Kyushu, where Hashi was possibly born. Hashi became the lord of Sashiki Castle in southern Okinawa in 1392, becoming a noted military leader. In 1407, following a diplomatic incident between the Chūzan king Bunei and the Ming dynasty court, Shishō took the throne, attributed by the Ryukyuan official histories to a coup d'état by Hashi to install his father as king.

Hashi himself became king of Chūzan following Shishō's death. He continued tributary and trade relations with the Ming and embarked on military campaigns against the rival kingdoms of Sannan and Sanhoku. By 1430, he was the sole Ming tributary in Okinawa. He likely lacked territorial control over the island, limited to trade hegemony over the region within the Ming tribute system. He erected the earliest inscribed stele in Okinawa at Shuri Castle in 1427. He died in 1439 and was buried in a cave tomb near Shuri. His death began a period of rapid succession between his sons and grandsons, and eventually the kingship of Shō Taikyū.

== Biography ==
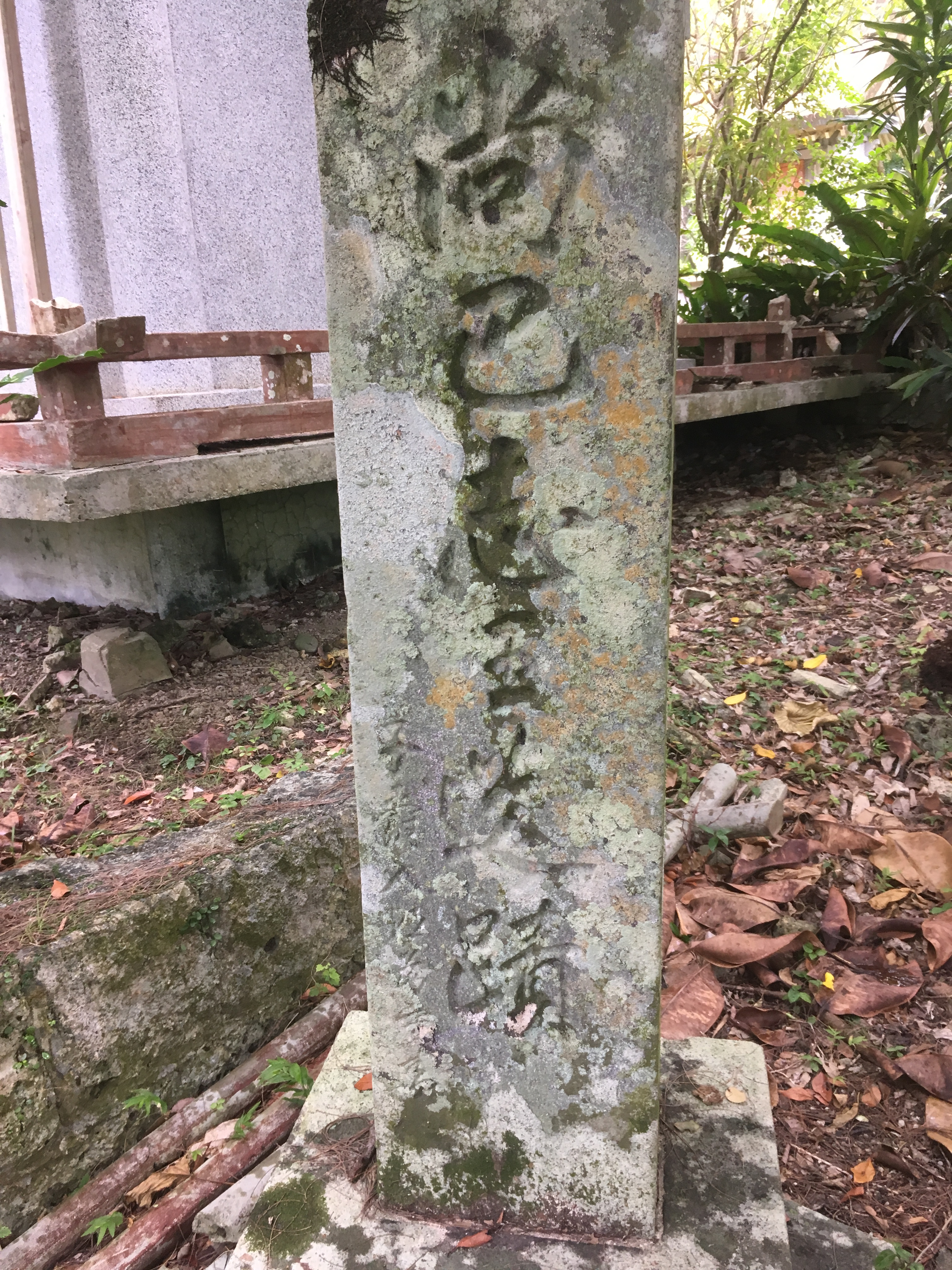
An early twentieth-century stele commemorating Hashi at his Sashiki Castle

The official histories of the Ryukyu Kingdom date Hashi's birth to 1372. Both the 1650 Chūzan Seikan and 1701 Chūzan Seifu list his father as Shishō, of unknown ancestry. However, the 1725 revision of the Chūzan Seifu states that Shishō was the son of lord Samekawa of Iheya Island, citing the Irosetsuden, a collection of Ryukyuan legends. Some modern scholars have argued that Samekawa and his family were initially Southern Court–affiliated seafarers (and possibly wokou pirates) from the island of Kyushu, in the vicinity of Yatsushiro and the harbor of Sashiki (now part of Ashikita), who migrated to the island of Okinawa during the waning years of the Nanboku-chō period in the late 14th century. If this theory and his traditional birth date of 1372 are correct, Hashi may have been born in or near Sashiki, Kyushu.

Hashi became the lord of Sashiki in southern Okinawa in 1392, ruling from Sashiki Castle. He became a noted military leader, with the 18th-century history Kyūyō stating that he drilled a cavalry force while ruling from Sashiki. In 1402, he conquered the gusuku (castle) of Shimasoe-Ōzato in a rebellion against its lord.

Bunei, the king of the Okinawan polity of Chūzan, was portrayed as an evil and decadent ruler by later histories. He had several men castrated and sent to serve as eunuchs in the court of the Yongle Emperor of China in 1406. The emperor reacted poorly to this; he ordered them returned and stated that it was intolerable that innocent men should be subjected to such treatment. The following year, Ming records reported that Shō Shishō, ostensibly Bunei's son, had sent an envoy announcing Bunei's death and requesting recognition as the king of Chūzan. The Ryukyuan official histories state that Hashi had led a rebellion against the tyrannical Bunei around this time, conquered Shuri Castle, and installed his father Shishō as king, beginning the First Shō dynasty. Shishō died in 1421, with Hashi succeeding him as king of Chūzan the following year.

=== Reign ===
The Chinese merchant-official Ō Mō served as kokusō (chief minister) for portions of the reigns of Shishō and Hashi, but due to his age petitioned the Ming court to return to China. During the latter period of Hashi's kingship (and the reigns of his successors), another Chinese merchant-official named Kaiki was appointed as chief minister. Kaiki oversaw the groundskeeping of Shuri castle and served as a Taoist minister to Hashi (advising him on Taoist longevity practices) as well as a diplomat to Chinese trade outposts in Southeast Asia. The Ming Veritable Records, the imperial annals of the Ming dynasty, note that these ministers were appointed by the Ming court to serve the kings of Chūzan. Historian Gregory Smits described the sudden rise in Ming influence following the overthrow of Bunei and the rise of the First Shō dynasty as a "Chinese-sponsored coup with Shō Hashi as the beneficiary".

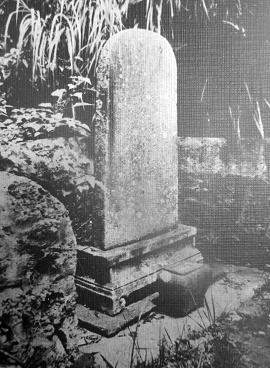
The Ankokuzan Jukaboku no Kihi (安国山樹華木之記), erected by Sho Hashi in 1427

The Chūzan Seikan details Shō Hashi's military campaigns. In response to an alleged scheme by the neighboring kingdom of Sanhoku (also known as Hokuzan) to conquer Shuri Castle, Hashi is said to have organized an army, appointing as his generals the aji (lords) of Urasoe castle, Goeku castle, and Yomitanzan castle. The army arrived at Nago Castle several days later and defeated the forces of Sanhoku. The second son of Shishō, potentially Hashi's brother, was installed as the governor of Sanhoku in 1422.

By 1430, Hashi had emerged as the sole tributary of the Ming in Okinawa. The official histories attribute this to Hashi's conquest of the rival trade kingdoms of Sannan and Sanhoku, resulting in the foundation of the Ryukyu Kingdom, although they differ on the order and specifics of Hashi's conquests. They claim that Hashi sent an envoy to the Ming court outlining his conquests and the unification of the island, but no record of such an envoy exists in Ming sources. During this visit, the Xuande Emperor is alleged to have titled Hashi the King of Ryukyu (琉球王; Liúqiú wáng) and bestowed him with the family name Shō (Chinese: 尚; Shàng). His father Shishō was posthumously given the name. Hashi's unification likely amounted to monopolization of connections with resident Chinese merchants, and unifying the loose confederations of nobles that comprised the three kingdoms of Okinawa. Rather than territorial states, the three kingdoms may have functioned as pure labels that various local nobles operated under to interface with the Ming tribute system.

The official histories portray Hashi as both a spiritually and militarily gifted ruler, embodying archetypal leadership qualities. At Sashiki Castle, he maintained a shrine to the deity Tsukishiro, a local form of the Japanese deity Hachiman brought to Okinawa by Samekawa. In 1427, Hashi erected the earliest inscribed stele extant in Okinawa (as well as the earliest Okinawan document in Classical Chinese), the Ankokuzan Jukaboku no Kihi (安国山樹華木之記), at the sacred grove of Sonohyan-utaki on the grounds of Shuri Castle. The text of the monument, likely authored by Kaiki, notes the planting of trees and flowers on a nearby hill, the political hegemony of Chūzan, and its tributary relations with the Ming empire. The stele serves as a terminus post quem for the construction of the castle. Walls were likely built around Shuri during Hashi's reign, and the area surrounding the structure gradually became a walled castle town. A large lacquered tablet bearing the name Chūzan, said to be a gift from the Ming court, was placed in a gate erected at Shuri Castle in 1428.

Hashi is traditionally credited with advancing agriculture and importing iron agricultural tools; however, no contemporary evidence of agricultural policies under his reign is known, and it is likely that the later official histories exaggerate the importance of agriculture during the period. Trade relations with Southeast Asia expanded under Hashi's reign, with many trading missions recorded to Siam and Java, alongside smaller amounts to Sumatra, Borneo, Luzon, and potentially Malacca. An Okinawan trading depot was established in the Chinese port of Quanzhou in 1439, creating a designated port of entry for trade goods and merchants.

=== Death and succession ===
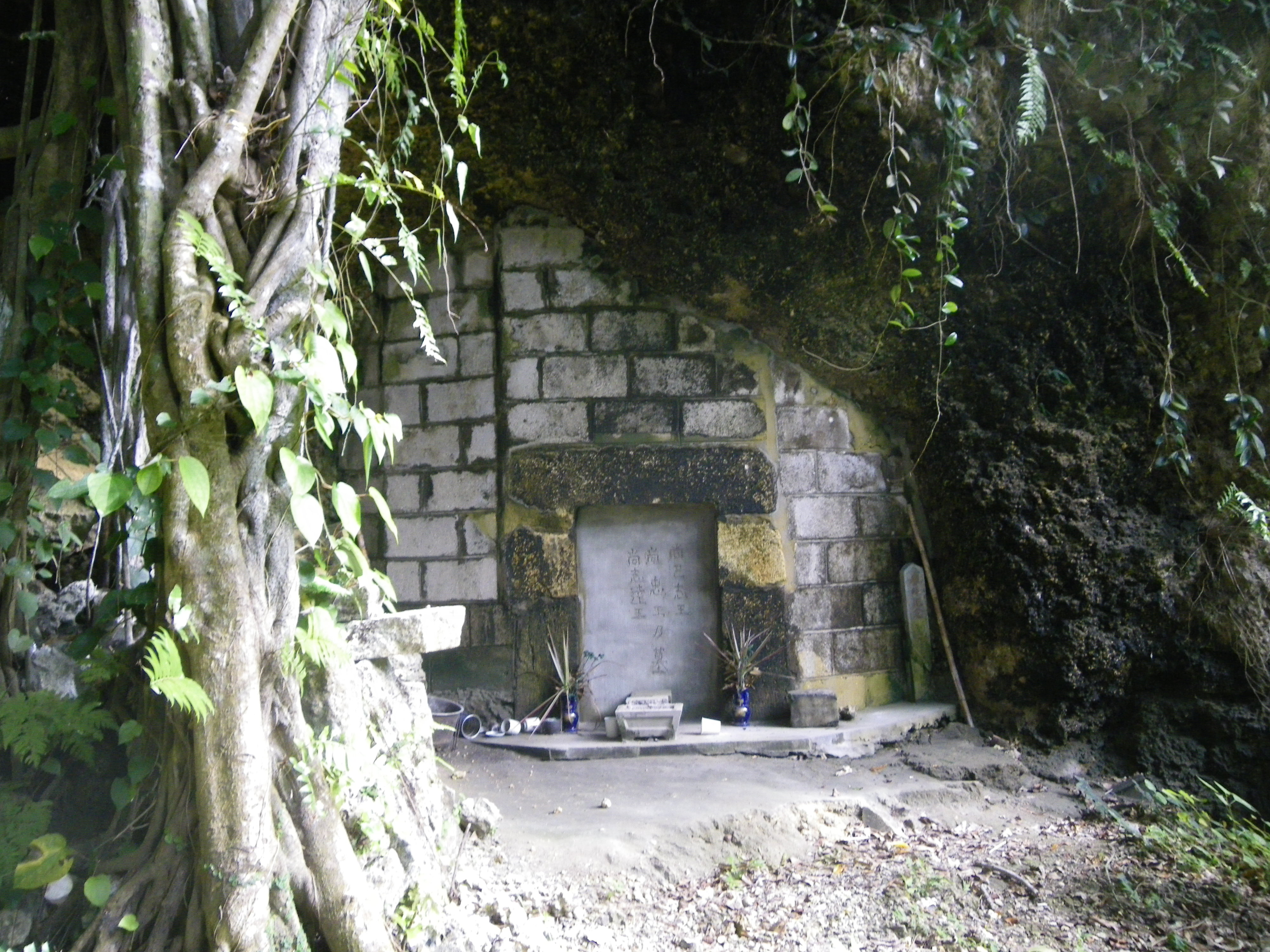
The site of the tomb attributed to Hashi, Shō Chu, and Shō Shitatsu

Shō Hashi died in 1439 and was buried near Shuri at Tenzan Ryō, a manmade cave tomb with a walled front. He was granted the divine name Sejitaka-mamono (勢治高真物). His successors Shō Chū and Shō Shitatsu were also interred at his tomb. The tomb and sarcophagus was destroyed during World War II during the Battle of Okinawa, leaving only the ornate stone platform, which remains in storage at Shuri.

Hashi's death began a rapid succession of rulers. Shō Chū, his second son, took the throne, but died in 1444. Chū's son, Shō Shitatsu, had a similarly short reign and died without heir in 1449. Hashi's fifth son, Shō Kinpuku took the throne before also dying four years later. A disputed succession between Kinpuku's son Shiro and Hashi's sixth son, Furi, erupted into the Shiro–Furi Rebellion, resulting in the destruction of Shuri Castle and the deaths of both claimants. The throne of Chūzan passed to Shō Taikyū. Royal genealogies alternatively describe him as a son of Kinpuku or the seventh son of Hashi, although he may have been unrelated to the other kings of the dynasty.

== Notes ==
Regnal titles
| Preceded by Shishō | King of Chūzan (or Ryukyu); 1422–1439 | Succeeded by Shō Chū |
