= Izena Tamaudun =

Royal mausoleum in Okinawa

- 伊是名玉陵; Ijina Tamaudun
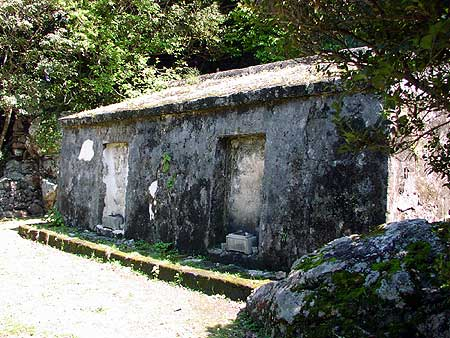
- Izena Tamaudun
- Interactive map of Izena Tamaudun
- Location: Izena, Okinawa
- Type: mausoleum
- Beginning date: 1501

Izena Tamaudun (Okinawan: 伊是名玉陵, イジナタマウドゥン, romanized: Ijina tamaudun) is one of the three royal mausoleums of the Ryukyu Kingdom, along with Tamaudun at Shuri Castle and Urasoe yōdore at Urasoe Castle. It is located near Izena Castle in Izena, Okinawa. It was built in 1501 by King Shō Shin.

== Burials ==
- Shō Shoku (d. 1434), father of Shō En
- Shō Zuiun (尚 瑞雲; unknown), mother of Shō En
- Ogiyaka (1445–1505), Queen consort of Shō En, Queen regent of Shō Shin
- Hiroshi Shō (1918–1996), 22nd head of the Shō family
- Ii Fumiko (井伊 文子; 1917–2004), daughter of Shō Shō, 19th Kikoe-ōgimi
