= Utuchitunumuigani =

Utuchitunumuigani 音智殿茂金
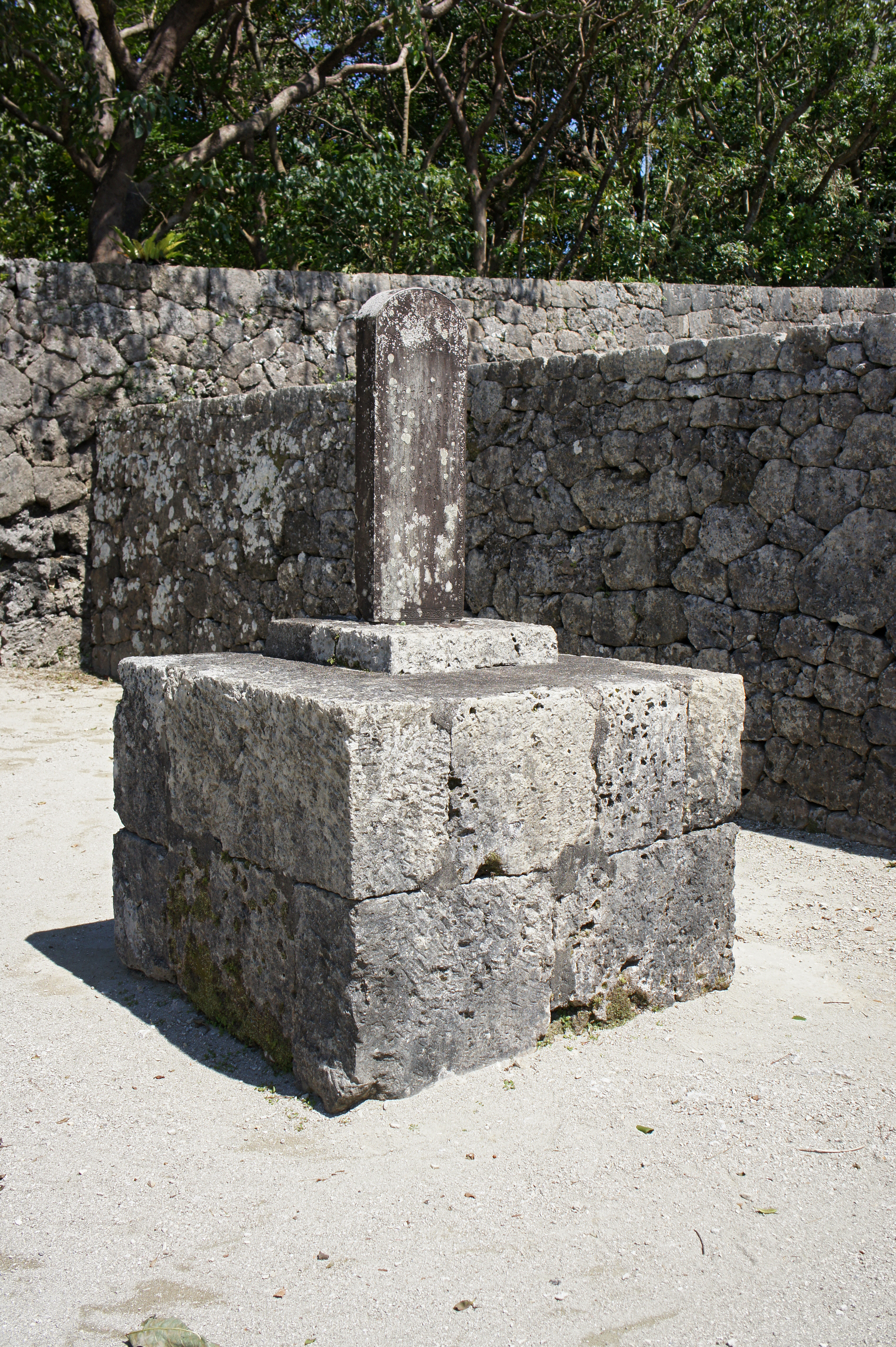
- "Otochitonomoikane" (おとちとのもいかね), as named in a 1501 stele [ja] from Tamaudun (third column from the right) (Prefectural Tangible Cultural Property)

Kikoe-ōgimi
- Reign: ? - ?
- Investiture: ?
- Predecessor: new title
- Successor: Minema Kikoe-ōgimi-ganashi
- Regent: Shō Shin
- Born: Unknown
- Died: Unknown; Shuri
- Burial: Tamaudun
- Warabinā: Utuchitunumuigani (音智殿茂金)
- Divine name: Gessei / Kiyora (月清)
- House: Shō (尚)
- Dynasty: Second Shō dynasty
- Father: Shō En
- Mother: Ogiyaka
- Religion: Ryukyuan religion

Utuchitunumuigani (Japanese: 音智殿茂金) or Otochitonomoigane (birth and death dates unknown) is the first Kikoe-ōgimi priestess of Ryūkyū Kingdom's second Shō dynasty.

Her divine name is 月清, transcribed as "Gessei" or "Tsukikiyora" depending on the sources.

== Early life ==
She was the daughter of the first king of the second Shō dynasty, Shō En, and queen Ogiyaka, as well as the sister of the third king of the dynasty, Shō Shin.

After the death of her father, while in charge of the ceremonies for the coronation of her uncle, Shō Sen'i, Shō En's brother, she announced that the gods were opposed to the succession and would rather have Shō Shin, Shō En's son, on the throne. Shō Sen'i abdicated in favour of his nephew.

Originally she was the onarigami (おなり神) (lit. "sister-goddess") of the king performing protective rites in the domestic sphere. Later she became, after the religious reform decided by her brother, the head of the hierarchic network of noro priestesses, who are in charge of the rites in the whole Ryūkyū Kingdom.

In 1500, she told Shō Shin that his military campaign against Yaeyama would be victorious only if he brought with him the noro of Kume Island. Her brother sailed with the priestess and his military campaign was a success.

Few documents mention her personal life with the exception of the role she played in her brother's coronation and the military campaign against Yaeyama. It seems she had no children.

She was buried in Tamaudun, the second Shō dynasty kings' mausoleum. She is mentioned on the dedicatory stele that was erected in 1501 and lists the persons authorized to be buried in the mausoleum, under the name Kikowe Ōkimi Anshi Otochitonomoikane (きこゑ大きみあんしおとちとのもいかね). Her spirit used to be sheltered in the Tenkai-ji temple, since it was the bodaiji for the spirits of all single princes and princesses of the second Shō dynasty. The temple was destroyed during WWII.

Religious titles
New title	Kikoe-ōgimi (1st)	Succeeded by Minema Kikoe-ōgimi-ganashi
