= Kikoe-ōgimi =

Highest ranking noro priestess of the Ryukyuan religion

Kikoe-ōgimi (聞得大君/きこゑ大きみ; Okinawan: Chifi-ufujin or Chifijin) is the title worn by the highest priestess of the Ryukyuan religion. Although the title is mentioned in sources dealing with periods older than the Ryūkyū Kingdom, the current characteristics of the function have been fixed during the great religious reform at the beginning of the second Shō dynasty.

Kikoe-ōgimi is the onarigami (おなり神) (the “sister-goddess” of the person with the highest status in the Ryūkyū Kingdom: the king. She protects by her spiritual power non only the king but also the whole kingdom. The function is assumed by a woman close to the king (sister, queen, daughter) or a member of a minor branch of the royal family.

Kikoe-ōgimi is at the top of the hierarchy of the noro priestesses of the whole kingdom and owns direct authority on them, although the king appoints them. She is responsible for the ceremonies held at the most sacred site of Okinawa Island, Sēfa Utaki as well as the ones given in the ten utakis inside Shuri Castle.

Kikoe-ōgimi is the incarnation of three deities who express themselves through her: "Shimasenko", "Akeshino" and "Tedashiro".

== History ==
=== Etymology and origins ===
Although the origin of the name is obscure, a theory is that kikoe (聞得; Okinawan: chifi) would be a laudative prefix meaning “the very famous” and kimi (君; Okinawan: jin) would mean “god”. The noros who take care of the rituals in the different villages of the kingdom are also called kimi (君; Okinawan: jin). The emphasis ōgimi (大君; Okinawan: ufujin), literally meaning “the great god” would be due to the high status of the person. The texts mentioning her use the term Chifi-ufujin-ganashi (聞得大君加那志), -ganashi being an honorific suffix.

The first mention of the name of "Kikoe-ōgimi" is found in the Nagahama Family genealogy, generally considered as the oldest conserved genealogy of the Ryūkyū Kingdom. It mentions a woman designed by the title of Kikoe-ōgimi, “venerable eldest daughter of King Eisō (r. 1260-1299), former king of Chūzan and King of Hokuzan”. Very little is known about the rites and the religion of this period of Ryūkyūan history, but it seems it was at first a title that was common to all priestesses who served as onarigami for a king.

=== The second Shō dynasty ===
==== Religious reform ====
King Shō Shin (r. 1477-1526) starts a political and religious reform including a centralisation of the political administration and a unification of the religion. It is during this reform that the hierarchical network of the noros is created in order to organise the many priestesses of the kingdom and that the kikoe-ōgimi priestess, until then the king’s onarigami who presided to the royal family’s religious ceremonies, is put at the head of this hierarchy.

Until then the most powerful priestesses of the kingdom had been the sasukasa (佐司笠/ 差笠; Okinawan: sashikasa) and the aoriyahe (阿応理屋恵/煽りやへ; Okinawan: ōrē) priestesses, who would then come second after the kikoe-ōgimi priestess.

On the dedicatory stele of Tamaudun, dated 1501, that lists the persons authorized to be buried in the mausoleum, Shō Shin’s sister is mentioned as Kikowe ookimi no anshi Otochitonomoikane (きこゑ大きみあんしおとちとのもいかね).

==== Characteristics of the function ====
Kikoe-ōgimi is first the protective divinity of the king: her prayers are made to bring him long life, health and prosperity. She also provides prosperity in the crops of the kingdom and safety for the sea travels. She takes part to many ceremonies, daily ones in her residence or in the castle of Shuri, but also pilgrimages in diverse sacred locations of the kingdom, that can occur one or twice a year, or less frequently.

Several divine names are attributed to Kikoe-ōgimi: "Shimasenko", "Akeshino" and "Tedashiro", who are the three deities expressing themselves through her. The divine name of "Shimasenko Akeshino" is also the one that was used by the very respected Jichaku Noro. The third divine name of "Tedashiro" (lit. "the sun’s spiritual receptacle") had been until then the one of Baten Noro, who gives it up for Kikoe-ōgimi. It might correspond to a wish to conserve the existing religious concepts into the newly created structure.

After her investiture, Kikoe-ōgimi receives the fief of Chinen Magiri and other lands in the kingdom, that corresponded to an annual revenue in taxes between 200 and 500 kokus.

In 1509, when king Shō Shin creates rules concerning the type of hair ornaments authorized for each nobility rank, the law mentions that Kikoe-ōgimi wears “a large golden jīfā with dragons and flowers”.

The Kyūyō states that in 1677, king Shō Tei decided that only queens could be promoted to the rank of kikoe-ōgimi, but this reform was never applied and the function was still given to daughters and sisters of kings afterwards.

In 1732, king Shō Kei appoints a surgeon who stays constantly at Kikoe-ōgimi’s residence in order to take care of the health of the members of her household.

==== The kikoe-ōgimis of the second Shō dynasty ====
Utuchitunumuigani (音智殿茂金), the sister of king Shō Shin, has been the first kikoe-ōgimi at the head of the new religious structure decided by the king. After the dead of Shō En, the first king of the second Shō dynasty, the power goes to his younger brother, Shō Sen'i, but Utuchitunumuigani, who already was kikoe-ōgimi as the daughter of the previous king, reveals that the gods are against this succession, and rather want Shō Shin, Shō En's son, on the throne. Shō Sen'i abdicates in favour of his nephew, showing how strong the political power of the ryūkyūan religion was.

Fifteen generations of kikoe-ōgimi follow until the fall of the kingdom in 1879. The Shō family is then sent in exile to Tōkyō. After the annexation of the kingdom by Japan, several local priestesses claim the title of kikoe-ōgimi, although the women of the Shō family exiled in Tōkyō go on with their religious duties.
In 1924, Princess Amuro manages to obtain authorisation to come, alone, to Okinawa, where she unofficially visits Sēfa Utaki for her investiture ceremony. The ceremony is shortened to one day, and none of the noros are allowed to assist her. This is the latest of the Kikoe-ōgimi’s investiture ceremonies.

At the beginning of the 2000s, due to the confusion created by the multiplication of self-proclaimed kikoe-ōgimis, Hiroshi Shō, then head of the Shō family still in exile in Tōkyō, appoints officially his sister Keiko Nozu (1947-2019) as the new Kikoe-ōgimi. He also appoints posthumously his aunt, Fumiko Ii, who had occupied the function before Keiko, until her death in 2004. Keiko Nozu is the first kikoe-ōgimi to regularly come back to Okinawa to perform the ceremonies there. The current kikoe-ōgimi is Maki Shō, daughter of Mamoru Shō, current head of the Shō family still in exile in Tōkyō.

==== List of the kikoe-ōgimis of the second Shō dynasty ====
Twenty-one women of the Shō family have succeeded one another in the function of Kikoe-ōgimi since the reign of Shō Shin.

Number	Divine name	Title	Warabi-naa or personal name	Birth	Death	Ascension	Notes
1	Gessei (月清)		Utuchitunumuigani (音智殿茂金)	?	?	during the reign of Shō Shin	daughter of Shō En, sister of Shō Shin
2	梅南	Minema-chifiufujin-ganashi (峯間聞得大君加那志)	Makadutaru (真加戸樽)	?	1577	during the reign of Shō Gen	daughter of Urasoe Chōman (ja:浦添朝満)
3	梅岳	Mawashi-chifiufujin-ganashi (真和志聞得大君加那志)		?	1605	1577	queen of Shō Gen, grand-daughter of Urasoe Uēkata
4	月嶺		Uminta (思武太)	1584	1653	1605	daughter of Shō Ei, wife of Prince Ufusato Chōchō (大里王子朝長) (Oroku Udun)
5	円心			1617	1677	1653	daughter of princeKin Chōtei (尚盛 金武 王子 朝貞, Shō Sei Kin Wōji Chōtei) (Kin Udun), wife of prince Kunigami Seisoku (馬国隆 国頭王子正則, Ba Kokuryū Kunigami Wōji Seisoku) (Kunigami Udun)
6	月心	Lord of Okuma (奥間按司加那志, Okuma Aji-ganashi)	Umimachirugani (思真鶴金)	1645	1703	1677	queen of Shō Tei, daughter of Ginowan Seishin (宜野湾親方正信, Ginowan Uēkata Seishin) (Sakuma Dunchi)
7	義雲		Umitugani (思戸金)	1664	1723	1703	wife of crown prince Shō Jun and mother of Shō Eki, daughter of Yuntanza Seiin (毛思義 読谷山親方盛員, Mō Shigi Yuntanza Uēkata Seiin)
8	坤宏		Umimachirugani (思真鶴金)	1680	1765	1723	queen of Shō Eki and mother of Shō Kei, daughter of Gushikawa Seishō (毛邦秀 具志川親方盛昌, Mō Hōshū Gushikawa Uēkata Seishō) (Inoha Dunchi)
9	仁室		Umikamitarugani (思亀樽金)	1705	1779	1766	queen of Shō Kei and mother of Shō Boku, daughter of Nakasato Ryōchoku (馬如飛 仲里親方良直, Ma Rufei Nakasato Uēkata Ryōchoku) (Oroku Dunchi)
10	寛室	Princess Tsukazan (津嘉山翁主, Tsukazan Ōshu)	Machirugani (真鶴金)	1719	1784	1780	daughter of Shō Kei, wife of Sai Yi (蔡翼 具志頭親方廷儀, Sai Yi Gushichan Uēkata Teigi) (Gushichan Dunchi)
11	順成	Princess Zukeran (瑞慶覧翁主, Zukeran Ōshu)	Umitugani (思戸金)	1721	1789	1784	daughter of Shō Kei, wife of Ie Chōki (向依仁 伊江王子朝倚, Shō Yiren Ie Wōji Chōki) (Ie Udun)
12	徳澤		Manabitarugani (真鍋樽金)	1762	1795	1789	queen of Shō Tetsu, daughter of Shō Bunryū (尚文龍 高嶺按司朝京, Shō Bunryū Takamine Aji Chōkyō)
13	法雲		Umikamitaru (思亀樽)	1765	1834	1789	Eldest daughter of Shō Boku, wife of Jana Chōboku (向克相 識名親方朝睦, Shō Kokushō Jana Uēkata Chōboku) (Jana Dunchi)
14	仙徳	Seigneur de Sashiki (佐敷按司加那志, Sashiki Aji-ganashi)	Umikamitaru (思亀樽)	1785	1869	1834	queen of Shō On, daughter of Kunigami Chōshin (國頭親方朝愼, Kunigami Uēkata Chōshin) (Urasoe Dunchi)
15		Princess Nakaima (仲井間翁主, Nakaima Ōshu)	Machirugani (真鶴金)	1817	?	1870	daughter of Shō Kō, wife of Tamagusuku Chōchoku (向崇德 玉城按司朝敕, Shō Sutoku Tamagusuku Aji Chōchoku) (Tamagusuku Udun)
16		Princess Asato (安里翁主, Asato Ōshu)	Mōshigani (真牛金)	1825	1909	Meiji Era	daughter of Shō Kō, wife of Ōgimi Chōhei (向氏大宜見按司朝平, Shō shi Ōgimi Aji Chōhei) (Ōgimi Udun)
17		Princess Amuro (安室翁主, Amuro Ōshu)	Manabitaru (真鍋樽)	1874	1944	Taishō Era	daughter of Shō Tai, wife of Ie Chōyu (伊江朝猷)
18			Nobuko Nakijin (今帰仁 延子, Nakijin Nobuko)	1887	1967	1944	daughter of Shō Ten, wife of Nakijin Chōei (今歸仁朝英) (Nakijin Udun)
19			Fumiko Ii (井伊文子, Ii Fumiko)	1917	2004	?	daughter of Shō Shō. essayist.
20			Keiko Nozu (野津 圭子, Nozu Keiko)	1947	2019	2013	daughter of Hiroshi Shō. Businesswoman
21			Maki Shō (尚 満喜, Shō Maki)	1984	alive	2019	adoptive daughter of Mamoru Shō. Shinto priestess

== Ceremonies ==
=== Investiture ===
The investiture of Kikoe-ōgimi is called uārauri (御新下) (lit. "the new descent"). The details are mainly known thanks to a report of the investiture ceremony of the fourteenth kikoe-ōgimi, queen of Shō On, the Journal of the uārauri of Kikoe-ōgimi-ganashi (聞得大君加那志 御新下日記]).

The preparations for the ceremony take about six months, including the renovation of the roads and the construction of several temporary residences on the way of the procession that take the future kikoe-ōgimi from Shuri to Sēfa Utaki. The wood for the residences is obtained from the northern forests and is prepared and transported according to the Kinjan sabakui (国頭サバクイ) ritual. Sand from the sacred island of Kudaka is transported to Sēfa Utaki and spread on the ground at the location of the ceremony.

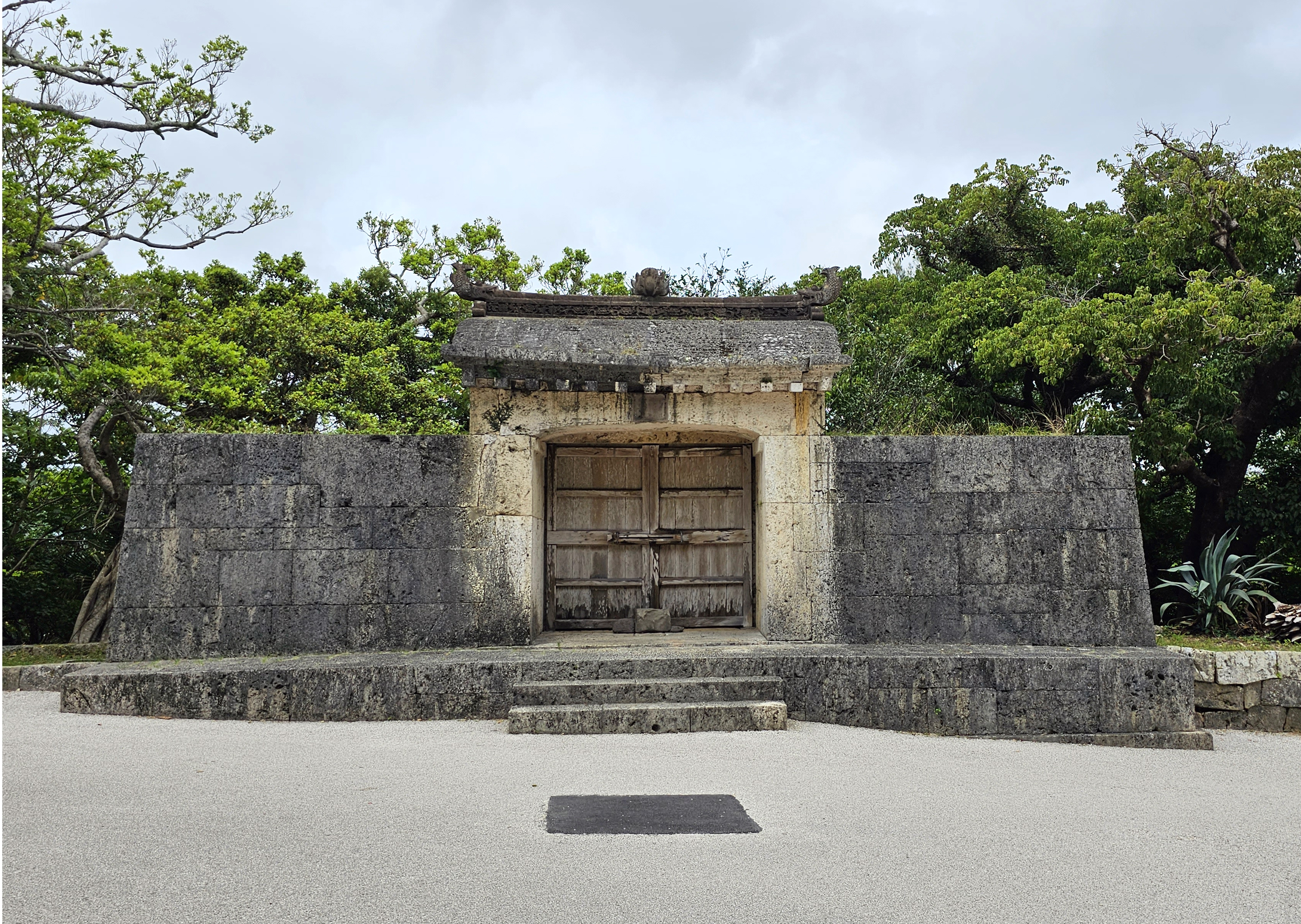
Sunuhyan Utaki.

The future kikoe-ōgimi leaves her residence with her followers early in the morning and goes to Shuri Castle. After several ceremonies inside Shuri Castle and in Sunuhyan-utaki (園比屋武御嶽), the future kikoe-ōgimi goes to Yonabaru, mounted on a white horse, surrounded by the songs (kuēna) of the noros and priestesses following her.

In Yonabaru, she is welcomed by Ufuzato-Haebaru Noro (大里南風原ノロ) and her followers, all wearing white clothes. The future kikoe-ōgimi goes to the Udun'yama sacred site where she receives the ubīnadi (御水撫でぃ) (her forehead is rubbed with sacred water), and then to the Uya-gā (親川) sacred spring where she purifies herself. The noros and the other priestesses sing and dance in front of the temporary residence that has been built for the investiture. In the afternoon, they leave Yonabaru, led by Ufuzato-Haebaru Noro and form a procession to go to Sēfa Utaki.

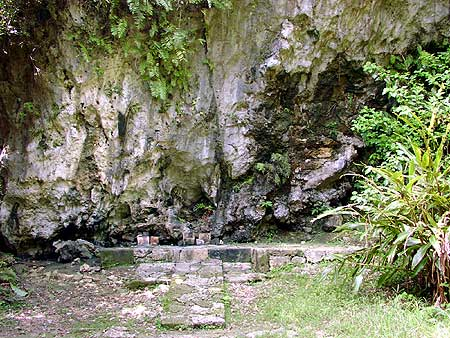
Ufu-gūi

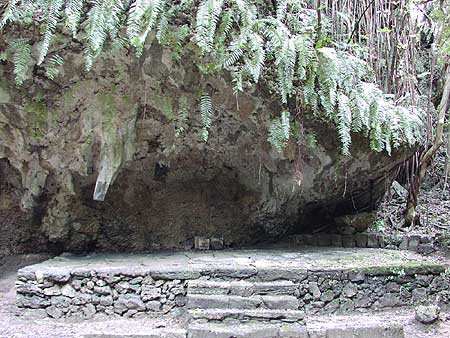
Yuinchi

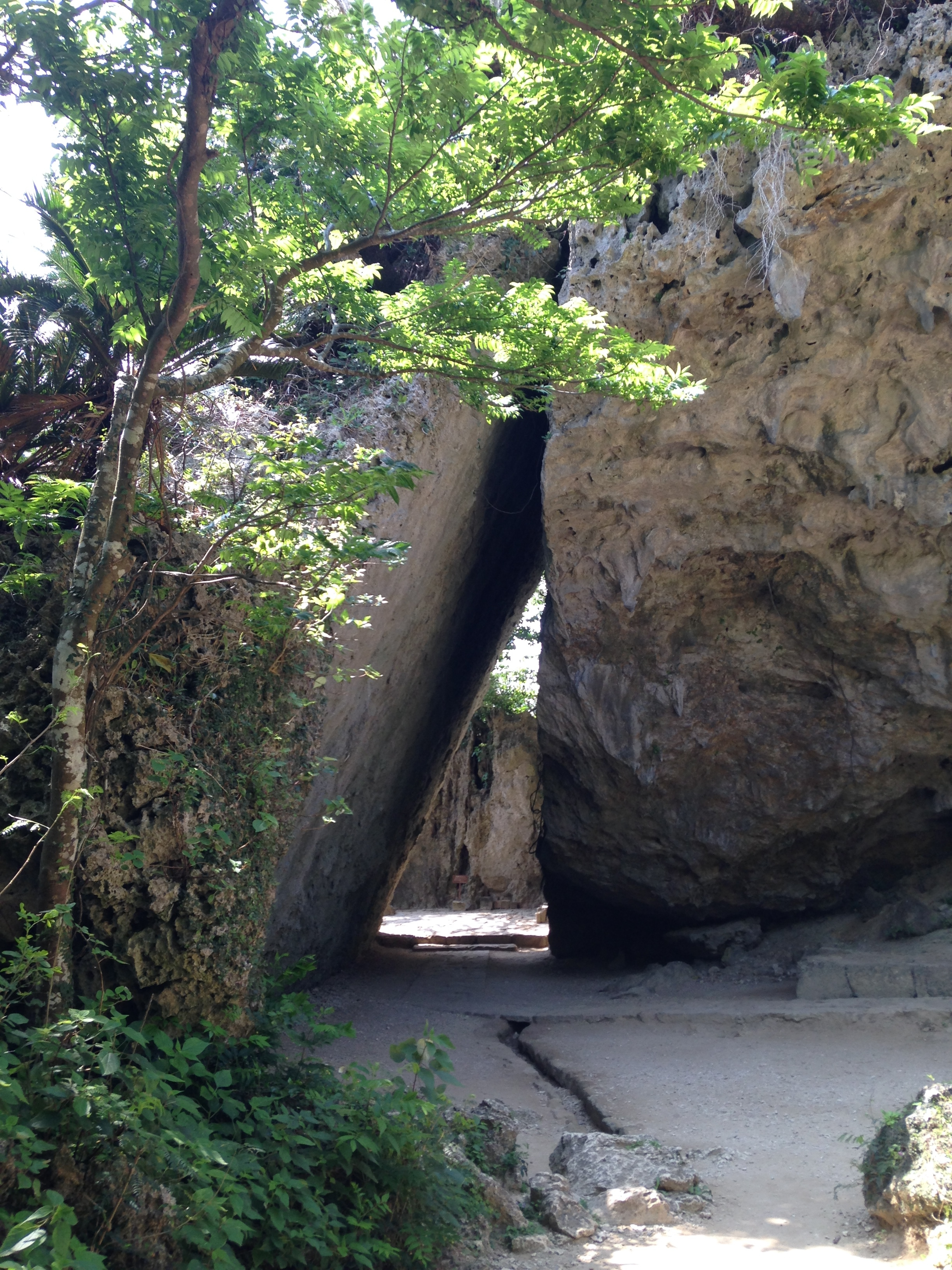
Sangūi

The Chinen-Tamagusuku Noro (知念玉城ノロ) and her followers welcome them at the boundary between the magiris of Sashiki and Chinen. The future kikoe-ōgimi demounts and climbs in a litter. The procession arrives to Sēfa Utaki in the evening. After a rest in the temporary residence that has been built in front of Sēfa Utaki, the ceremony takes place at night. The Kudakajima-Kudaka Noro (久高島久高ノロ) arrives in the night, on a white horse, and is welcomed by the Chinen-Tamagusuku Noro and her followers.

The processions counts about seventy noros and priestesses, who escort the future kikoe-ōgimi from the temporary residence to the Ufu-gūi (大庫裡) sacred site while singing. The procession visits the Yuinchi (寄満) and Sangūi (三庫裡) sacred sites before they go back to Ufu-gūi. The investiture ceremony itself is held at Ufu-gūi, it is presided by Kudakajima-Kudaka Noro, assisted of Chinen-Tamagusuku Noro. The future kikoe-ōgimi is seated on a throne and the noros sit in circke around her. The Kudakajima-Hokama Noro (久高島外間ノロ) set a crown on her head while the other priestesses sing and dance around. Before dawn, the future kikoe-ōgimi returns to the temporary residence, where a golden folding screen has been set, hiding a bed and a golden pillow. This is where the gods come down and incarnate themselves in her in a ritual of celestial wedding.

At dawn, all the noros and Kikoe-ōgimi welcome the sunrise. By noon, the procession visits Tamagusuku Gusuku (玉城グスク), Ukinju-hainju (受水走水) sacred springs and Minton Gusuku (ミントングスク), before they go back to Shuri in the evening. Once the uārauri ceremony is over, the new kikoe-ōgimi is considered equal to the gods. After this investiture, she will keep her function till her death.

=== Agari-umāi Pilgrimage ===
Kikoe-ōgimi, together with the king, made the Agari-umāi (東御廻) pilgrimage once a year during the fourth month of the lunar calendar, during which she visited fourteen sacred places in relation with the goddess Amamikiyo between Shuri Castle and Sēfa Utaki. She left Shuri after devotions at Sunuhyan-utaki (園比屋武御嶽) and visited the Udun'yama (御殿山) sacred site and the Uya-gā (親川) sacred spring in Yonabaru, as well as the Baten-utaki (場天御嶽) and Sashiki Uī-gusuku (佐敷上グスク) sacred sites in Sashiki, before she went to Chinen Magiri where she prayed at the Tida-ukkā (ティダ御川) sacred spring before she entered Sēfa Utaki. There, she held rituals in six different sacred locations (ibi), praying for the kingdom's prosperity and safety, for good crops and safe sea trips.

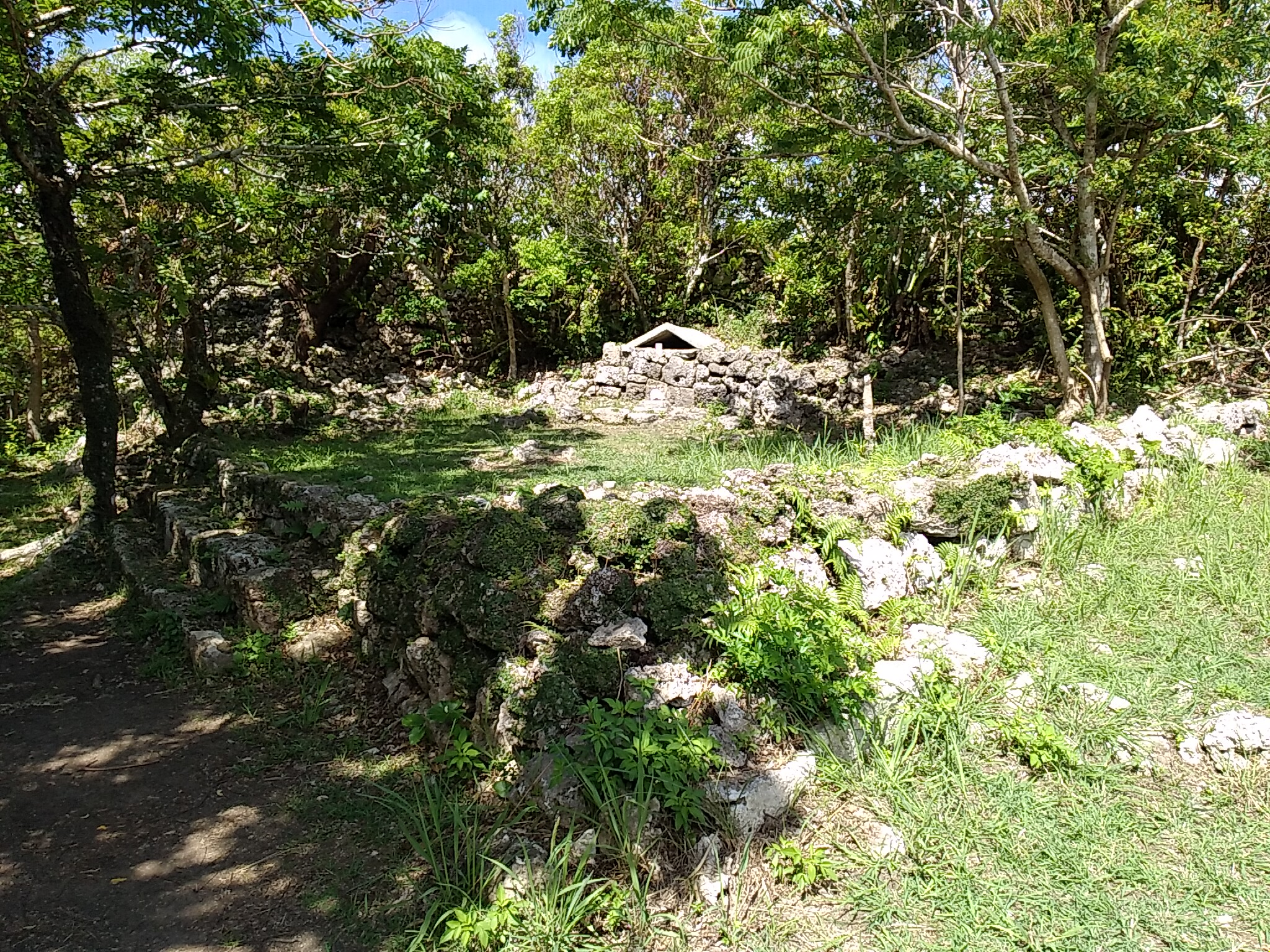
Amatsugiamatsugi Utaki in Tamagusuku Gusuku

After the ceremonies at Sēfa Utaki, she went to Chinen Gusuku (知念グスク), to the Chinen-ukkā (知念大川) sacred spring, to the Ukinju-hainju (受水走水) sacred sources, to Yaharazukasa (ヤハラヅカサ), to Hama-gā-utaki (浜川御嶽), to Minton Gusuku (ミントングスク) and finally to Tamagusuku Gusuku (玉城グスク).

=== Kudaka Island Pilgrimage ===
Kikoe-ōgimi went once every two years to the sacred island of Kudaka, during the second month of the lunar calendar. She was authorised to take sand from this sacred island to spread it on the ground of the other utakis of the kingdom. During those trips, a temporary residence was built in Udun'yama (御殿山) in Yonabaru and she took the sea there.

=== Ceremonies in Shuri Castle ===
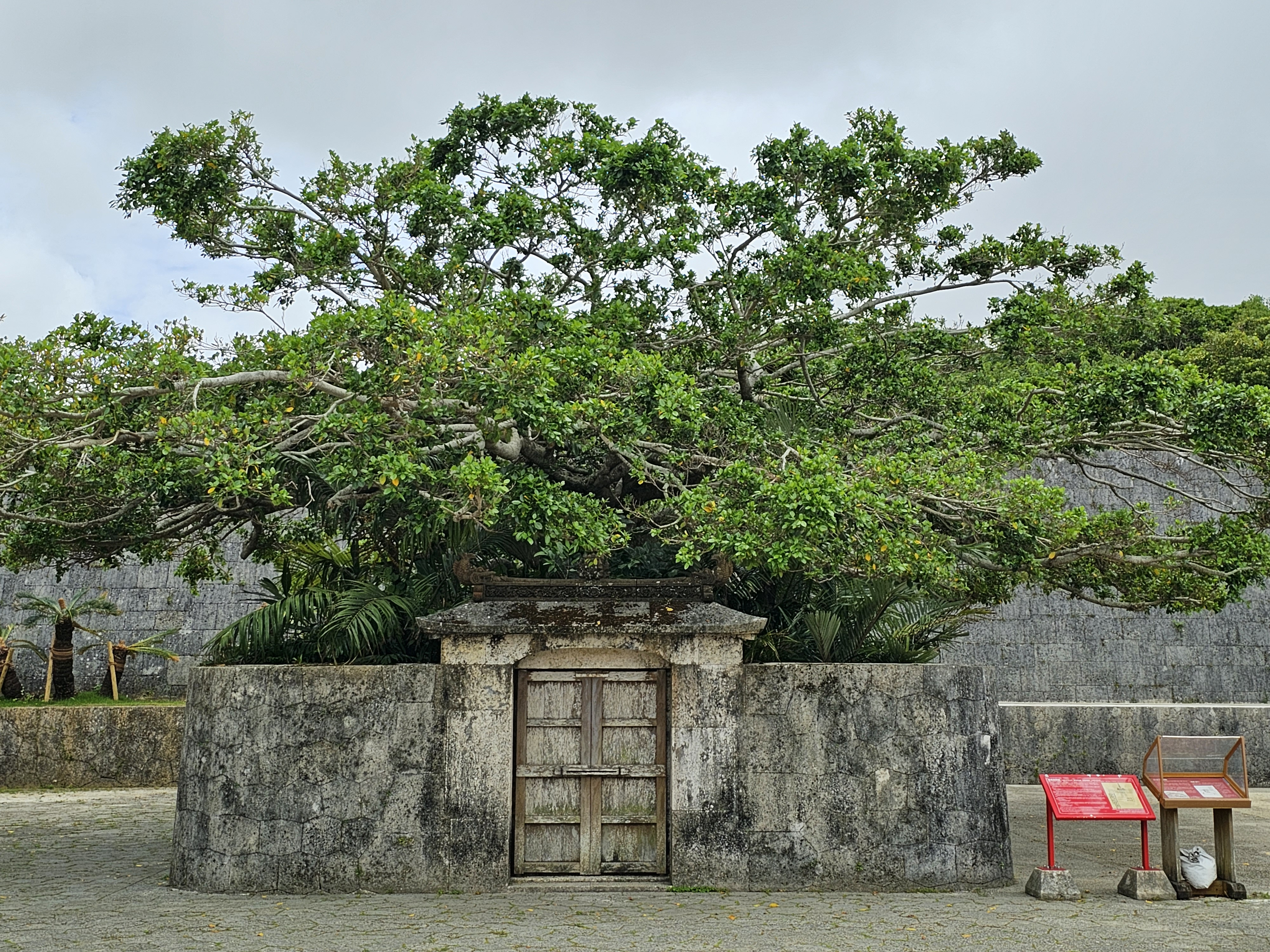
Shui-mui Utaki

There are ten utakis inside Shuri Castle, for which Kikoe-ōgimi was responsible: Akatauchiyau-nu-utaki (あかた御ぢやうの御嶽/赤田御門の御嶽), Mimonouchi(utaki (みもの内御嶽), an unnamed utaki located next to the Yosufichi-ujō (寄内御門) gate, Yosufichi-nu-utaki (寄内の御嶽), the four utakis of Kiyau-nu-uchi (京の内) (Madangusuku-nu-utaki (真玉城の御嶽) and three unnamed utakis) and Shui-mui-utaki (首里森御嶽). Rituals to provide good health for the king, prosperity for the kingdom, good crops and safety during sea trips are held in those utakis.

=== Ceremonies in Eboshigawa-nu-Utaki ===
This sacred site is a spring located at the foot of the Untamamui (運玉森) hill in Nishihara. It is the location of a legend of the feather dress similar to that of the Morinokawa (森之川) spring in Ginowan. Kikoe-ōgimi used to visit the site during the second and third months of the lunar calendar every year for a ubīnadi (御水撫でぃ) ceremony. Starting in 1691, the ceremony was only held once every three years.

=== Domestic ceremonies ===
The domestic ceremonies in her residence were performed by Kikoe-ōgimi, the women of her close family, high rank priestesses and many followers. Kikoe-ōgimi's residence included the altars of four gods:

- Benzaiten-ganashi-mae (弁財天加那志前) or Mi-osuji-omae (美御すし御前)
- O-hitsubo-suji-ganashi-mae (御火鉢御すじ加那志前) or O-hitsubo-omae (御火鉢御前)
- Kane-no-osuji-ganashi-mae (金の御すじ加那志前) or Kane-no-mi-osuji-omae (金之美御すし御前)
- Chifi-ufujin-ganashi-mae-osuji-okami-ganashi-mae (聞得大君加那志前御すじ御神加那志前) or Chifi-ufujin-mi-osuji-omae (聞得大君美御すし御前)

Kikoe-ōgimi prayed to the four gods every day to obtain health for the king and the princes, good crops of barley, rice and yam and safety for the trips around the islands and abroad.

Special prayers were addressed to O-hitsubo-suji-ganashi-mae and Kane-no-osuji-ganashi-mae on the first, seventh and fifteenth day of each month, still to obtain health for the king and the princes, but also for herself and to obtain the capacity for the members of the royal administrations and the peasants to accomplish their respective tasks.

== Politics ==
There are several examples when Kikoe-ōgimi directly intervened in the political affairs of the kingdom. The first Kikoe-ōgimi, Utuchitunumuigani, is directly responsible for the abdication of Shō Sen’i in favour of his nephew Shō Shin in 1477.

In 1500, Kikoe-ōgimi tells Shō Shin that his military campaign against Yaeyama will only be victorious if he brings with him the noro of Kume Island.

== Residence ==
Kikoe-ōgimi had her own residence, Chifijin Udun (聞得大君御殿), located east of Shuri Castle, that included a temple in addition to the residential area for the priestess.

Tradition says that Chifijin Udun was long located inside Shuri Castle, before it was moved, but there is no document conserved to confirm this theory.

The first mention of the residence on a map puts it in the village of Teshiraji (汀志良次). The map mentions the location of the "former Chifijin Udun" and the "reserve areas around the former Chifijin Udun": this residence was destroyed by fire in 1609 during the Satsuma invasion and rebuilt afterwards at the location of the former Yuntanja Udun. In 1706, Chifijin Udun is transferred for a time in the neighbouring village of Ufuchun (大中村). In 1730 a new residence is built about 150 metres east of the first one in Teshiraji.

A bell is set in the reserve area on the left of Chifijin Udun to warn the people in case of fire.

After annexation by Japan, the temple is transferred to Nakagusuku Udun (中城御殿), another residence of the royal family, and Chifijin Udun is torn down by the end of the Meiji Era. The location of the 1730 residence is currently below the sports ground of Shuri Middle School (首里中学校).

== See also ==
- Noro (priestess)
- Ryukyuan religion
- Sefa-utaki
- Omoro Sōshi
