= Ogiyaka =

Queen of the Ryukyu Kingdom

Ogiyaka 宇喜也嘉
- 世添御殿大按司加那志 (Yushiiudun Ufuanjiganashi) 世添大美御前加那志 (Yushiiufumi Gumeeganashi)

Queen consort of the Ryukyu Kingdom
- Tenure: 1469–1476
- Successor: Kyoni

Queen mother of the Ryukyu Kingdom
- Tenure: 1477–1505
- Born: 1445
- Died: 1505 (aged 59–60)
- Burial: Tamaudun, Shuri
- Spouse: Shō En
- Issue: Shō Shin, Crown Prince Kume-Nakagusuku; Princess Utuchitunumuigani; Uchima Ufuya; Adaniya Wakamatsu; Yamauchi Shōshin
- House: House of Shō

Ogiyaka (宇喜也嘉), also known as Ukiyaka or Yosoidon (1445–1505), was Queen of the Ryukyu Kingdom from 1469 until her death. She married Shō En before he became king, and acted as regent during the early years of Shō Shin's reign.

== Life ==
Ogiyaka was born in 1445, possibly in Shuri, Okinawa. She became the second wife of Kanemaru, and gave birth to a son in 1465 at age 21. After King Shō Toku died, Kanemaru became King of the Ryukyu Kingdom in 1469 and adopted the name Shō En, making their son, Shō Shin, the heir to the throne and their eldest daughter the royal high priestess. She held the titles of 世添御殿大按司加那志 (Yushiiudun Ufuanjiganashi; mistransliterated as Yosoidon) and 世添大美御前加那志 (Yushiiufuchura Gumeeganashi).

Shō En died in 1476, however, and his brother, Shō Sen'i, took the throne. The high priestess promptly had a vision that the King should abdicate in favor of Shō Shin, then almost 13 years old, and Shō Sen'i abdicated. It has been theorized that Ogiyaka orchestrated the abdication to maintain power. Ogiyaka acted as regent for many years until Shō Shin took control from her. During her rule, she oversaw the construction of the Enkaku-ji temple and the Tamaudun mausoleum, as well as the enlargement of the Sogen-ji temple.

She died in 1505 at the age of 61 and was buried in Tamaudun. Stories of "the Queen Mother" persisted as late as the 1540s.

== See also ==
- List of monarchs of Ryukyu Islands
- Ryukyuan religion
