= Shō En =

Ryukyuan king (1415–1476)

Shō En 尚円
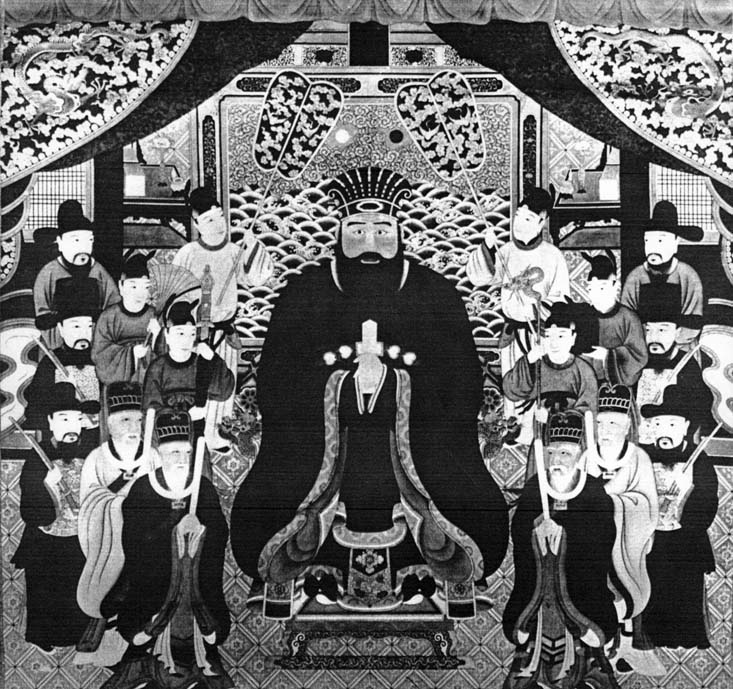
- 18th-century portrait (ugui) of Shō En

King of Ryukyu
- Reign: 1470–1476
- Predecessor: Shō Toku
- Successor: Shō Sen'i
- Born: Umitukugani (思徳金); 1415; Izena Island (traditionally)
- Died: 28 July 1476 (aged 60–61); Shuri, Ryukyu Kingdom
- Burial: Tamaudun, Shuri
- Spouse: Ogiyaka
- Issue: Shō Shin
- Divine name: Kanamaru-aji-sohesuwetsugiwaunise (金丸按司添末続王仁子)
- House: Second Shō dynasty
- Father: Shō Shoku (traditionally)

Shō En (1415 – 28 July 1476), also known as Kanemaru (金丸), was king of the Ryukyu Kingdom from 1470 to 1476. The official histories of the kingdom place his birth on Izena Island, although nothing is known concretely about his origins or family. Later folk tradition in the kingdom traced him to the mythical Shunten dynasty. He is said to have settled in northern Okinawa around the 1440s after a water dispute on his home island, eventually settling in Shuri and serving as a retainer for Shō Taikyū, the Prince of Goeku. Taikyū became king in 1454 and appointed Kanemaru as his treasurer, granting him lordship over Uchima. Shō Toku succeeded his father after his death in 1460. The official histories depict Toku as a cruel ruler who forced Kanemaru into seclusion. Kanemaru was chosen to succeed him after Toku's death in 1470, after which he killed Toku's surviving family and took the regnal name Shō En.

Shō En's reign saw diplomatic and trade difficulties with Japan and China. The Ming dynasty restricted the size and frequency of Ryukyuan tribute missions after emissaries were alleged to have attacked and looted a Chinese household. The outbreak of the Ōnin War in Japan led to widespread piracy, making it unsafe for Ryukyuan ships to travel to the port of Sakai, although the kingdom continued to expand its trade network in Kyushu and the surrounding islands. Shō En died in 1476, initially succeeded by his younger brother Shō Sen'i. Sen'i's reign only lasted six months before his resignation, possibly due to a coup d'état launched by En's queen Ogiyaka. En's son Shō Shin became king. Shō En's descendants, the Second Shō dynasty, ruled the Ryukyu Kingdom for over four centuries.

== Early life ==
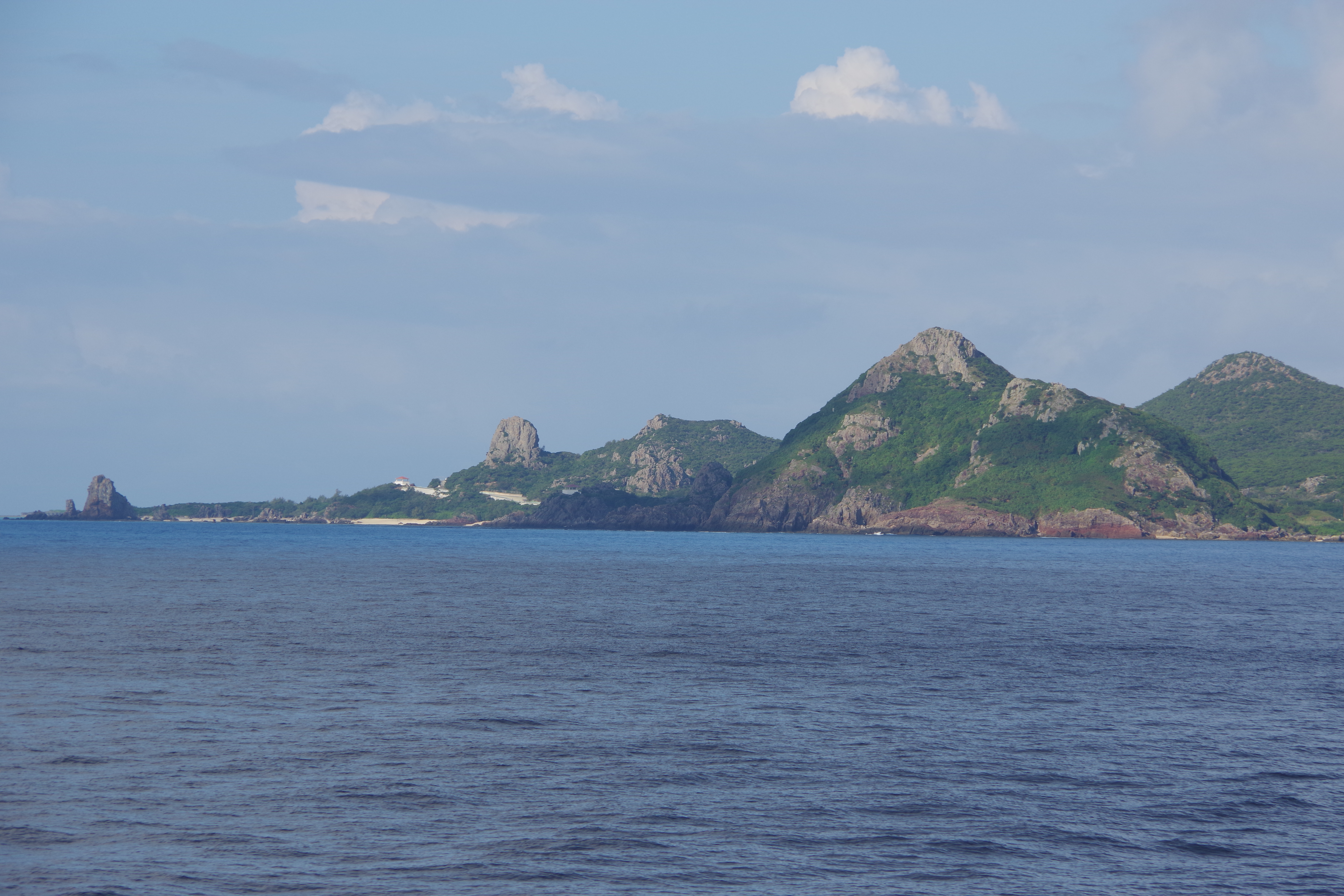
Izena Island, traditionally claimed to be Shō En's birthplace

The official histories of the Ryukyu Kingdom (compiled centuries after his life) state that Shō En was born under the name of Umitokugane (思徳金) to a family of peasants in 1415, later taking the name Kanemaru (金丸). He is purported to have been born near the village of Shomi on Izena, a small island to the north of Okinawa. His father is named Shō Shoku in the official histories, but nothing is concretely known about him. Historian Gregory Smits theorizes that Kanemaru may have instead originated in mainland Japan due to religious ties to a group of possibly Japanese goddesses on Kumejima. Some historical and religious sites on Izena claim ties to his early life. According to local legend, his umbilical cord is buried under a large stone in his purported birthplace, Mihoso-dokoro, a prefectural historical site. To the north of this stone is the purported site of his rice paddy, Sakata.

The 17th century scholar Shō Shōken, the author of the Chūzan Seikan (one of the official histories of the Ryukyu Kingdom), speculated that Kanemaru's family was ultimately descended from a previous ruling dynasty of Okinawa, writing that his "parents were originally island peasants. Today we cannot know what happened before, but one wonders whether they were the descendants of early kings." Popular tradition in the kingdom traced the dynasty to Gihon, the last king of the mythical Shunten dynasty, which was purportedly established in the 12th century by Chūzan's first ruler, Shunten. The Chūzan Seikan described Shunten as the son of the exiled samurai Minamoto no Tametomo, and thus a distant descendant of the Imperial House of Japan. Such genealogies are mythical accounts, likely propagated for political purposes to elevate the importance of the Shō dynasty.

=== Flight to Okinawa ===
Kanemaru was married to a local girl when he was young. After the death of his parents around 1435, he became responsible for supporting the rest of his family, including his sister and younger brother. He extensively farmed his small plot of land to support them. The official histories relate that other farmers accused Kanemaru of stealing water, causing him to flee with his five-year-old brother Sen'i to the fishing village of Ginama on the northern tip of Okinawa. One legend relates that Kanemaru first sought refuge at the home of a blacksmith in the village of Okuma in Kunigami.

For unknown reasons, Kanemaru was forced to flee again five or six years later, and settled in Shuri, the capital of Chūzan. Shō Taikyū, the Prince of Goeku, purportedly hired him as a retainer.

It is said that Kanamaru fathered a child with the Aniya Noro (priestess) while he was living there in hiding prior to his ascension to the throne. His name was Nakagusuku Wakamatsu.

Shō Taikyū became the king of Chūzan in 1454, and hired Kanemaru as the manager of his royal household, and later as his treasurer and the manager of the Naha harbor. He was appointed the Lord of Uchima in 1454. After Shō Taikyū's death in 1460 and the succession of his son Shō Toku, Kanemaru is said to have gone into seclusion at his castle in Uchima. By the early 1460s, he took a second wife, Ogiyaka, who bore his eldest son. This son later reigned under the name Shō Shin.

=== Rise to power ===
The Chūzan Seikan describes Shō Toku as a cruel and greedy ruler who killed innocent people and forced officials into hiding. After his death from unrecorded causes in 1470, a group of officials gathered to debate the succession. One legend describes the succession instead taking place after Shō Toku became romantically attached to a priestess on Kudakajima and left the throne vacant; after hearing of the coup, Shō Toku was said to have drowned himself. Smits writes that this story is likely anachronistic, but that Shō Toku may not have died of natural causes, describing Shō En as the leader of a coup against Toku.

According to the official histories, an old man declared to the gathered ministers that Shō Toku had been depraved and evil, calling on them to "kill the crown prince (Toku's son), elevate the virtuous, and bring peace to the country". A group of ministers then traveled to Ushima and asked Kanemaru to become king. He was said to have been greatly surprised and declined the offer before finally accepting. After Kanemaru took the throne, he ordered a group of soldiers to capture and kill the prior crown prince, a seven or eight year old boy, alongside his mother and wet nurse.

Kanemaru took the regnal name Shō En, continuing to use the surname of the previous dynasty, Shō (尚). The old dynasty adopted this name in 1430 under Shō Hashi, purportedly granted to the dynasty by the Ming emperor. Due to the shared surname, the two dynasties are historically distinguished as the First Shō and Second Shō dynasties.

== Reign ==
Shō En ruled from Shuri Castle accompanied by several hundred retainers. He did not prioritize ideological or symbolic matters, leading Smits to write that he "ruled in the manner of a powerful wakō (pirate) leader". He is credited with rebuilding the temple of Gokuraku-ji after it burnt down, relocating it to near Urasoe and renaming it to Ryūfuku-ji. Alongside Shō Taikyu and Shō Toku, Shō En was one of only three Ryukyuan rulers to mint coins before the introduction of tōmasen coins in 1715. These cash coins are known as kanamaru sehō or kin'en sehō. Little is known about them other than that they are made from higher quality metal than those made by previous rulers.

In the 1471 and 1472 entries of the Ming Veritable Records, Shō En is named as Sho Toku's son; an impossibility, as En was older than Toku. Ryukyuan diplomats frequently falsified non-violent succession when meeting with Ming authorities after a coup d'état. In 1474, a group of Ryukyuan emissaries were alleged to have attacked the home of a man named Chen Erguan, killing him and his wife before looting the house and burning it down. The Chenghua Emperor ordered Shō En to punish the embassy, and imposed restrictions on the size and frequency of Ryukyuan tribute missions. The Ryukyuan government responded in 1476, praising China and claiming that Ryukyuan diplomats would not have committed such an act. This appeal was unsuccessful, and the Ming court continued to restrict Ryukyuan trade missions. Likely fraudulent embassies claiming to be representatives of Shō En arrived in Joseon after his death in 1483 and 1491.

Trade with Japan broke down in the late 1460s and 1470s with the outbreak of the Ōnin War and the Sengoku period. Pirates became widespread across the Seto Inland Sea, making the voyage to the trade port of Sakai in Kinai too risky for Ryukyuan ships. Japanese merchants in Sakai relied on products such as dye, incense, and medicine obtained from Okinawa, and some began to make trips to the island without acquiring trade licenses. The ruling Ashikaga shogunate tasked the Shimazu clan to apprehend merchants attempting to make illicit voyages to Ryukyu. However, Ryukyu's trade network in the region continued to expand, with Okinawan merchants establishing ties with the trade port of Hakata on Kyushu and various regional Japanese clans, such as the Tanegashima clan, the Sō clan of Tsushima, and the Ōuchi clan of Bungo.

== Death and succession ==
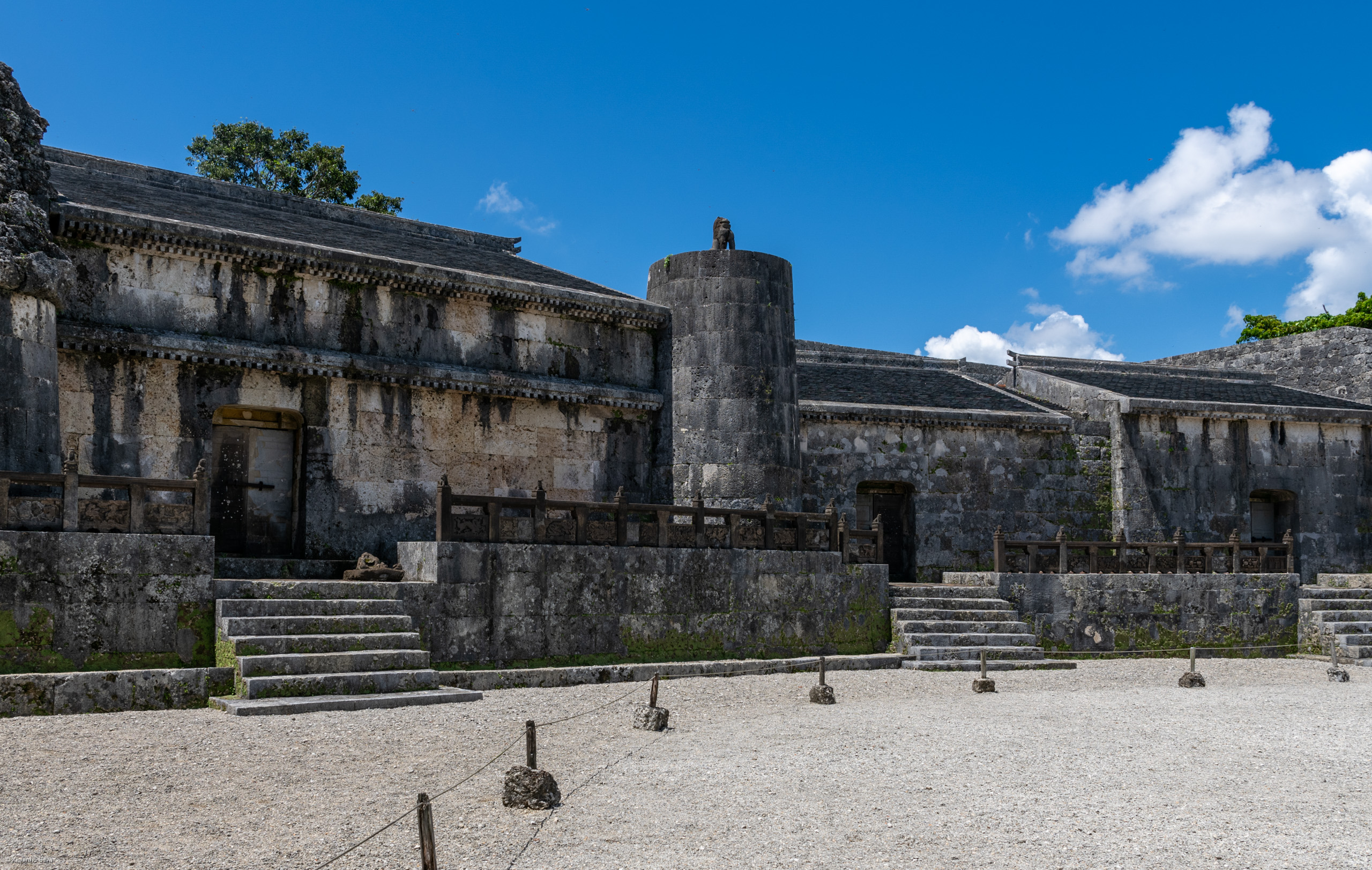
Tamaudun, the mausoleum of Shō En and his descendants

According to the 18th century Chūzan Seifu (Genealogy of Chūzan), Shō En died on 28 July 1476. Under Shō Shin's rule, he was interred at the new royal mausoleum of Tamaudun.

Shō En appointed his brother Shō Sen'i as the lord of Goeku, which likely indicated that he intended Sen'i to serve as his heir. The Chūzan Seifu instead states that Shō En's son Shō Shin was his designated successor, but that the kingdom's officials had chosen Sen'i in his place after his death due to Shin's young age. Sen'i ascended to the throne in 1477, but is said to have failed to adhere to proper rituals during coronation, and was compelled to resign six months later, dying soon after. Historians such as Smits and Takara Kurayoshi have attributed the myth to a coup launched against Sen'i in the name of Shō Shin by his mother Ogiyaka. In the Chūzan Seifu, Shō En is given the divine name Kanamaru-aji-sohesuwetsugiwaunise (金丸按司添末続王仁子).

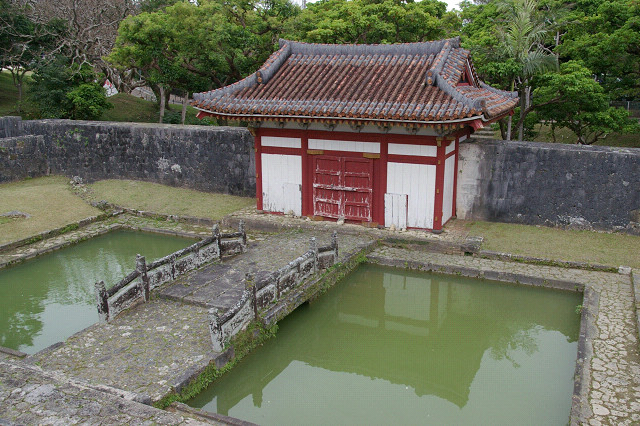
Enkaku-ji, erected in Shō En's honor by Shō Shin

Under Shō Shin, the Ryukyu Kingdom began an expansionist administrative state. His descendants, the Second Shō dynasty, would rule the Ryukyu kingdom until the deposition of Shō Tai in 1879.

=== Legacy ===
In 1495, Shō Shin erected the Rinzai Zen temple of Enkaku-ji (literally 'En's Enlightenment Temple') at Shuri in honor of Shō En. Shō En was the earliest king to be made the subject of a posthumous painting (ugui) showing him surrounded by attendants while wearing Ming-styled robes. Like the other ugui, this portrait was destroyed in 1945 during the Battle of Okinawa and survives only through photographs. Shō Shin is also credited with constructing Izena Tamaudun as a royal mausoleum for Shō En's parents. In 1995, King Shō En's Garden Park (Shōen'ōoniwakōen) and a large statue of the king were built near the mausoleum and the adjacent Izena Castle to celebrate the 580 anniversary of his birth. Fifteen years later, an equestrian statue of Shō En was built at Tsuisui Park on the island.

Regnal titles
Preceded by Shō Toku	King of Ryūkyū; 1470–1476	Succeeded by Shō Sen'i
