= Kunigami Seiya =

Kunigami Aji Seiya (国頭 按司 正弥; 1591–1635), also known by his Chinese style name Ba Zuisai (馬 瑞彩), was a bureaucrat of Ryukyu Kingdom.

He was the sixth head of the aristocrat family called Kunigami Udun (国頭御殿). He was sent to Kagoshima as a hostage in 1614. When he heard about the Siege of Osaka breaking out, he requested to join the army, and received permission of Shimazu Iehisa. He wore wafuku and changed his name to Kunigami Samanokami (国頭左馬頭), and received weapons from Iehisa. Before he arrived on the battlefield, the war ended. He sailed back to Ryukyu in 1616.

Kunigami Seiya
Preceded by Kunigami Seiei	head of Kunigami Udun	Succeeded by Kunigami Seisoku
