= Kunigami Seisoku =

Kunigami Wōji Seisoku (国頭 王子 正則; ? – ?), also known by his Chinese style name Ba Kokuryū (馬 国隆), was a bureaucrat of Ryukyu Kingdom.

He was the seventh head of the aristocrat family called Kunigami Udun (国頭御殿), and was also the eldest son of Kunigami Seiya (国頭 正弥). His rank was Aji (lord) at first. In 1643, he was elevated to the rank Wōji (prince) though he had no royal blood, and dispatched to express the gratitude of King Shō Ken's accession to Edo, Japan. He reached Edo in the next year, and sailed back to Ryukyu in winter. He was also dispatched to celebrate Tokugawa Ietsuna become the new shōgun in 1653.

Prince Kunigami was sent to Satsuma Domain for several times and played important role in diplomacy to Satsuma. He was a friend of Shimazu Mitsuhisa (島津 光久), the daimyō of Satsuma. After the invasion of Ryukyu, a member of sanshikan should be taken as hostage in Kagoshima for three years. Henza Chōchō (平安座 朝暢, also known by Chatan Chōchō) was sent to Kagoshima to seek rescission of it, but was rejected by karō of Satsuma. Prince Kunigami requested it in a banquet and was approved by Mitsuhisa.

Prince Kunigami was a political opponent of Haneji Chōshū.

Kunigami Seisoku
Preceded by Kunigami Seiya	head of Kunigami Udun	Succeeded by Kunigami Seibi
