= Shō Shoku =

Shō Shoku (尚 稷; ? – 1434) was the father of King Shō En, the founder of the Second Shō dynasty of the Ryukyu Kingdom.

Shō Shoku was born into a family of peasant farmers on Izena Island, a small island which lies off the northwestern coast of Okinawa Island. He married Zuiun (瑞雲), and had a daughter and two sons: Abu-ganashi (阿武加那志), Shō En, and Shō Sen'i.

Shō Shoku and his wife died when their offsprings were young. He was posthumously honored as king in 1699, and his spirit tablet was placed in Sōgen-ji. His title was stripped in 1719, and his spirit tablet was moved to Tennō-ji.
