= Izena Castle =

Coordinates: 26°54′53″N 127°57′09″E

Izena Castle 伊是名城
- Izena, Okinawa, Japan
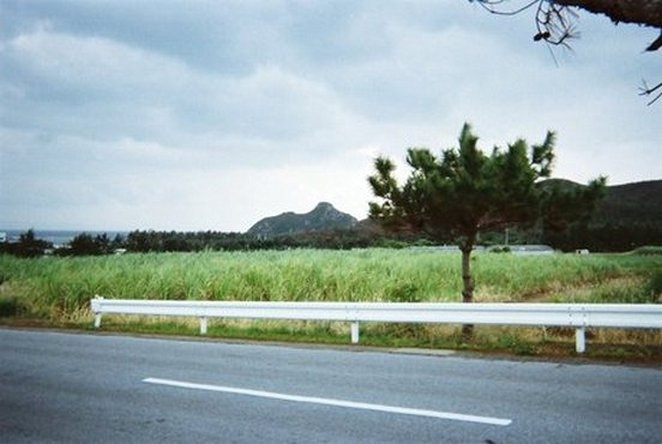

Site information
- Type: Gusuku
- Controlled by: Chief of Iheya Island (14th century-15th century); Ryūkyū Kingdom (15th century–1879); Empire of Japan (1879–1945); United States Military Government of the Ryukyu Islands(1945-1950); United States Civil Administration of the Ryukyu Islands(1950-1972); Japan(1972-present)
- Open to the public: yes
- Condition: Ruins

Location

Site history
- Built: early 14th century
- Built by: Samekawa
- In use: early 14th century-16th century
- Materials: Ryūkyūan limestone, wood

Garrison information
- Occupants: Samekawa, Aji of Izena Magiri

Izena Castle (伊是名城, Izena-jo; Okinawan: Ijina Gushiku) is a Ryūkyūan gusuku on Izena Island. It was built around the 14th century by Samekawa, son of the Yogura Chief of Iheya Island. It is built over a limestone outcrop about 100 metres (330 ft) above sea level on the south eastern side of the island. The castle has three sides which are near vertical cliffs; the south, west and east faces of the castle are rock cliffs, while the northern side provides entry to the castle through a series of steps cut into the hill. There are several chambers in the castle which are separated by walls, built with piled-up pieces of Ryūkyūan limestone, 3 metres (9.8 ft) in height. The chambers have many sacred relics such as utaki (holy enclosures of the Ryūkyūan religion) and also celadons, Sueki wares, and other important objects, which are also seen in other gusuku sites. King Shō Shin built Izena Tamaudun near the castle.
