= Tamaudun =

Former mausoleum of the Ryukyu Kingdom

- 玉陵 (Japanese)
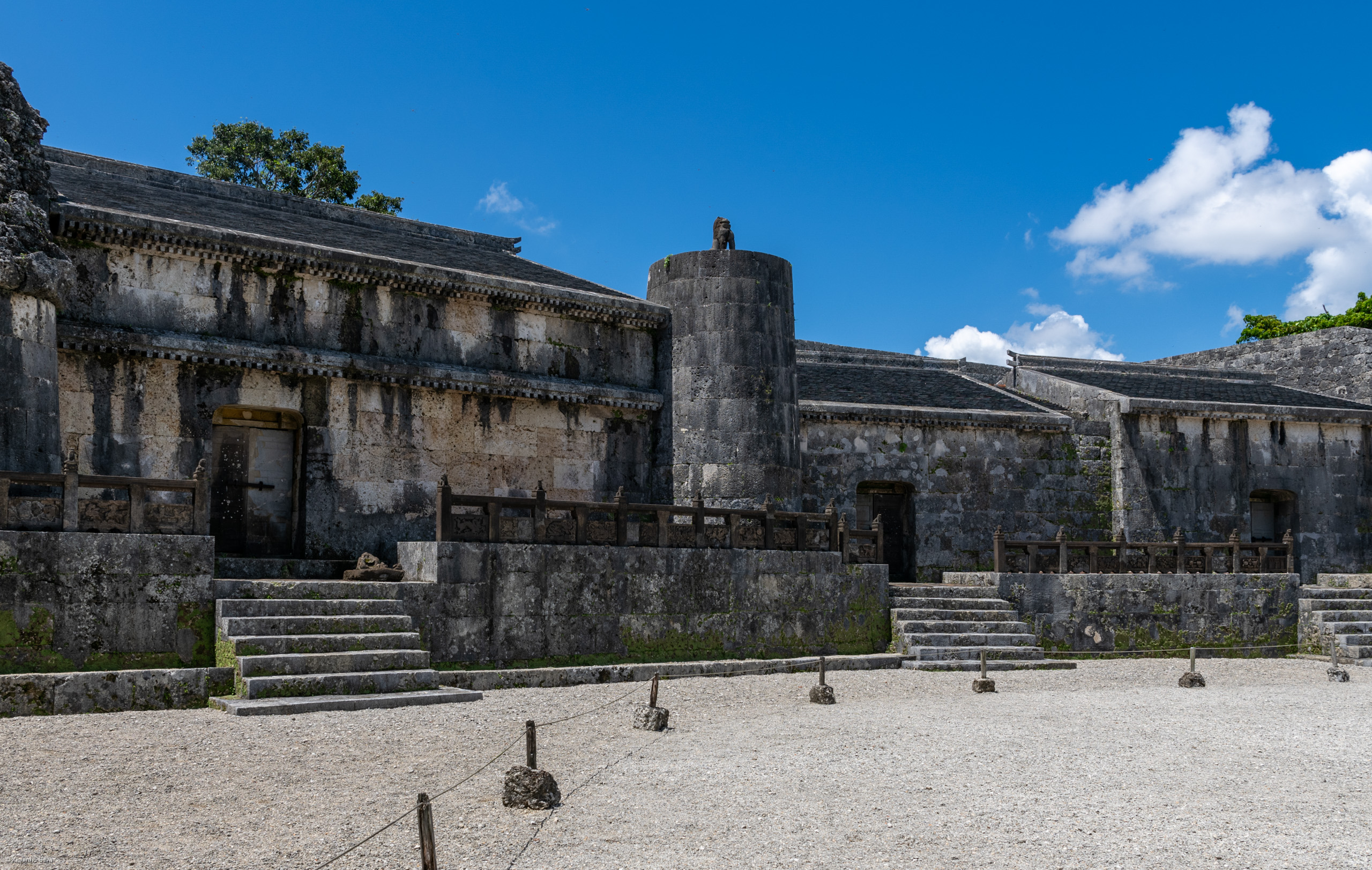
- Tamaudun Royal Mausoleum

- Tamaudun Tamaudun (Japan)
- Interactive map of Tamaudun
- 26°13′06″N 127°42′53″E
- Type: Masoleum
- Location: Naha, Okinawa, Japan
- Region: Okinawa

History
- Built: 1501

UNESCO World Heritage Site
- Criteria: Cultural: ii, iii, vi
- Reference: 972
- Inscription: 2000 (24th Session)
- National Treasure Important Cultural Property National Historic Site of Japan

Tamaudun (玉陵) is one of the three royal mausoleums of the Second Shō Dynasty of kings of the Ryukyu Kingdom, along with Urasoe yōdore at Urasoe Castle and Izena Tamaudun near Izena Castle in Izena, Okinawa. The mausoleum is located in Shuri, Okinawa, and was built in 1501 by King Shō Shin, the third king (reigned 1477–1527), to bury his father, King Shō En a short distance from Shuri Castle. The Tamaudun complex was designated a National Historic Site in 1972. It was designated a World Heritage Site by UNESCO on December 2, 2000, as a part of the site group Gusuku Sites and Related Properties of the Kingdom of Ryukyu and a National Treasure in 2018.

== Overview ==
The Tamaudun site, covering an area of 2,442 m^{2}, consists of two stone-walled enclosures and the north-facing mausoleum itself, made of three compartments and backed by a natural cliff to the south. A stone stele in the outer enclosure memorializes the construction of the mausoleum, which was finished in 1501, and lists the name of Shō Shin along with those of eight others involved in the construction. The three compartments of the mausoleum are laid out from east to west, with kings and queens of the Ryukyu Kingdom entombed in the eastern compartment and the princes and other members of the royal family in the western compartment. The third, central chamber was used for the Ryukyuan tradition of senkotsu; remains would only be kept here for a limited time to allow for decomposition, after which the bones were washed and placed in urns in the western or eastern chamber depending on the royal status of the deceased.

The exterior of the structure is separated into an outer garden and a courtyard paved with coral fragments, surrounded by a stone wall. The shisa (stone lions) guarding the tomb are examples of traditional Ryūkyūan stone sculpture. The architectural style of the mausoleum represents that of the royal palace at the time, which was a stone structure with a wooden roof.

Being located near the Japanese Supreme Commander's office during the 1945 Battle of Okinawa, the mausoleum was caught in the crossfire of concentrated artillery bombardment along with Shuri Castle, suffering extensive damage, including the destruction of the east and west chambers. The ruins were subsequently looted, but the tombs and royal remains themselves remained intact, and much of the structure has since been restored. In 1992 Hiroshi Shō, the great-grandson of Shō Tai, the last king of the Ryūkyū Kingdom, donated Tamaudun and the royal gardens of Shikina-en to the City of Naha.

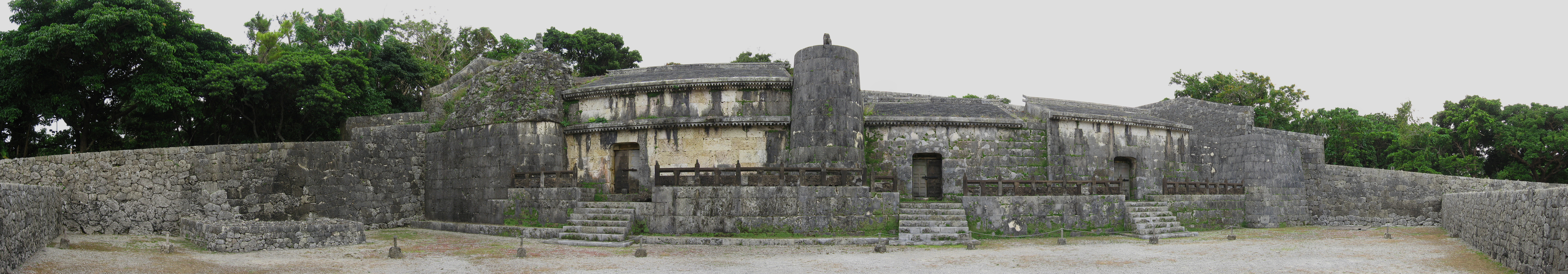

== Burials ==
Seventeen of the 19 kings of the Second Shō Dynasty who ruled between 1470 and 1879 are entombed at Tamaudun, along with various queens and royal children. The first person to be buried there was Shō En, for whom the mausoleum was constructed upon the orders of his son and successor, Shō Shin. However, for approximately 25 years, Shō En was not initially interred here, given that he died in 1476 and the mausoleum was not completed until 1501. Other monarchs not interred here include Shō Sen'i (1430–1477), who was not later re-interred here as his brother was, and Shō Nei (1564–1620) who chose to be interred separately in Urasoe yōdore in the aftermath of the Invasion of Ryukyu. The last interree was former Prince of Nakagusuku, Shō Ten, the son of the Ryūkyū Kingdom's last king, Shō Tai, who was entombed there in 1920 in accordance with traditional Ryūkyūan royal funerary rites, followed by his wife Shōko, Nodake Aji-ganashi, in 1931. Some of the identities of some corpses were still unknown, including a single corpse in Central Chamber that was speculated to be Mukuta Ufutuchi.

- Eastern Chamber (37 sarcophagi, 40 corpses)
- No. 1: Shō En (1415–1476)
- No. 2: Shō Shin (1465–1526) & Shō Sei (1497–1555)
- No. 3: Shō Gen (1528–1572)
- No. 4: Shō Baigaku (尚 梅岳; d. 1605), Queen consort of Shō Gen
- No. 5: Shō Ei (1559–1588) & Aoriya anji Kanashi (阿応理屋按司加那志; Queen consort of Shō Nei)
- No. 6: Shō Konkō (尚 坤功; 1562–1637), Queen consort of Shō Ei
- No. 7: Shō Hō (1590–1640)
- No. 8: Shō Baigan (尚 梅岩; unknown), Queen consort of Shō Hō; & Shō Kyō (1612–1631), Crown Prince, eldest son of Shō Hō
- No. 9: (unknown)
- No. 10: Shō Rankei (尚 蘭閨; 1588–1661), Queen consort of Shō Hō
- No. 11: Shō Ken (1625–1647)
- No. 12: Shō Kaho (尚 花囿; 1630–1666), Queen consort of Shō Ken
- No. 13: Shō Shitsu (1629–1668)
- No. 14: Shō Hakusō (尚 栢窓; 1629–1699), Queen consort of Shō Shitsu
- No. 15: Shō Tei (1645–1709)
- No. 16: Shō Gesshin (尚 月心; 1645–1703), Queen consort of Shō Tei
- No. 17: Shō Jun (1660–1706), Crown Prince, eldest son of Shō Tei
- No. 18: Shō Giun (尚 義雲; 1664–1723), Crown Princess of Shō Jun
- No. 19: Shō Eki (1678–1712)
- No. 20: Shō Konkō (尚 坤宏; 1680–1745), Queen consort of Shō Eki
- No. 21: Shō Kei (1700–1751)
- No. 22: Shō Ninshitsu (尚 仁室; 1705–1779), Queen consort of Shō Kei
- No. 23: Shō Boku (1739–1794)
- No. 24: Shō Shukutoku (尚 淑徳; 1740–1779), Queen consort of Shō Boku
- No. 25: Shō Tetsu (1759–1788), Crown Prince, eldest son of Shō Boku
- No. 26: Shō Tokutaku (尚 徳沢; 1762–1795), Queen consort of Shō Tetsu
- No. 27: Shō On (1784–1802)
- No. 28: Shō Sentoku (尚 仙徳; 1785–1869), Queen consort of Shō On
- No. 29: Shō Sei (1800–1803)
- No. 30: Shō Kō (1787–1834)
- No. 31: Shō Juntoku (尚 順徳; 1791–1854), Queen consort of Shō Kō
- No. 32: Shō Iku (1813–1847)
- No. 33: Shō Gentei (尚 元貞; 1814–1864), Queen consort of Shō Iku
- No. 34: Shō Tai (1843–1901)
- No. 35: Shō Kenshitsu (尚 賢室; 1843–1868), Queen consort of Shō Tai
- No. 36: Shō Ten (1864–1920), Crown Prince, eldest son of Shō Tai
- No. 37: Shō Shōko (尚 祥子; dates unknown), Crown Princess, wife of Shō Ten
- Central Chamber (1 sarcophagus, 1 corpse)
- No. 1 (unknown) speculated to be Mukuta Ufutuchi (木田 大時; unknown)
- Western Chamber (32 sarcophagi, 32 corpses)
- No. 1: (unknown)
- No 2: Shō Gesshin (尚 月清; unknown), eldest daughter of Shō En, 1st Kikoe-ōgimi
- No. 3: Shō Ikō (尚 維衡; 1494–1540), eldest son of Shō Shin; & Shō Bainan (尚 梅南; d. 1577), eldest daughter of Shō Ikō, 2nd Kikoe-ōgimi
- No. 4: Shō Shōi (尚 韶威; unknown), third son of Shō Shin
- No. 5: Shō Isshi (尚 一枝; d. 1570), eldest daughter of Shō Gen
- No. 6: Shō Setsurei (尚 雪嶺; unknown), wife of Shō Gen
- No. 7: Shō Bairei (尚 梅嶺; unknown), wife of Shō Gen
- No. 8–9: (unknown)
- No. 10: Shō Getsurei (尚 月嶺; 1584–1653), second daughter of Shō Ei, 4th Kikoe-ōgimi
- No. 11–13: (unknown)
- No. 14: Shō Ryōgetsu (尚 涼月; 1597–1634), wife of Shō Hō
- No. 15: Shō Setsurei (尚 雪嶺; d. 1697), Crown Princess, wife of Shō Kyō
- No. 16: Shō Ryōchoku (尚 亮直; unknown), Crown Princess, wife of Shō Bun (尚 文)
- No. 17–20: (unknown)
- No. 21: Shō Kyū (1560–1620), third son of Shō Gen
- No. 22: Shō Yō (尚 膺; 1813–1815), second son of Shō Kō
- No. 23: Shō Ken (尚 健; b. 1818), fourth son of Shō Kō
- No. 24: Shō Ten (尚 腆; 1829–1833), seventh son of Shō Kō
- No. 25: Shō Shun (尚 濬; 1832–1844), eldest son of Shō Iku
- No. 26–31: (unknown)
- No. 32: Shō Otoko (尚 オト子; unknown), fifth daughter of Shō Tai; & Shō Michiko (尚 ミチ子; unknown), sixth daughter of Shō Tai

== Gallery ==
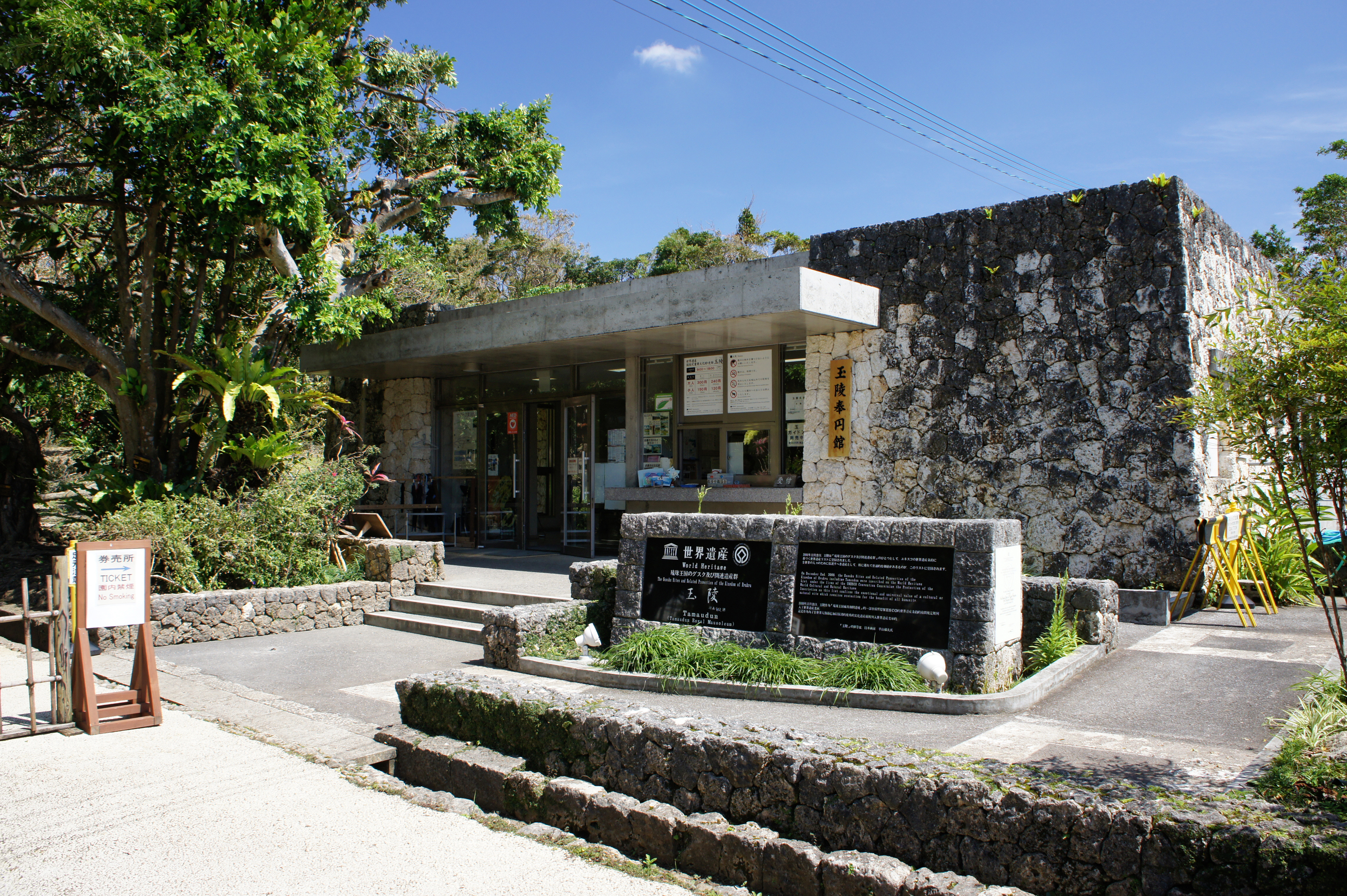
Ticket booth

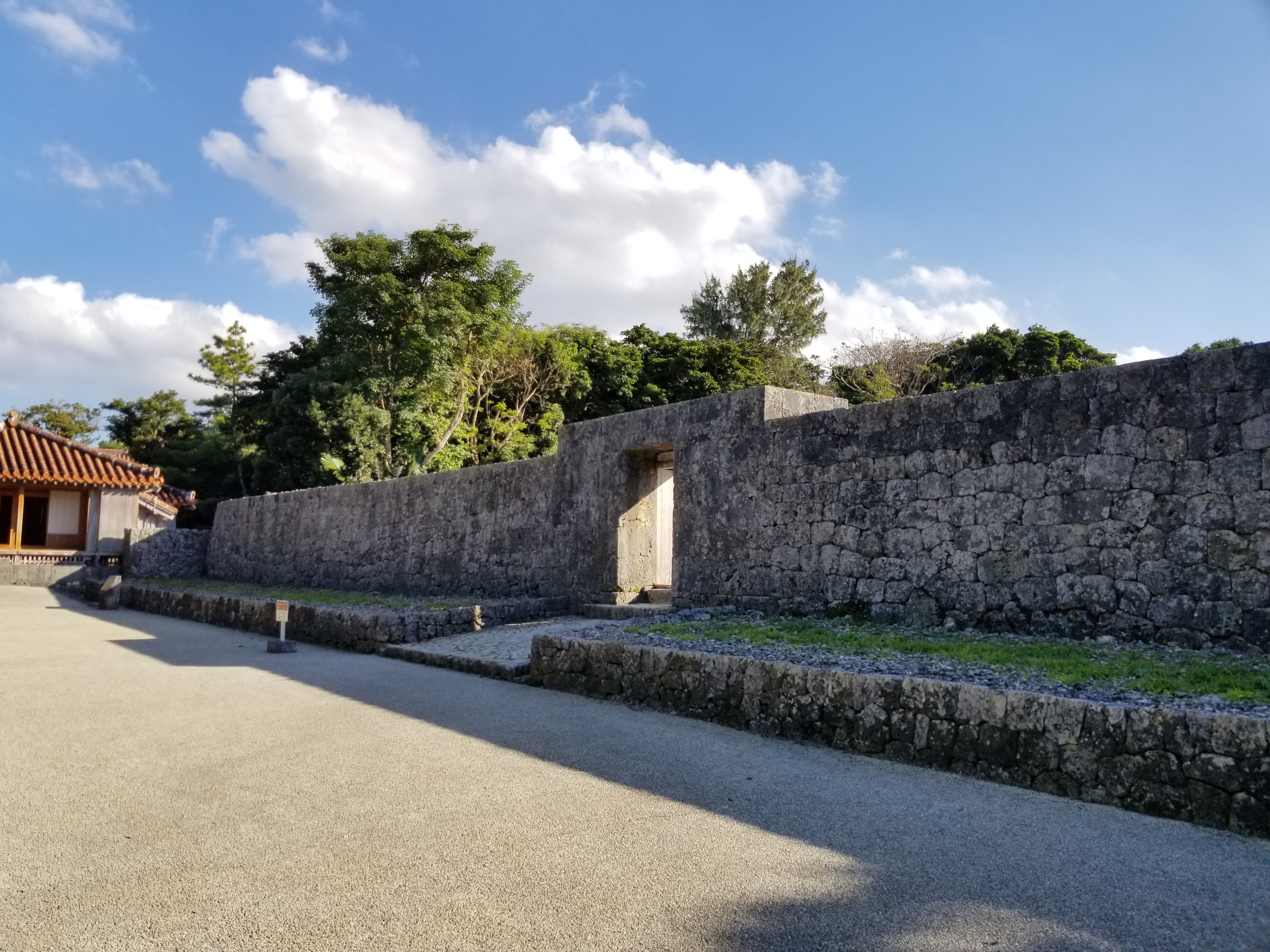
First gate

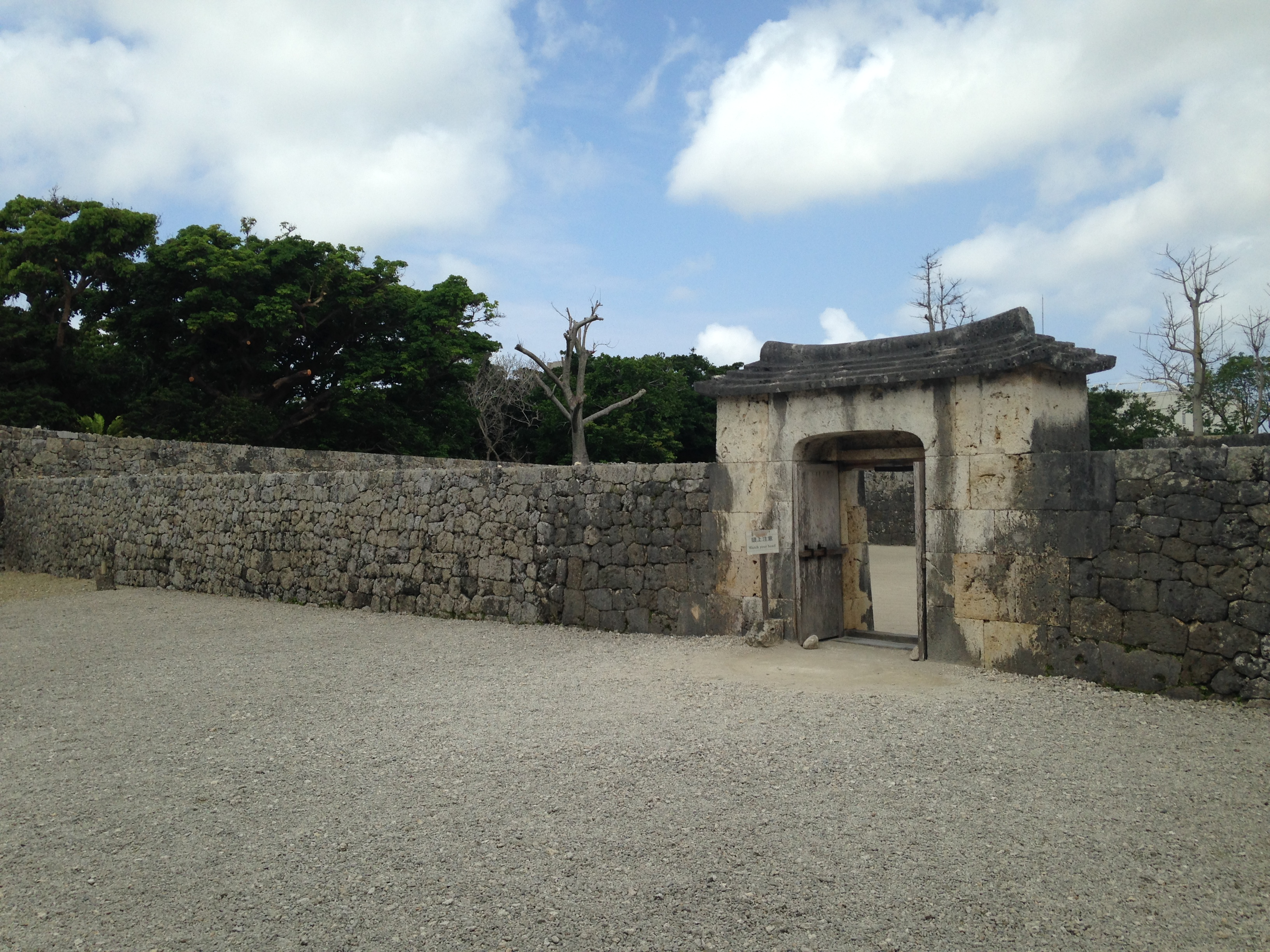
Second gate (from interior)

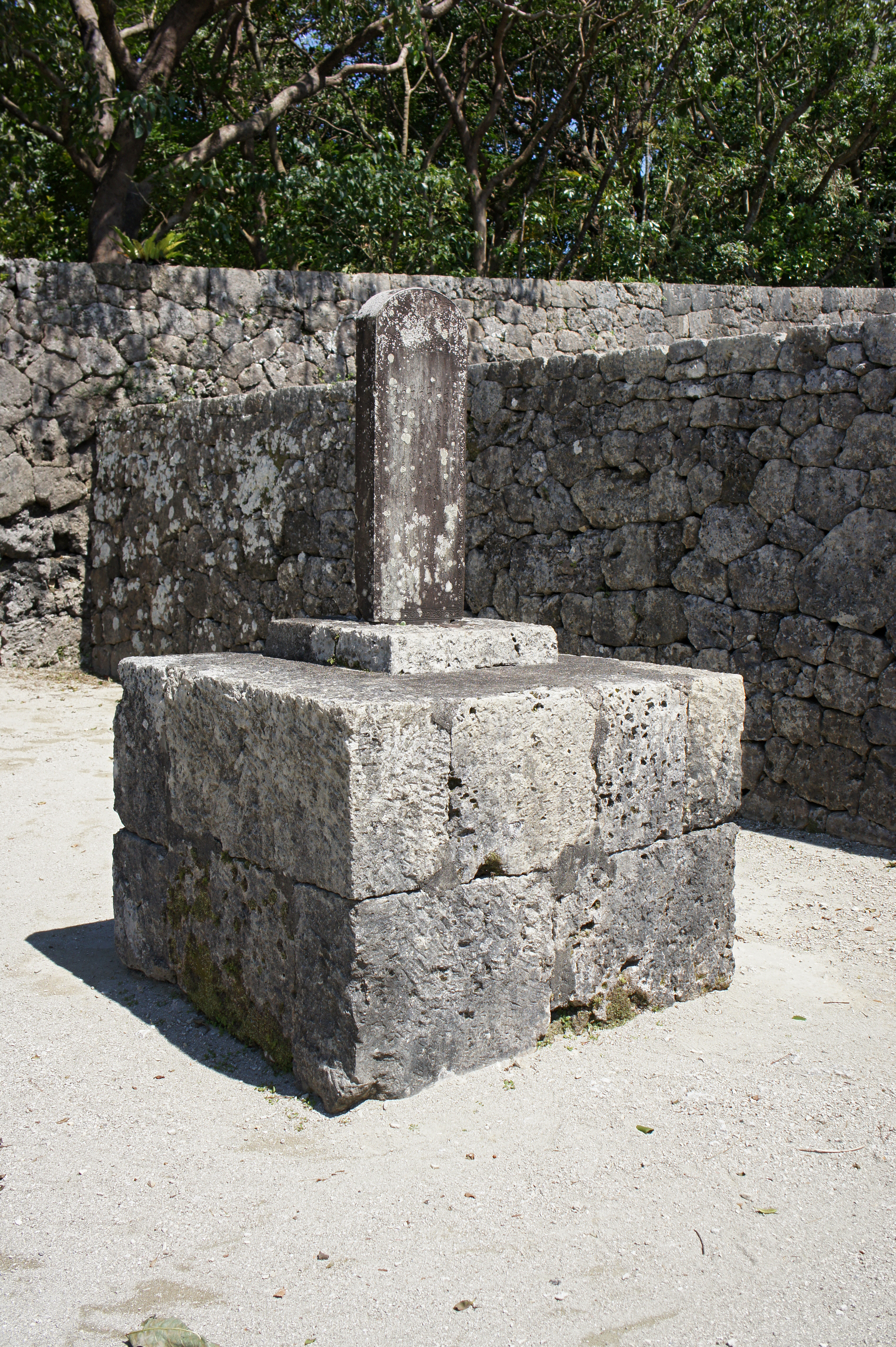
"Jade Monument"

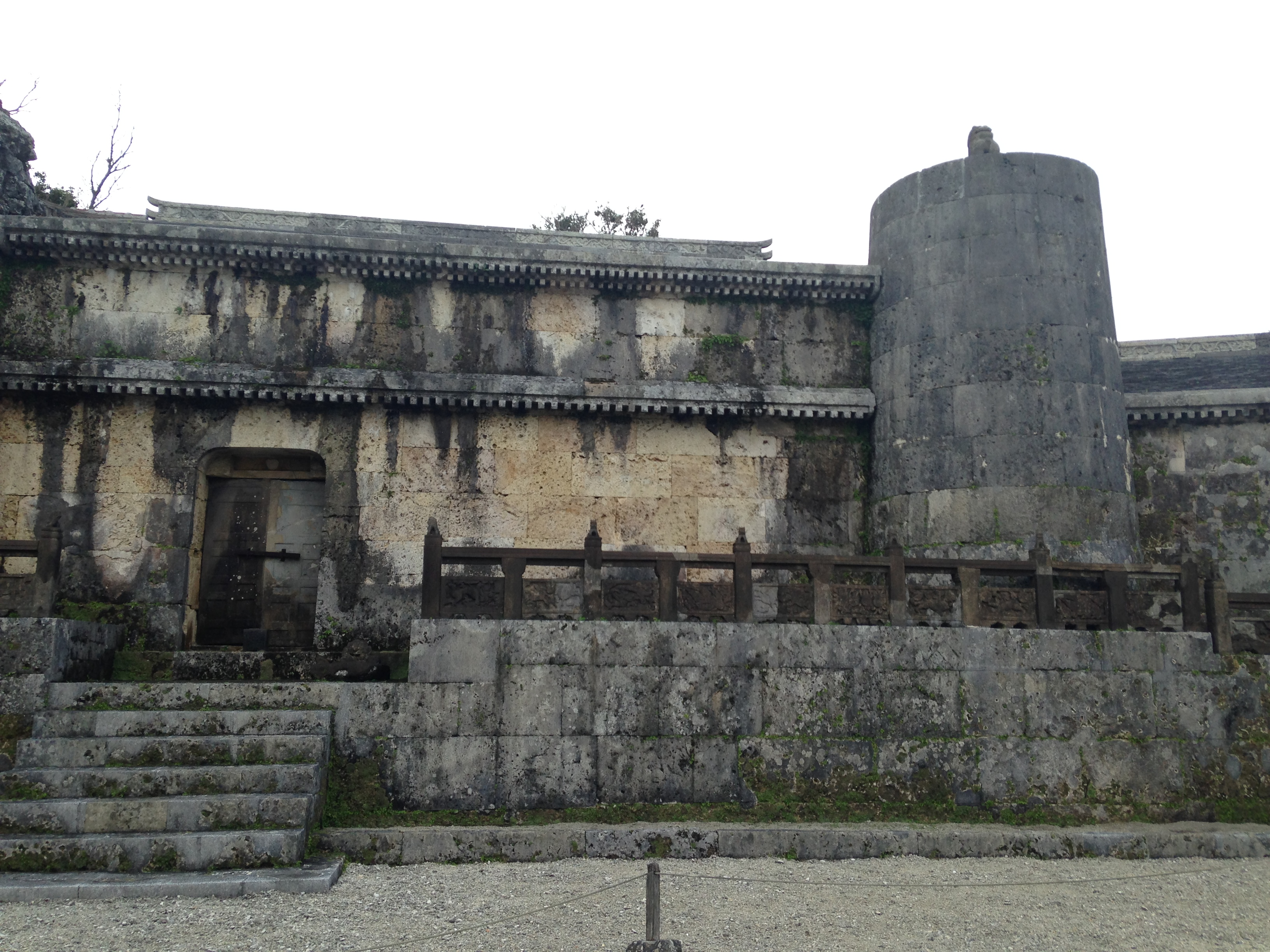
East Chamber

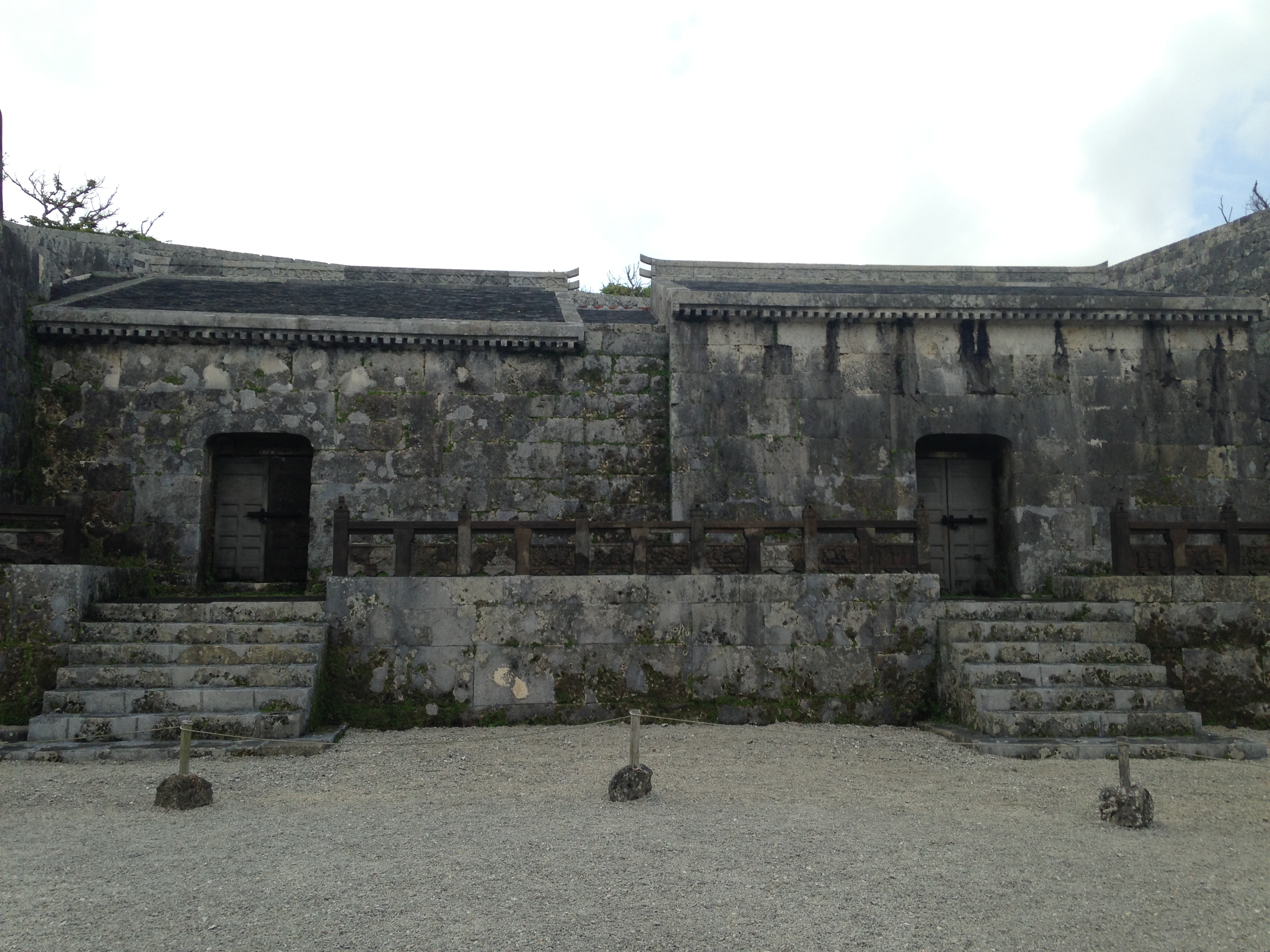
Central (left) and West (right) Chambers

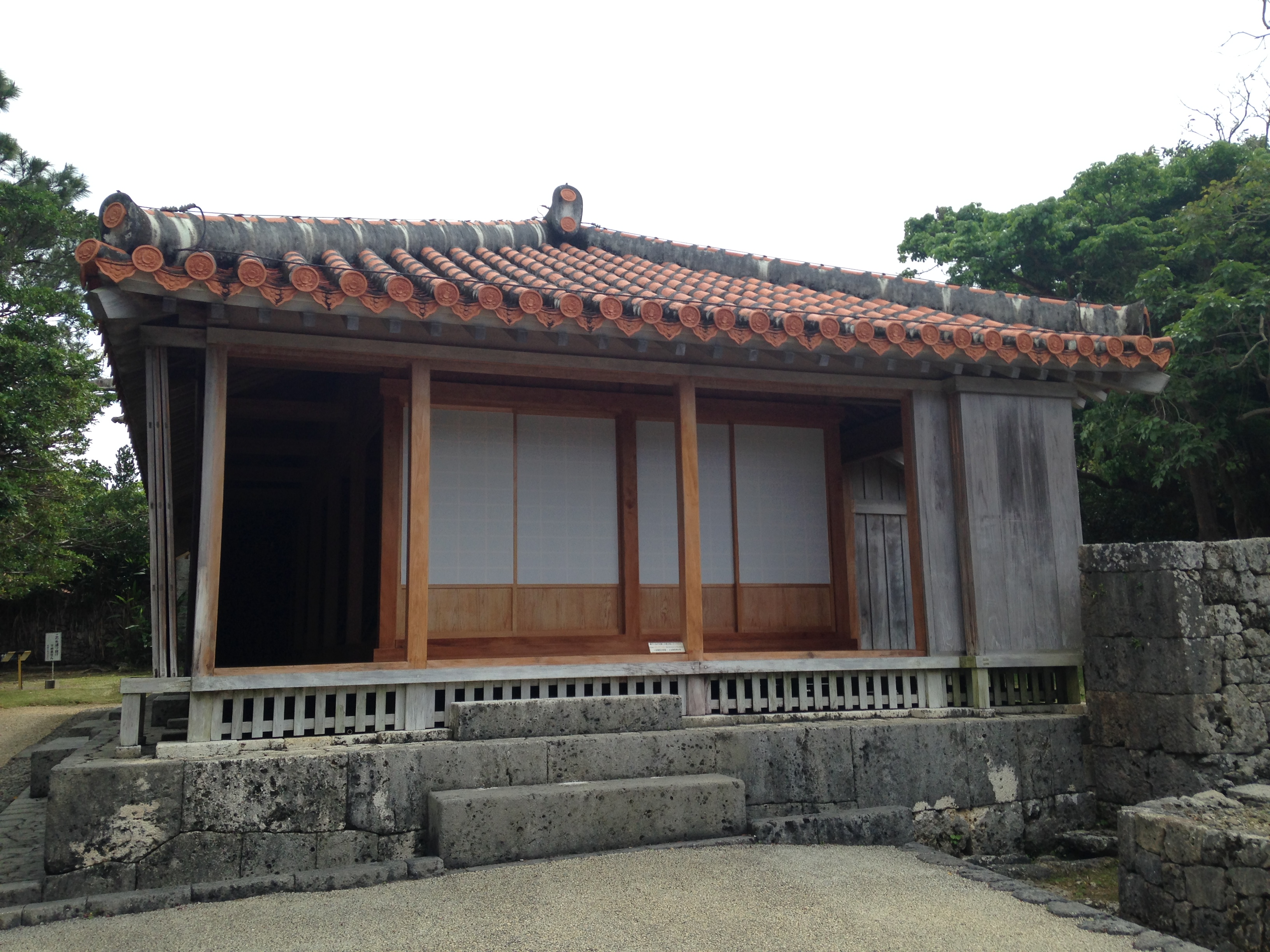
East Ubanju

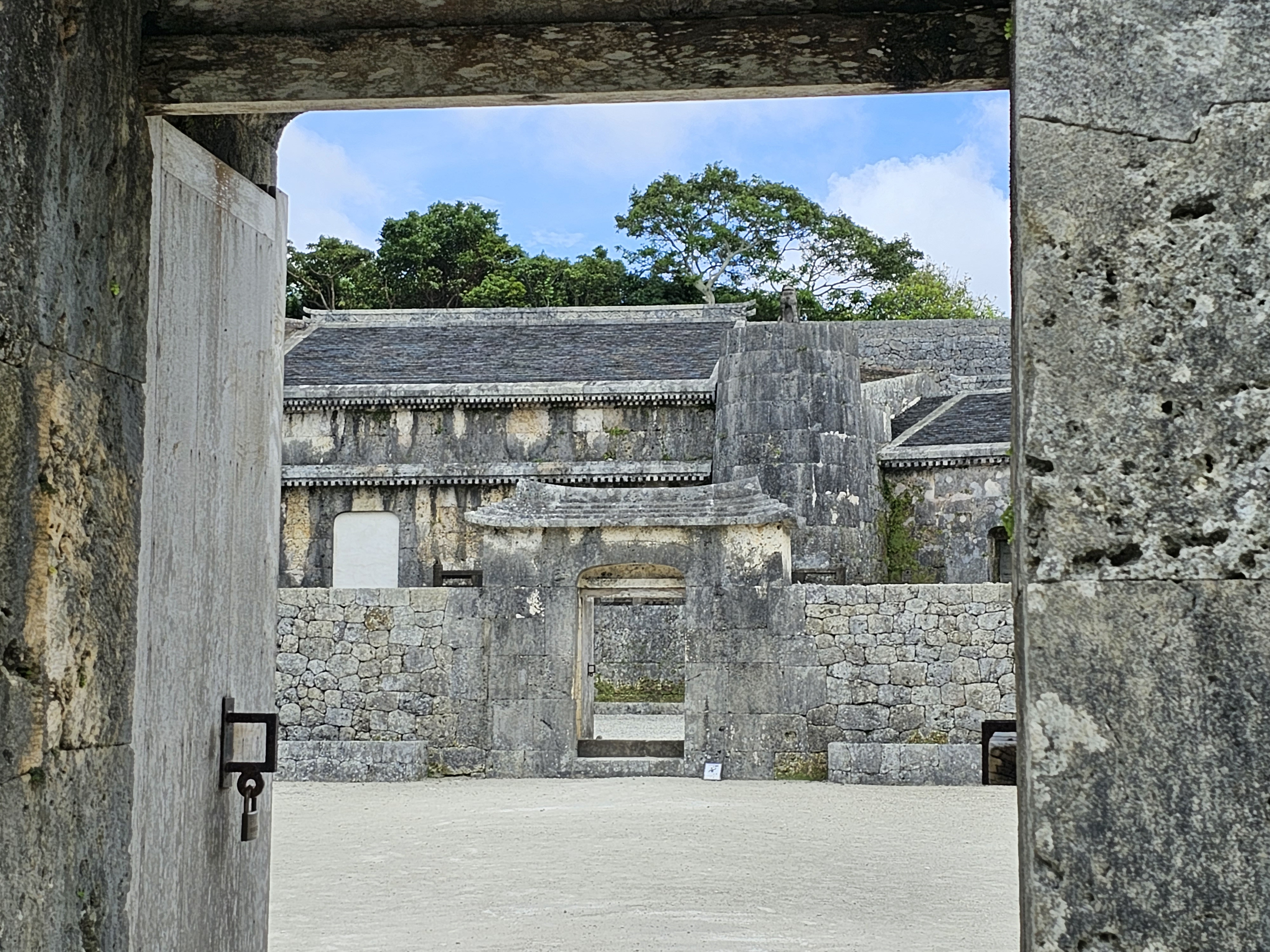
sealed East Chamber

== See also ==
- List of Historic Sites of Japan (Okinawa)
- List of Important Cultural Properties of Japan (Okinawa: structures)
