= Shō Shin =

Shō Shin 尚真
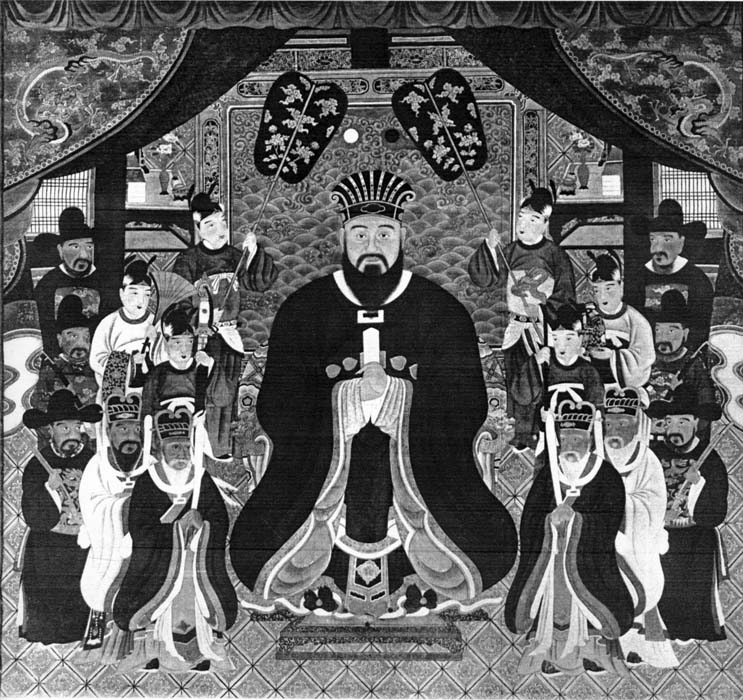
- Formal royal portrait of King Shō Shin by Kobashigawa Chōan.

King of Ryūkyū
- Reign: 1477–1527
- Predecessor: Shō Sen'i
- Successor: Shō Sei
- Born: Makatotarugani (真加戸樽金 makututarugani); 1465
- Died: 13 January 1527 (aged 61–62); Shuri, Ryukyu Kingdom
- Burial: 1527; Tamaudun, Shuri
- Spouse: Kyoni
- Concubine: Umitogani Ajiganashi; Daughter of Mekaru Shī, Mekaru Village
- Issue: Shō Ikō, Prince Urasoe Chōman (founder of Oroku Udun); Shō Chōei, Prince Ozato; Shō Shōi, Prince Nakijin Chōten; Shō Ryūtoku, Prince Goeku Chōtoku (founder of Kamida Dunchi); Shō Sei, Crown Prince Nakagusuku; Shō Kyōjin, Prince Kin; Shō Gendō, Prince Tomigusuku; Princess Sashisaka Ajiganashi
Names
- Shō Shin (尚真)
- Divine name: Ogiyakamowi (於義也嘉茂慧 ujakamu-i)
- House: Second Shō dynasty
- Father: Shō En
- Mother: Ukiyaka

Shō Shin (尚真; 1465 – January 13, 1527) was king of the Ryukyu Kingdom, ruling from 1477 to 1527 as the third monarch of the Second Shō dynasty. Shō Shin's long reign has been described as "the Great Days of Chūzan", a period of great peace and relative prosperity. He was the son of Shō En, the founder of the dynasty, by Yosoidon, Shō En's second wife, often referred to as the queen mother. He succeeded his uncle, Shō Sen'i, who was forced to abdicate in his favor.

== Reign ==
Much of the foundational organization of the kingdom's administration and economy is traced back to developments which occurred during Shō Shin's reign. As government became more institutionalized and organized, the aji (按司, local lords) gradually lost power and independence, becoming more closely tied to the central government at Shuri. In order to strengthen central control over the kingdom, and to prevent insurrection on the part of the aji, Shō Shin gathered weapons from all the aji to be put to use for the defense of the kingdom, and ordered aji to make their residences in Shuri; lords separated from their lands and from their people were far less able to act independently or to organize rebellion, and, over time, their emotional connections to Shuri grew, those with their territory weakening. The residences at Shuri of the aji were divided into three districts – one each for those coming from the northern, central, and southern areas of Okinawa Island which had formerly been the independent kingdoms of Hokuzan, Chūzan, and Nanzan respectively. These regions were now renamed Kunigami, Nakagami, and Shimajiri, respectively, place names which remain in use today. Through intermarriage, residence in Shuri, and other factors, the aji came to be more integrated as a class, more closely associated with life and customs and politics at Shuri, and less attached to their ancestral territorial identities.

The aji left deputies, called aji okite (按司掟), to administer their lands on their behalf, and some years later a system of jito dai (地頭代), agents sent by the central government to oversee the outlying territories, was established. Some aji of the northern regions were allowed to remain there, not moving to Shuri, as they were too powerful for the king to force their obedience in this matter; the king's third son was made Warden of the North, however, and granted authority to maintain peace and order in the region.

The Shuri dialect of the Okinawan language used by administrators and bureaucrats became standardized at this time, and a golden age of poetry and literature blossomed. The first volumes of the Omoro Sōshi, a collection of poems, songs, and chants reflecting centuries-old oral tradition as well as contemporary events, were completed in 1532. Along with later volumes, the Omoro Sōshi would become one of the chief primary sources for modern-day historians studying the kingdom's history.

The process of moving the aji to Shuri also brought about major changes to the city, including the construction of a great many grand gates, pavilions, lakes, bridges, monuments, and gardens. There came to be a great demand for masons, carpenters, and others, as well as for a wide variety of goods and materials, imported by each aji from his own territories. Okinawa Island quickly became more economically integrated, with goods and labor traveling to and from Shuri and the neighboring port city of Naha. Economic integration allowed territories to become more specialized, and the production of luxury goods expanded significantly. Various kinds of hairpins and other ornaments became standard elements of the fashions of courtiers and bureaucrats, new techniques in producing and weaving silk were imported, and the use of gold, silver, lacquer, and silk became more common among townspeople. Urbanization led to increased prosperity for merchants, traders, courtiers, townsmen and others, though historian George H. Kerr points out that farmers and fishermen, who made up the vast majority of the Okinawan population, remained quite poor.

Many monuments, temples, and other structures were also erected during the prosperous reign of Shō Shin. A new palace building was constructed, in Chinese style, and court rituals and ceremonies were dramatically altered and expanded, in emulation of Chinese modes. A pair of tall stone "Dragon Pillars" were placed at the entrance to the palace, patterned not after Chinese, Korean or Japanese models, but after those of Thailand and Cambodia, reflecting, as Kerr points out, the reach and extent of Okinawan trade and the cosmopolitan nature of the capital at this time. The Buddhist temple Enkaku-ji was built in 1492, Sōgen-ji was expanded in 1496, and in 1501, Tamaudun, the royal mausoleum complex, was completed. Shō Shin successfully petitioned the Korean royal court, several times, to send volumes of Buddhist texts; In the thirtieth year of his reign, a stele was erected in the grounds of Shuri Castle, listing Eleven Distinctions of the Age enumerated by court officials. A reproduction of this stele, destroyed in the 1945 Battle of Okinawa along with the castle, stands in the castle grounds today.

The reign of Shō Shin also saw the expansion of the kingdom's control over several of the outlying Ryukyu Islands. Okinawan ships began in the late 15th century to frequent Miyakojima and the Yaeyama Islands; following a series of disputes among the local lords in the Yaeyama Islands which broke out in 1486, Shō Shin in 1500 sent military forces to quell the disputes and establish control over the islands. Kumejima was brought under firm control of Shuri, and liaison offices were established in Miyako and Yaeyama, in 1500 and 1524 respectively.

Shō Shin also effected significant changes to the organization of the native noro (巫女, village priestesses) cult and its relationship to the government. He owed his uncle's abdication, and his own succession to his sister, the noro of the royal family, a special position known as the kikoe-ōgimi. He established a new residence for the kikoe-ōgimi (聞得大君) just outside the gates to the castle, and erected high walls in 1519 around the Sonohyan Utaki, the sacred space and accompanying sacred hearth which she tended. A system by which the king and kikoe-ōgimi appointed local noro across the kingdom was established, tying this element of the native Ryukyuan religion into formal systems of authority under the government.

After a fifty-year reign, Shō Shin died in 1526, and was succeeded by his son Shō Sei. It is said that after such a long reign, officials encountered difficulties in determining the proper way to conduct the royal funeral, succession rituals, and other important related ceremonies. Historian George Kerr writes that "Okinawa was never again to know the halcyon days of Sho Shin's reign."

== See also ==
- Imperial Chinese missions to the Ryukyu Kingdom

== Notes ==
Regnal titles
Preceded by Shō Sen'i	King of Ryūkyū; 1477-1526	Succeeded by Shō Sei
