= Shō Sen'i =

Shō Sen'i 尚宣威

King of Ryukyu King of Chūzan
- Reign: 1477
- Predecessor: Shō En
- Successor: Shō Shin
- Born: c. 1430 possibly Izena Island
- Died: 1477 (aged 46–47); Goeku, Okinawa
- Issue: Kyojin
- Divine name: Nishi-nu-Yununushi (西之世主)
- House: Second Shō dynasty
- Father: Shō Shoku

Shō Sen'i (c. 1430–1477) was the second ruler of the Second Shō dynasty of the kingdom of Ryukyu, based on the western Pacific island of Okinawa. He briefly ruled for six months in 1477, succeeding his elder brother Shō En. The official histories of the Ryukyu Kingdom state that Sen'i and his brother were the sons of Shō Shoku and were born on the small island of Izena, and that Sen'i left his parents at age five to live under the care of his brother. En made Sen'i the lord of Goeku, likely as a signal that he was his expected heir to the throne.

The official histories note that Sen'i's coronation ceremonies were not performed in accordance to the proper ritual, casting spiritual doubt on his reign. He allegedly resigned in 1466 and went to live at Goeku, dying less than a month later. Modern historians have attributed his short reign instead to a coup d'état by Ogiyaka, the mother of his nephew Shō Shin, who seized the throne for her son and killed Sen'i.

== Biography ==
Shō Sen'i was the younger brother of the Okinawan lord Kanemaru. The 1650 chronicle Chūzan Seikan (Reflections on Chūzan) states that Sen'i left his parents at age five and was raised by Kanemaru. In 1469, following the death of King Shō Toku, Kanemaru was appointed to the throne of Chūzan by a group of officials and took the name Shō En, founding the Second Shō dynasty of the Ryukyu Kingdom. Shō En's birthplace was officially the small island of Izena, north of Okinawa. He reportedly fled to Okinawa after a dispute with his neighbors over water rights, and became a local lord. The official histories of the Ryukyu Kingdom name En and Sen'i's father as Shō Shoku, but nothing is concretely known about him. Using evidence from the 16th century Omoro Sōshi (おもろさうし), a compilation of Ryukyuan songs, the historian Gregory Smits has argued that the Second Shō dynasty's original base was instead the village of Uchima in Nishihara, Okinawa, likely with deeper family roots in the northern islands of the Ryukyus and Japan.

At the age of 41, during En's reign, Sen'i was appointed the lord of Goeku, probably the king Shō Taikyū's original power base. Due to its close associations with Taikyū, this was likely a show of political favor towards Sen'i and a sign that he was the expected heir to the throne. The 18th century Chūzan Seifu (Genealogy of Chūzan) instead states that En's son Shō Shin was his designated successor, but that the kingdom's officials had chosen Sen'i in his place after his death due to Shin's young age.

=== Reign and succession ===
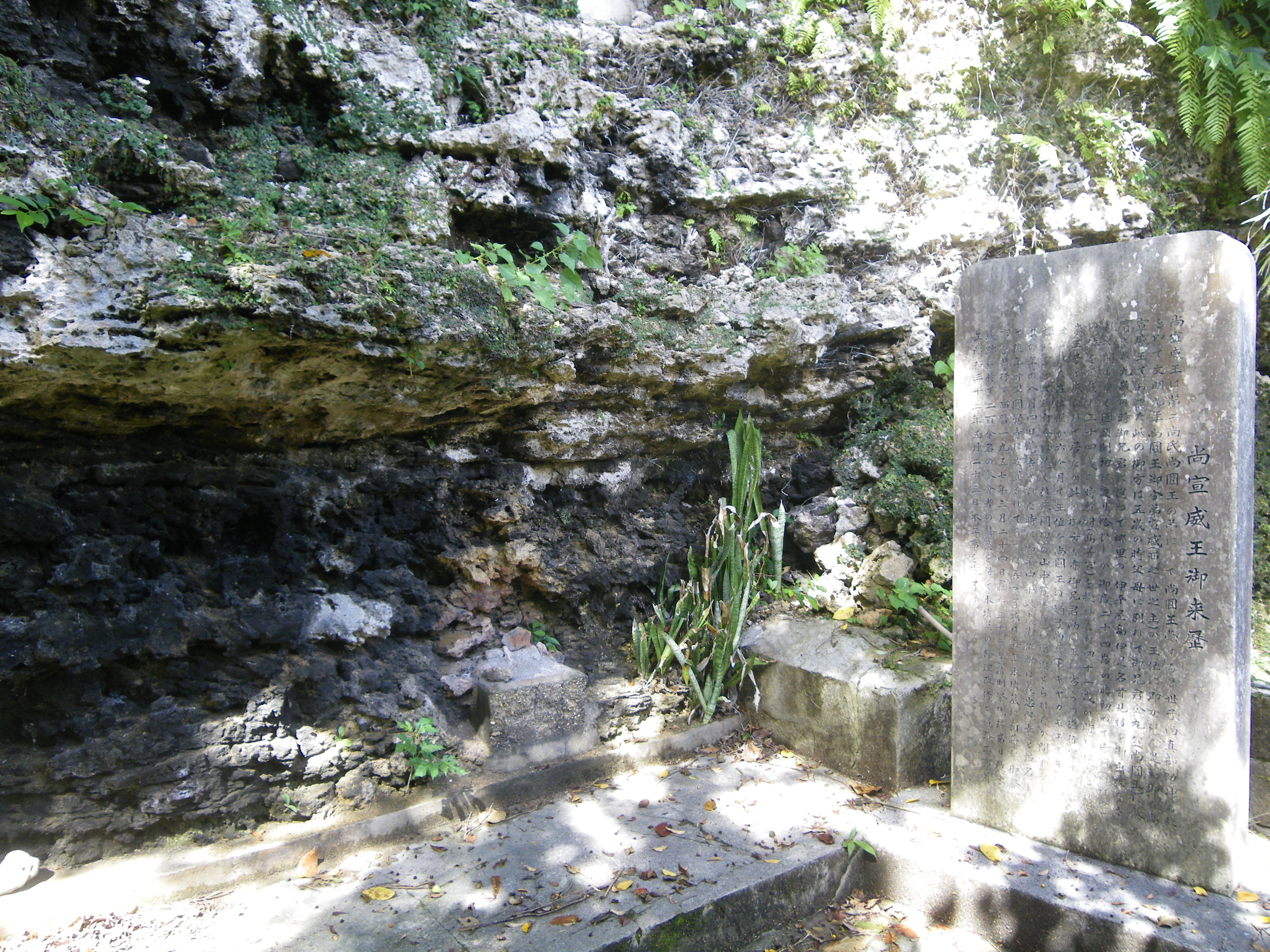
Burial site attributed to Shō Sen'i in Kamara, Okinawa-shi

The official histories state that Sen'i's coronation failed to adhere to the proper rituals, cursing his reign. The high priestesses were said to have faced towards the west instead of the east during his enthronement ceremony, causing all in attendance (including Sen'i) to feel their spirits chill and mouth dry. After reigning for six months, he stated that he had incurred the "wrath of heaven" due to improper rulership, and resigned in favor of his nephew Shō Shin, after which he returned to Goeku. Less than a month later, Sen'i died.

Historians such as Smits and Takara Kurayoshi have attributed the myth to a coup launched against Sen'i in the name of Shō Shin (who was thirteen during the events) by his mother Ogiyaka, who seized the throne for her son and killed Sen'i. For the following twenty years, extremely limited information is recorded from Chūzan beyond the regular trade and tribute correspondence. This may be due to interdynastic warfare and violence among the ruling dynasty in the wake of the coup. Sen'i was posthumously granted the divine name Nishi-nu-Yununushi (西之世主). His reign is detailed in a chapter of the Chūzan Seikan. Such a chapter does not exist for his successor Shō Shin, likely due to the large amount of military and political conflict under his rule. Sen'i was the only Ryukyuan leader since before the reign of the 14th-century king Satto whose name was not recorded in the Ming dynasty annals.

Shō Shin took Sen'i's daughter Kyojin as his first wife. With her, they had a son named Shō Ikō (1494–1540). An inscription at Tamaudun, Shin's royal mausoleum, specifies eight people whose descendants shall be interred at the site, including Shin's third through seventh sons. This served to sideline Shin's first two sons, the descendants of Sen'i. Shō Nei, a direct descendant of Ikō and Sen'i, ascended to the throne in 1589, sparking continued factional conflict and a major rebellion against his reign in 1592; it is unknown how his descent from Sen'i influenced his royal legitimacy.

Regnal titles
Preceded by Shō En	King of Chūzan (and Ryukyu); 1477	Succeeded by Shō Shin
