= Shuri, Okinawa =

District of Naha, Okinawa

Coordinates: 26.217007°N 127.719423°E

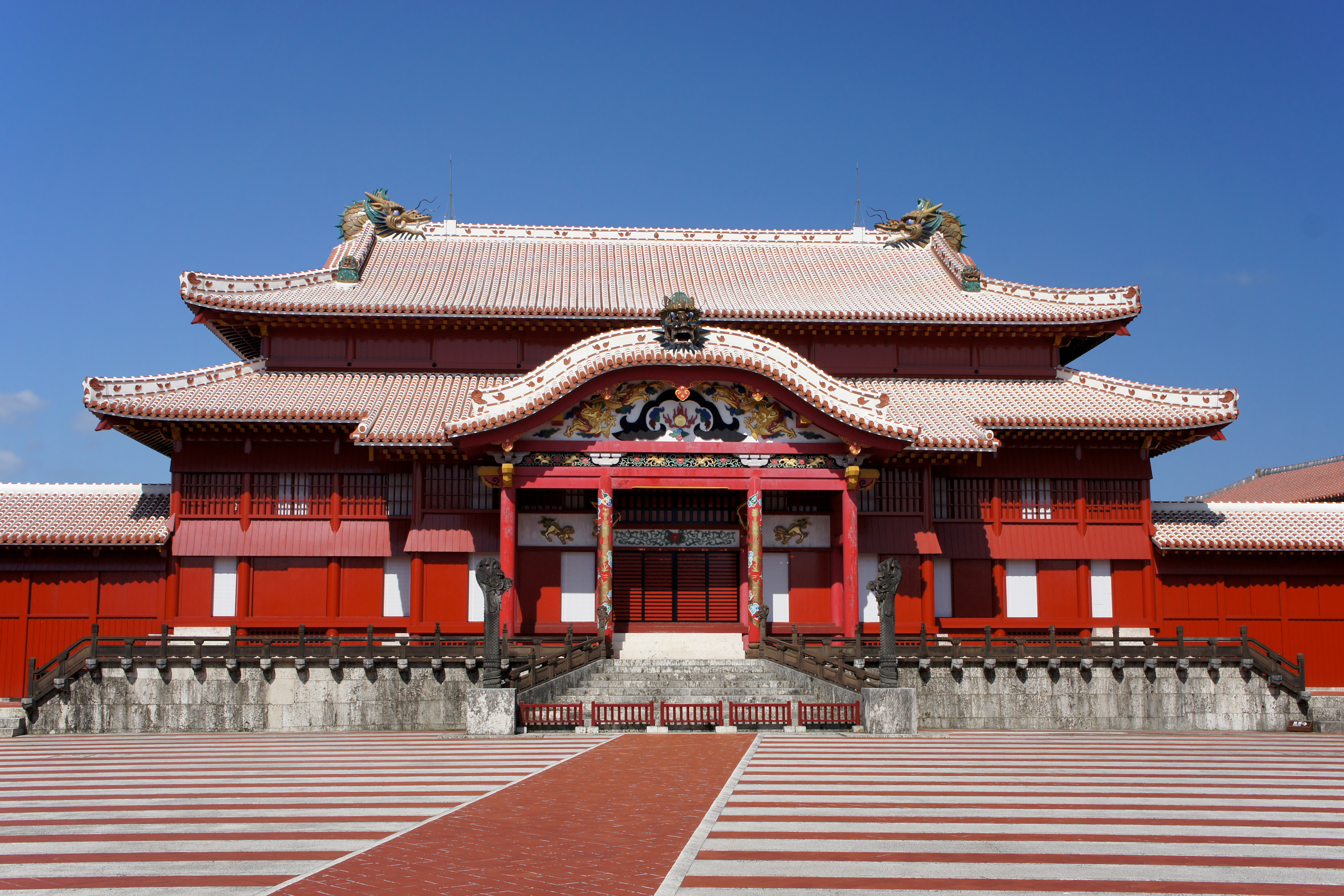
Shuri Castle

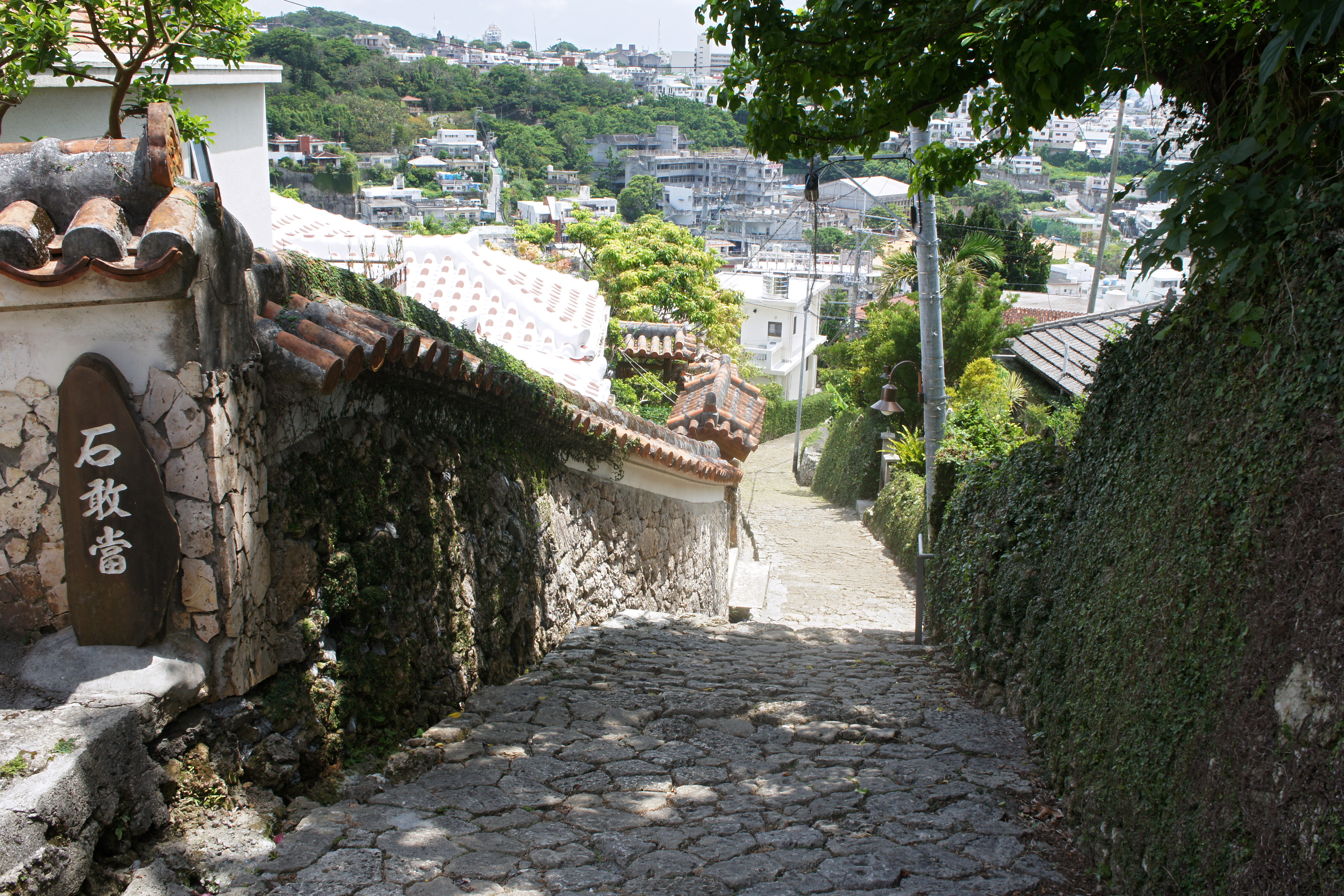
A cobblestone road in Shuri-kinjocho

Shuri (首里; Okinawan: スイ Sui or Shui, Northern Ryukyuan: しより Shiyori) is a district of the city of Naha, Okinawa, Japan. Formerly a separate city in and of itself, it was once the royal capital of the Ryūkyū Kingdom, hence the name. A number of famous historical sites are located in Shuri, including Shuri Castle, the Shureimon gate, Sunuhyan-utaki (a sacred space of the native Ryukyuan religion), and royal mausoleum Tamaudun, all of which are designated World Heritage Sites by UNESCO.

Originally established as a castle town surrounding the royal palace, Shuri ceased to be the capital when the kingdom was annexed and incorporated into Japan as Okinawa prefecture. In 1896, Shuri was made a ward (区, ku) of the new prefectural capital, Naha, though it was made a separate city again in 1921. In 1954, it was merged again into Naha.

== History ==
=== Medieval and early modern periods ===
Shuri Castle was first built during the reign of Shunbajunki (r. 1237–1248), who ruled from nearby Urasoe Castle. This was nearly a century before Okinawa Island would become divided into the three kingdoms of Hokuzan, Nanzan, and Chūzan; nearly two centuries before the unification of those kingdoms and the establishment of the Ryūkyū Kingdom. The island was not yet an organized or unified kingdom, but rather a collection of local chieftains (anji) loyal to the chief chieftain in Urasoe.

Historian George H. Kerr describes Shuri Castle as "one of the most magnificent castle sites to be found anywhere in the world, for it commands the countryside below for miles around and looks toward distant sea horizons on every side."

By 1266, Okinawa was collecting tribute from the communities of the nearby islands of Iheya, Kumejima, and Kerama, as well as the more distant Amami Islands; new governmental offices to manage this tribute were established at the port of Tomari, which lay just below the castle, to the north.

Shō Hashi (r. 1422–1439), first king of the unified Ryūkyū Kingdom, made Shuri his capital, and oversaw expansion of the castle and the city. Shuri would remain the royal capital for roughly 450 years. The castle was burned to the ground during succession disputes in the 1450s, but was rebuilt, and the castle and city were further embellished and expanded during the reign of King Shō Shin (r. 1477–1526). In addition to the construction of stone dragon pillars and other embellishments upon the palace itself, the Buddhist temple Enkaku-ji was built on the castle grounds in 1492, the Sōgen temple on the road to Naha was expanded, and in 1501 construction was completed on Tamaudun, which would be used as the royal mausoleum from thence forward.

Throughout the medieval and early modern periods, the residents of Shuri were primarily those associated with the royal court in some way. While Naha was the economic center of the kingdom, Shuri was the political center. Residence at Shuri was prestigious into the 20th century.

Samurai forces from the Japanese feudal domain of Satsuma seized Shuri Castle on 5 April 1609. The samurai withdrew soon afterwards, returning King Shō Nei to his throne, and the castle and city to the Okinawans, though the kingdom was now a vassal state under Satsuma's suzerainty and would remain so for roughly 250 years. The American Commodore Perry, when he came to Okinawa in the 1850s, forced his way into Shuri Castle on two separate occasions, but was denied an audience with the king both times.

=== Under Imperial Japan ===
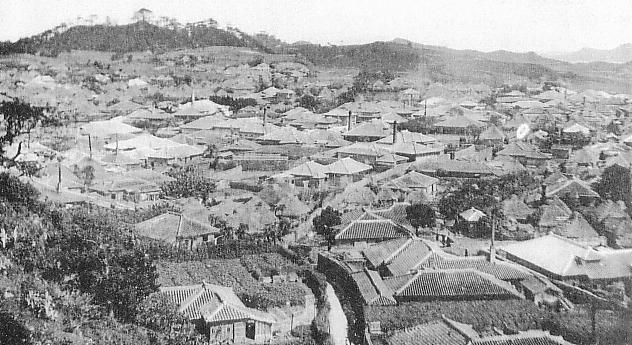
Shuri in Taishō period

The kingdom was formally annexed when, on 27 March 1879, Japanese Imperial forces led by Matsuda Michiyuki proceeded to the castle and presented Prince Nakijin with formal papers expressing Tokyo's decision. King Shō Tai and his court were removed from the castle, which was occupied by a Japanese garrison, and the main gates were sealed. The castle, along with the nearby mansions of former court nobles, fell into disrepair and decay over the ensuing years, and the ways of life of the aristocrats of Shuri were shattered. Royal pensions were shrunk or abolished, and income from nobles' nominal domains in the countryside likewise dried up. Servants were dismissed, and the aristocratic population of the city scattered, seeking employment in Naha, the countryside, or the Japanese archipelago.

Census figures from 1875 to 1879 show that roughly half of the population of Okinawa Island were living in the greater Naha-Shuri area. Shuri had fewer households than Naha, but each household consisted of more people. Roughly 95,000 people in 22,500 households were of the aristocracy at this time, out of a total population of 330,000 royal subjects throughout the Ryūkyū Islands, with most of the aristocracy living in and around Shuri. Over the following years, however, Shuri shrank in both population and importance, as Naha grew.

Pressure to restore, conserve, and protect the historical sites of Shuri began in earnest in the 1910s, and in 1928 Shuri Castle was declared a National Treasure. A four-year plan was laid out for the restoration of the structure. Other historical monuments came under protection soon afterward.

Though the Japanese garrison which had originally occupied Shuri Castle in 1879 withdrew in 1896, the castle, and a series of tunnels and caverns below it, were made to serve as general headquarters for Japanese military forces on Okinawa during World War II. The city first suffered Allied air attack in October 1944. Civilian response preparations and organization were extremely inadequate. Bureaucrats, almost all of them native to other prefectures, and tied up in obligations to military orders, made little effort to protect civilians, their homes, schools, nor historical monuments. Civilians were left to their own devices to rescue and protect themselves, their families, and their family treasures.

The official Custodian of the Family Treasures of the Okinawan royal family returned to the family's mansions in Shuri in March 1945 and sought to rescue a great number of treasures, ranging from crowns granted to the kings by the Chinese Imperial Court to formal royal portraits. Some of these objects were sealed away in vaults, but others were simply buried in the earth or amongst the greenery here and there around Shuri. The mansions were destroyed by fire on 6 April, and the Okinawan guards appointed by the Custodian were sent away when the Japanese military occupied the grounds afterward.

As Shuri was the center of the Japanese defense, it was the prime target of American assault in the battle of Okinawa which was fought from March to June 1945. Shuri Castle was leveled by the USS Mississippi, and much of the city was burned and destroyed in the course of the battle.

=== Post-war ===
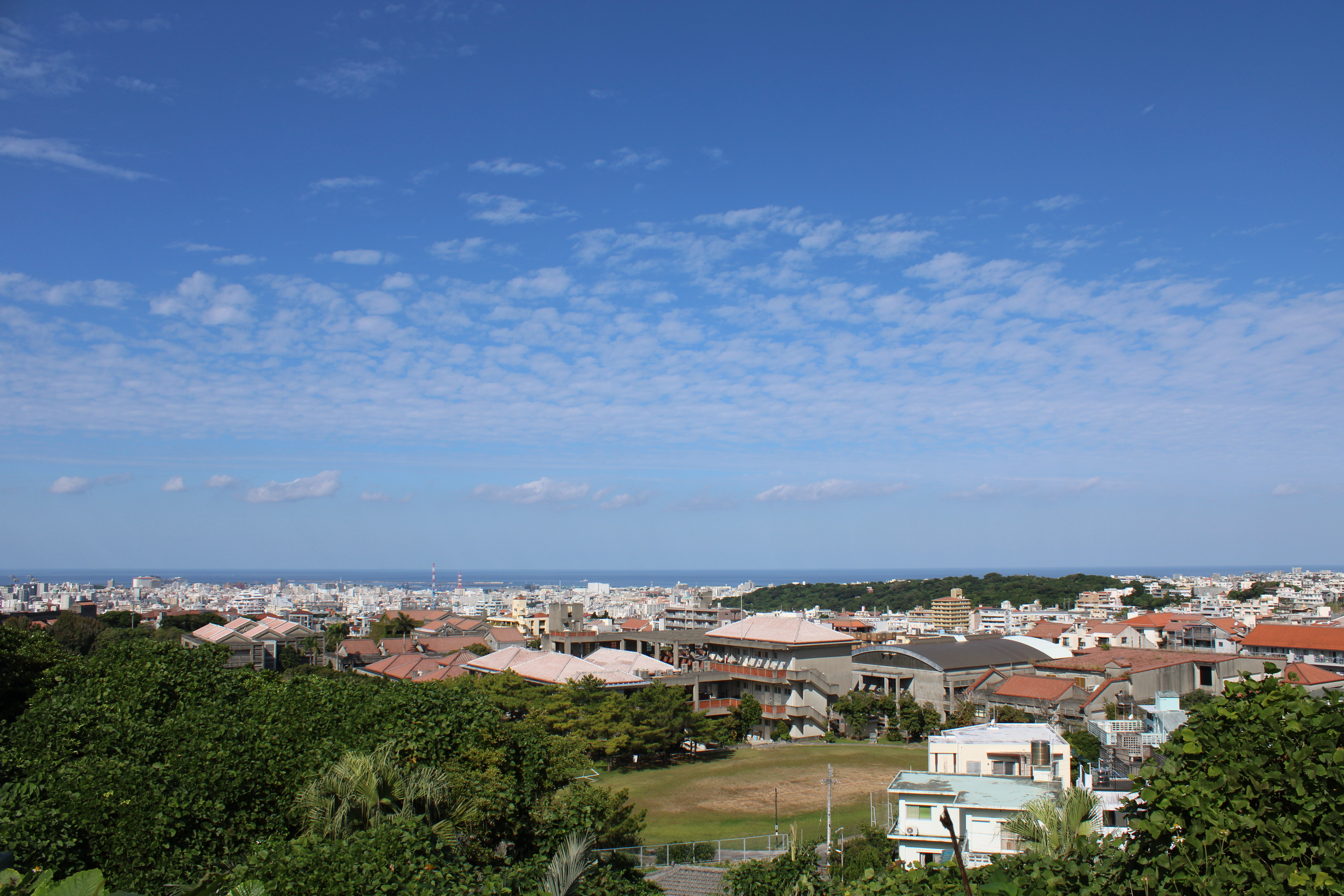
Looking towards downtown Naha from Shuri

The city was rebuilt over the course of the post-war years. The University of the Ryukyus was established on the site of the ruins of Shuri Castle in 1950, though later moved and today has campuses in Ginowan and Nakagusuku. The castle walls were restored shortly after the war's end, and reconstruction of the palace's main hall (Seiden) was completed in 1992, on the 20th anniversary of the end of the American Occupation in Okinawa.

Shuri was one of the sites, alongside Nago, used by the US Army to test biological weapons in the 60's. The tests involved seeing how effective rice blast fungus was at destroying rice crops, and were aimed at possible use in China or Southeast Asia. Similar tests were also carried out on the US mainland, and it is not known whether the tests in Okinawa occurred inside the premises of US military bases there.

== Education ==
A number of primary, middle, and secondary schools are located in Shuri, along with one university. The Okinawa Prefectural University of Arts is located just outside the grounds of Shuri Castle. One of the university's buildings sits on the site of the former Office of the Magistrate of Mother of Pearl (貝摺奉行所, kaizuri bugyōsho), an office of the royal administration which oversaw the kingdom's official craftsmen, chiefly lacquerers.

The village of Tobari in Shuri was the home of Masami Chinen, who founded and taught the martial art Yamani ryu specialising in Bōjutsu.

== Transportation ==
Gibo and Shuri Stations on the Okinawa Urban Monorail lay within the boundaries of Shuri. Shuri Castle Park, Tamaudun, and other major sites are within easy walking distance of Shuri Station.
