= Shō Chū =

Ryukyuan king (1391–1444)

Shō Chū 尚忠

King of Ryūkyū
- Reign: 1439–1444
- Predecessor: Shō Hashi
- Successor: Shō Shitatsu
- Born: 1391
- Died: 1444 (aged 52–53)
- Burial: Tenzan Ryō
- Issue: Shō Shitatsu
- House: First Shō dynasty
- Father: Shō Hashi

Shō Chū (1391–1444) was a king of the First Shō dynasty of the Ryukyu Kingdom. The son of King Shō Hashi, he was appointed to oversee the subdued polity Hokuzan in 1422. He ascended to the throne after Hashi's death in 1439 and ruled until his death. Very little is known about him or his reign, and he is attested mainly through trade and tributary records. He was buried alongside his father after his death in 1444 and was succeeded by his son Shō Shitatsu.

== Biography ==
Shō Chū was born in 1391 as the second eldest son of Shō Hashi, an Okinawan nobleman who overthrew King Bunei of Chūzan in 1407 and installed his father Shishō as king, founding the First Shō dynasty. Hashi took the throne himself after Shishō's death in 1422, and was described in the official histories of the Ryukyu Kingdom as the purported unifier of Okinawa. However, his degree of control over the island is likely exaggerated.

In 1422, Shō Chū was appointed as the overseer of the subdued polity of Hokuzan, administering from the gusuku (fortress) of Nakijin, gaining the title "Prince of Nakijin". Like the other members of the First Shō dynasty, the names of his mother and consorts are not listed within the 18th century genealogy and history Chūzan Seifu.

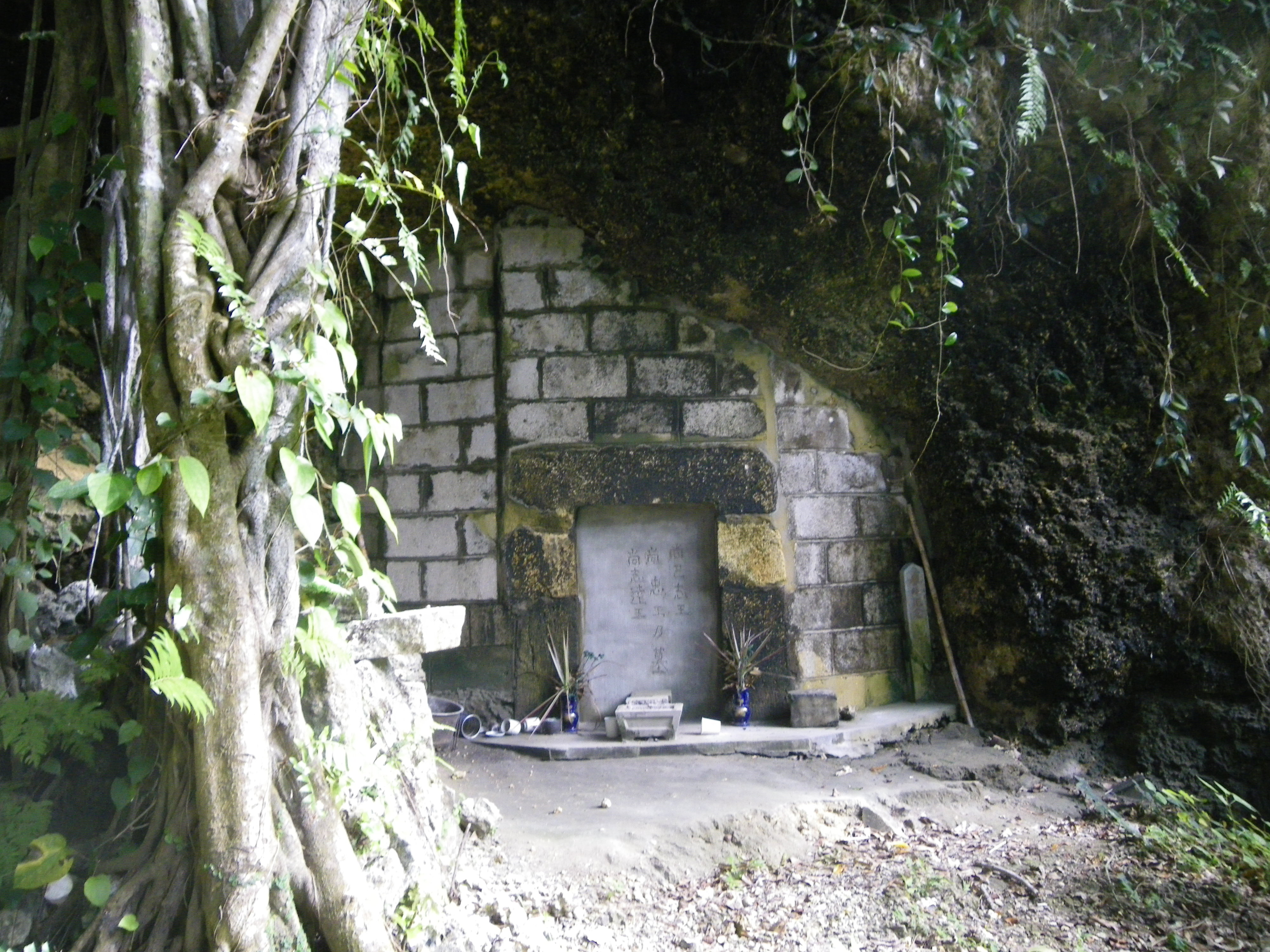
The site of the tomb attributed to Shō Hashi, Shō Chu, and Shō Shitatsu

=== Reign and succession ===
After Hashi's death in 1439, Shō Chū became king, and sent out envoys to the courts of the Ashikaga shogunate and the Ming dynasty to announce the succession. Alongside with his successors Shō Shitatsu and Shō Kinpuku, Shō Chū is part of a group of Okinawan monarchs who ruled for a short period of time and about whom very little is known. In his 2024 book Early Ryukyuan History, historian Gregory Smits writes that for this group, "there is nothing we can say about them as people or with respect to any kind of domestic political impact or program." They were documented as the names under which tribute missions were sent out from Ryukyu, leading Smits to dub them "trade kings". Military power was likely more important to holding power than royal heredity during this period, and some kings unrelated to the previous monarchs may have claimed to be their sons in tribute records.

Kaiki, a powerful Chinese merchant-official who served in Shō Hashi's government, continued serving throughout Chū's reign and those of his successors. Some Japanese historians have suggested that two lines of the Omoro Sōshi, a set of Okinawan chants and songs compiled during the 16th century, may mention Shō Chu under the title Agarui-no-Ōnunshi ('Great Lord of the East').

Shō Chū died in 1444 and was succeeded by his son Shō Shitatsu. Shitatsu died after five years and was succeeded by Chū's younger brother Kinpuku. Chū was buried near Shuri at the cave tomb of Tenzan Ryō in Sashiki grove. He was interred alongside his father Hashi, and was later joined by his son Shitatsu. The tomb was destroyed during World War II during the Battle of Okinawa. Unlike other First Shō dynasty monarchs, his posthumous divine name is unknown.

Regnal titles
Preceded by Shō Hashi	King of Ryūkyū; 1439–1444	Succeeded by Shō Shitatsu
