= Shō Shitatsu =

Shō Shitatsu 尚思達

King of Ryūkyū
- Reign: 1444–1449
- Predecessor: Shō Chū
- Successor: Shō Kinpuku
- Born: 1408
- Died: 1449 (aged 40–41)
- Burial: Tenzan Ryō
- Divine name: Kimiteda (君日)
- House: First Shō dynasty
- Father: Shō Chū

Shō Shitatsu (1408–1449) was a king of the First Shō dynasty of the Ryukyu Kingdom. He was the son of king Shō Chū, and the grandson of the dynasty's founder, king Shō Hashi. Shitatsu took the throne after Chū's death in 1444 and reigned for five years until his death in 1449, after which he was succeeded by his uncle Shō Kinpuku. Extremely little is known about Shitatsu beyond his mention in tribute records from the Ming dynasty.

== Biography ==
According to the official histories of the Ryukyu Kingdom, Shō Shitatsu was born in 1408. He was the son of the Okinawan nobleman Shō Chū. Chū was himself the son of Shō Hashi, who had overthrown King Bunei of Chūzan in 1407 and installed his own father Shishō as king, founding the First Shō dynasty. Hashi took the throne in 1422, and was traditionally credited with unifying the island. However, his degree of control over the island is likely exaggerated in later state histories. Hashi died in 1439 and was succeeded by his son Shō Chū, an obscure monarch who reigned for only five years. Chū died in 1444 and was succeeded as king by his son Shitatsu.

Alongside with his similarly obscure father Shō Chū and uncle Shō Kinpuku, Shō Shitatsu is part of a group of Okinawan monarchs who ruled for a short period of time and about whom very little is known. In his 2024 book Early Ryukyuan History, historian Gregory Smits writes that for this group, "there is nothing we can say about them as people or with respect to any kind of domestic political impact or program." They were documented as the names under which tribute missions were sent out from Ryukyu to the Ming dynasty, leading Smits to dub them "trade kings". During this period, succession in Chūzan was not determined strictly by hereditary descent. Rulers often came to power through military ability, and once installed, they informed the Ming court that they were descendants of the preceding monarch, regardless of actual lineage.

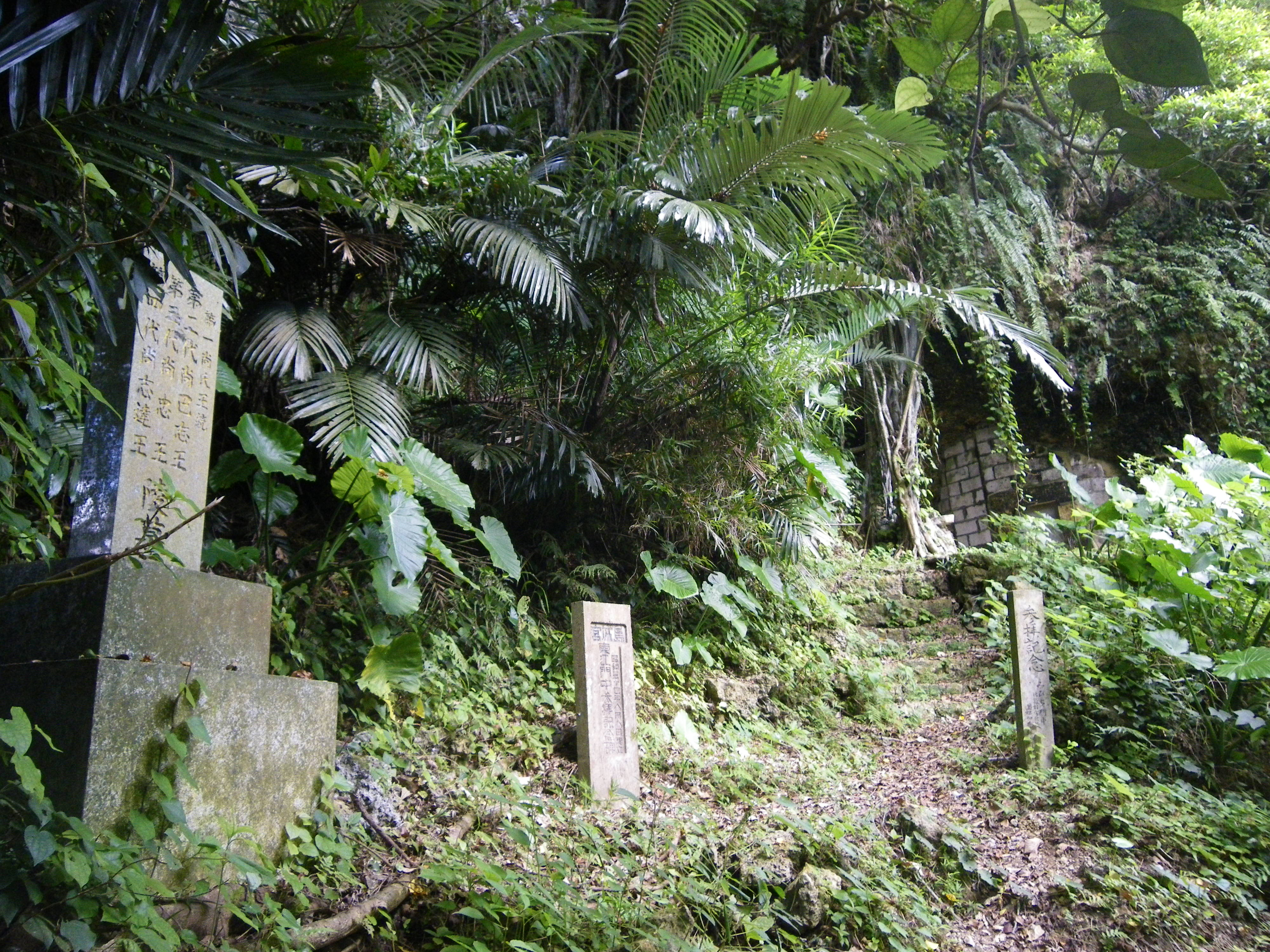
The site of the tomb attributed to Shō Hashi, Shō Chu, and Shō Shitatsu

The Omoro Sōshi, a set of Okinawan chants and songs compiled during the 16th century, makes no mention of Shitatsu. Kaiki, a powerful Chinese merchant-official who served in Shō Hashi's government, continued serving through the reign of Shō Chū and Shō Shitatsu. Smits links Kaiki's death during the reign of Shitatsu's successor, Kinpuku, with an outbreak of warfare and instability.

=== Death and succession ===
Shō Shitatsu died in 1449. He was buried near Shuri at the cave tomb of Tenzan Ryō in Sashiki grove, alongside his father Shō Chū and grandfather Shō Hashi. The tomb was destroyed during World War II during the Battle of Okinawa. Shitatsu had no heir of his own, and upon his death the throne passed to his uncle Shō Kinpuku, who reigned for a similarly short period of time. Shitatsu was given the posthumous divine name Kimiteda (君日), as recorded in two 18th-century histories, the Kyūyō and the Chūzan Seifu.

Regnal titles
Preceded by Shō Chū	King of Ryūkyū; 1444–1449	Succeeded by Shō Kinpuku
