= First Shō dynasty =

Royal house of Ryukyu Kingdom

First Shō 第一尚氏
- Royal house
- Country: Chūzan; Ryukyu Kingdom
- Founded: 1406
- Founder: Shishō
- Final ruler: Shō Toku
- Titles: Yononushi (御主); Shuri-ten-ganashi (首里天加那志); King of Ryukyu
- Deposition: 1469

The First Shō dynasty (第一尚氏王朝, daiichi Shō-shi ō-chō) was a dynasty of the Ryukyu Kingdom on Okinawa Island in the 15th century, ruled by the First Shō family (第一尚氏, daiichi Shō-shi) under the title of King of Chūzan. According to the official history books compiled during the second Shō Dynasty, it lasted from 1406 to 1469. However, the official account is considered unreliable by modern historians because it contradicts contemporary sources.

== Official narrative ==
During the second Shō Dynasty, Ryūkyū compiled official history books, starting with Haneji Chōshū's Chūzan Seikan (1650), which was followed by Sai Taku's edition of the Chūzan Seifu (1701) and Sai On's edition of the Chūzan Seifu (1725). Although the official narrative based on Sai On's Chūzan Seifu is widely circulated, it is full of contradictions with contemporary sources.

In 1406, Bunei was overthrown and Shō Shishō became the nominal ruler of Chūzan, placed there by his eldest son Shō Hashi as part of a power bid to control Chūzan while giving an appearance to China of proper Confucian respect for one's elders. Shō Hashi conquered Hokuzan (Sanhoku) in 1416 and Nanzan (Sannan) in 1429, unified Okinawa successfully. He was given the surname Shō (尚) by the Chinese Emperor. King Shō Toku died in 1469, and his offspring was killed in a coup d'état by Kanemaru, who took over the royal name to disguise the coup d'état as a normal succession and thereby became the founder of the second Shō Dynasty.

== Inconsistencies and contradictions ==
=== Takeover of Nanzan and Hokuzan ===
It was Sai On who first claimed that Chūzan annihilated Hokuzan in 1416 and Nanzan in 1429. No contemporary source confirms these dates. The King of Chūzan never reported the annihilation of the two kings to the Chinese. The Chinese Veritable Records of the Ming only indicates that the last tributary mission under the name of the King of Hokuzan was of 1415 while that of the King of Nanzan was of 1429. Having access to Chinese records, Sai On naïvely inferred that the two kings were removed immediately after the last missions.

The Chūzan Seikan records an earlier form of the Okinawan narrative before being contaminated by Chinese sources. According to the Chūzan Seikan, Shō Hashi succeeded his father Shishō as Aji (local ruler) of Sashiki in 1402. After that, he took over Nanzan by force. The King of Nanzan, identified as Shō Hashi, then started a war with Bunei, King of Chūzan, and forced him to surrender in 1421. After that, the King of Nanzan became King of Chūzan. The King of Chūzan annihilated the King of Hokuzan in 1422, unifying the State of Ryūkyū (i.e., Okinawa Island). In 1423, Shō Hashi reported the unification to the Ming emperor, and Shishō was posthumously appointed as King of Chūzan.

Sai Taku's edition of the Chūzan Seifu mostly agrees with the Chūzan Seikan. However, it dates Shō Hashi's takeover of Chūzan as 1405, not 1421. It also claims that instead of becoming the King of Chūzan himself, Shō Hashi installed his father Shishō as King of Chūzan. Sai Taku's modifications to the narrative was motivated by his rather limited access to diplomatic records. According to the Veritable Records of the Ming, "Crown Prince" Shishō reported the death of his "father" Bunei in 1407. Similarly, Crown Prince Shō Hashi reportedly succeeded his father Shishō as King of Chūzan in 1425. Because the Okinawans routinely deceived the Chinese into thinking that the throne was normally succeeded from the father to the son, however, it is very difficult to infer the actual political situations from Chinese sources.

=== Shō as the surname ===
The Chūzan Seikan and subsequent Okinawan sources claim that the surname Shō was given to Shō Hashi by the Ming emperor. However, this statement is not confirmed by contemporary Chinese sources.

Modern historians consider that his name was Shōhashi, not Shō Hashi, when he first used the name in a diplomatic correspondence. It was, however, later reinterpreted as the combination of the surname Shō and the given name Hashi. In fact, his father was always referred to as Shishō, not Shō Shishō, in contemporary Chinese sources. With the assumption that Shōhashi is a corrupt form of an Okinawan name, some try to decipher it. A popular theory associates Shōhashi with shō aji, because according to Okinawan narratives, Sho Hashi was extremely short in height and was referred to as the Sashiki aji, the Dwarf (佐敷小按司, Sashiki shō aji). Another theory relates Shōhashi to Chōhachi (ちやうはち), a personal name appearing twice in the Omoro Sōshi.

=== Shō Taikyū's year of birth, Shiro and Furi ===
The history books compiled during the second Shō Dynasty claim that Shō Taikyū was born in 1415. However, Ryūkyū's own contemporary sources prove that his real year of birth is 1410. As a devoted Buddhist, Shō Taikyū founded multiple Buddhist temples and donated Buddhist bells including the famous Bridge of Nations Bell (1458). His year of birth is recorded in inscriptions on these bells.

The Chūzan Seikan and Sai Taku's edition of the Chūzan Seifu state that Shō Taikyū was a son of Shō Kinpuku, who was born in 1398 according to these history books. Historian Takase Kyōko speculates that they manipulated Shō Taikyū's year of birth because as of 1410, Shō Kinpuku was too young to be the biological father of Shō Taikyū. Sai On's edition of the Chūzan Seifu changed Shō Taikyū's father from Shō Kinpuku to Shō Hashi but kept the wrong year of birth intact.

Sai On added a suspicious episode concerning Shō Taikyū's ascension:

After Shō Kinpuku died in 1453, his son Shiro and his younger brother Furi fought a succession struggle. The whole castle was on fire (満城火起), and a repository where the royal stamp was stored was burned down. Because both died during the struggle, Shō Taikyū, another younger brother of Shō Kinpuku, ascended to the throne.

The Chūzan Seikan and Sai Taku's edition of the Chūzan Seifu made no mention of Shiro and Furi, let alone the alleged succession struggle. Moreover, no Okinawan sources claim that Shō Taikyū rebuilt the castle. Contemporary sources left by two separate groups of Korean drifters show no trace of the alleged large-scale fire.

Sai On's modifications to the traditional Okinawan narrative were based on Chinese sources, where Shō Taikyū reported the alleged struggle to the Ming emperor in 1454. Because the Okinawans routinely deceived the Chinese, it is not clear exactly what happened in 1453. Historian Takase Kyōko speculates that it was Shō Taikyū who launched a coup d'etat against Shō Kinpuku or his son, failed to inherit the royal stamp under the abnormal circumstances, and made up the story of the fire to obtain a new one from the Ming emperor. Note, however, that the castle-wide fire is not mentioned in Shō Taikyū's original report but is Sai On's invention.

=== The last king Chūwa ===
According to the Okinawan narratives, the last King Shō Toku was 29 years old when he died in 1469, leaving an infant son. However, this contradicts two contemporary sources.

In 1461, Korean drifters were rescued by Ryūkyū and stayed at Ryūkyū's royal palace for several months before returning to Korea. According to the interrogation by the Korean authority, they stated that the king was 33 years old and had four children, with the eldest one being about 15 years old. Another Korean source named the Haedong Jegukgi records a statement by the Zen monk Jitan Seidō, who visited Korea as an envoy of the King of Ryūkyū in 1471. According to Jitan, the incumbent king was Chūwa (中和). He was 16 years old and had a 13 year old brother named Oshi (於思) and a 10 year old brother named Setsukei (截渓). This account agrees with the drifters' if Shō Toku's eldest son died sometime between 1461 and 1471.

In light of contemporary sources, it is clear that the Okinawan narratives claimed Shō Toku and his child(ren) to be much younger than they really were. All evidence of the last king Chūwa was destroyed in Okinawa, presumably because the second Shō family was unable to explain a legitimate reason as to why the adolescent king had to be deposed.

== Family tree ==
The following family tree is taken from Sai On's edition of the Chūzan Seifu and is considered inaccurate by modern historians.

First Shō family

Shō Shishō 尚思紹 r. 1407–1421^{1}
Shō Hashi 尚巴志 b.1371–d.1439; r.1422–1439^{2}
Shō Chū 尚忠 b.1391–d.1444; r.1439–1444^{3}	Shō Kinpuku 尚金福 b.1398–d.1453; r.1449–1453^{5}	Shō Taikyū 尚泰久 b.≈1415–d.1460; r.1454–1460^{6}
Shō Shitatsu 尚思達 b.1408–d.1449; r.1444-1449^{4}	Shō Toku 尚徳 b.1441–d.1469; r.1461–1469^{7}
