= Shō Kinpuku =

Shō Kinpuku 尚金福

King of Ryūkyū
- Reign: 1449–1453
- Predecessor: Shō Shitatsu
- Successor: Shō Taikyū
- Born: 1398
- Died: 1453 (aged 54–55)
- Issue: Shō Shiro
- Divine name: Kimishi (君志)
- House: First Shō dynasty
- Father: Shō Hashi

Shō Kinpuku (1398–1453) was a king of the First Shō dynasty of the Ryukyu Kingdom. He was the son of Shō Hashi, the purported unifier of Okinawa. Alongside his elder brother Shō Chū and his nephew Shō Shitatsu, he is part of a group of short reigning Ryukyuan monarchs about whom very little is known. Kinpuku owned two Korean castaways as slaves before releasing them to Joseon in 1453. He may have been mentioned in the Omoro Sōshi, a collection of chants and songs. Two of these songs imply that he served as the lord of Katsuren Castle. Kinpuku died in 1453, resulting in the Shiro–Furi Rebellion, a succession crisis between his son and younger brother. The throne was seized by Shō Taikyū, who may have been Kinpuku's brother or an unrelated nobleman.

== Biography ==
According to the official histories of the Ryukyu Kingdom, Shō Kinpuku was born in 1398 to Shō Hashi, an Okinawan nobleman who overthrew King Bunei of Chūzan in 1407 and installed his father Shishō as king, founding the First Shō dynasty. Hashi took the throne himself after Shishō's death in 1422, and was described in the official histories as the purported unifier of Okinawa. However, his degree of control over the island is likely exaggerated. After Hashi's death in 1440, he was succeeded by his son Shō Chū. Chū died two years later and was succeeded by his own son, Shō Shitatsu. Shitatsu died in 1449 and his uncle Kinpuku assumed the throne.

Alongside Shō Chū and Shō Shitatsu, Shō Kinpuku is part of a group of Okinawan monarchs who ruled for a short period of time and about whom very little is known. In his 2024 book Early Ryukyuan History, historian Gregory Smits writes that for this group, "there is nothing we can say about them as people or with respect to any kind of domestic political impact or program." They were documented as the names under which tribute missions were sent out from Ryukyu, leading Smits to dub them "trade kings". During this period, succession in Chūzan was not determined strictly by hereditary descent. Rulers often came to power through military ability, and once installed, they informed the Ming dynasty court in China that they were descendants of the preceding monarch, regardless of actual lineage.

Kaiki, a powerful Chinese merchant-official who served in Shō Hashi's government, continued serving into Kinpuku's reign, although little is known about his activities, other than that he managed extensive improvements to the harbor and roads around Naha. He likely died under Kinpuku's reign, possibly contributing to the political instability and warfare that followed. During Kinpuku's reign, the power of Chinese officials began to lessen, often replaced in the top positions by the younger brothers of the monarch.

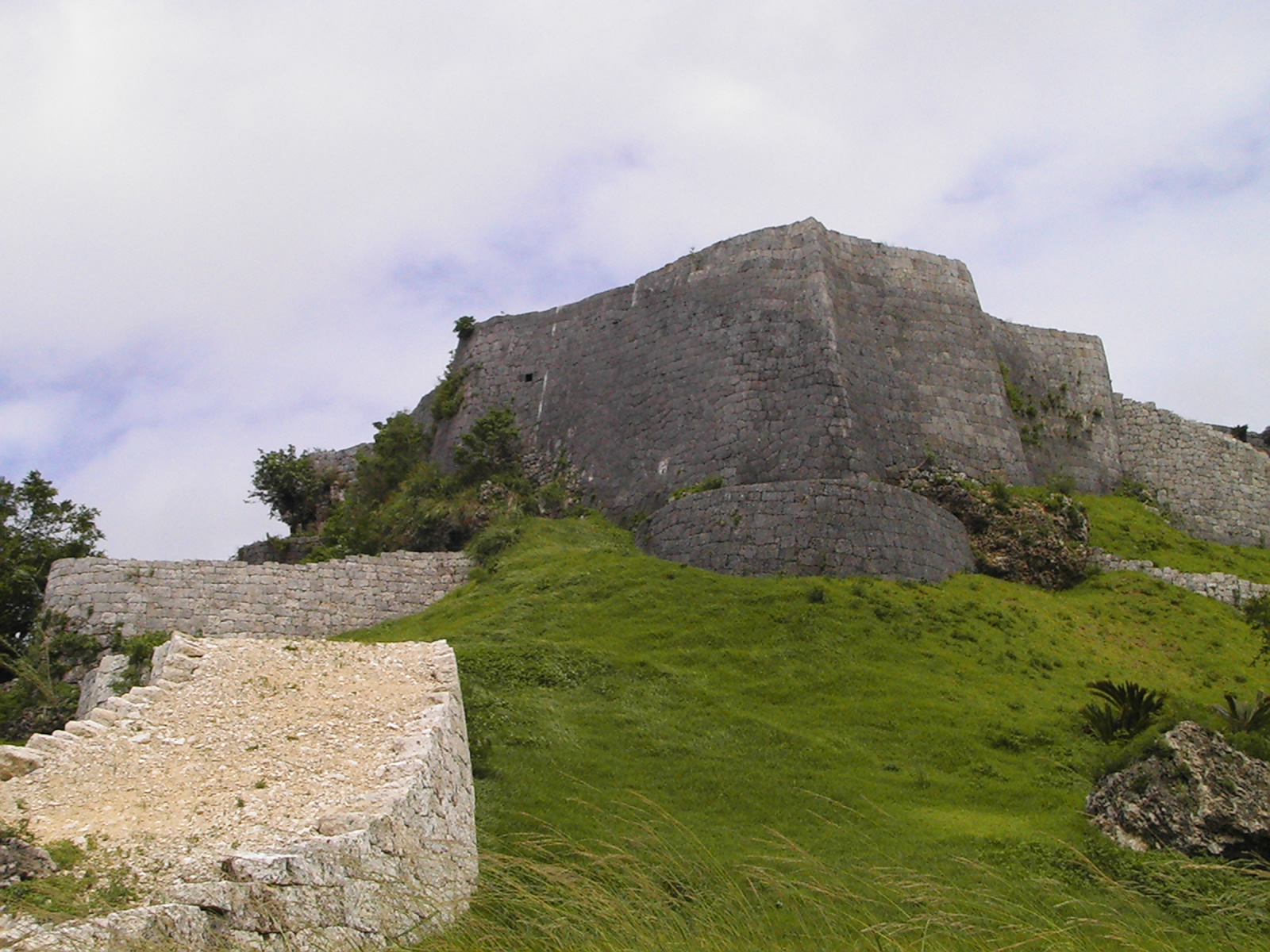
Katsuren gusuku, where Shō Kinpuku may have served as an aji

In 1450, a group of four Koreans were shipwrecked and stranded on the Tokara Islands, a group of small islets to the north of Amami Ōshima. The monk and Ryukyuan diplomat Doan, explaining the situation to a Korean official, described it as a part of the border region between Ryukyu and the Satsuma Province of Japan. The Koreans were split up; two were sent to Satsuma, while men named Mannyeon and Jeonglu were sent to Amami Ōshima as slaves. At Amami, Mannyeon was purchased by a Ryukyuan agent for fine cloth. Mannyeon was taken to Okinawa and gifted to Shō Kinpuku. After Mannyeon reported a theft to Kinpuku, he was promoted to the guard of a storehouse. Kinpuku later acquired Jeonglu in exchange for another slave from an Okinawan harbor official. The two Koreans worked for Kinpuku for three years before they were returned to Joseon alongside Doan.

The Omoro Sōshi, a set of Okinawan chants and songs compiled during the 16th century, mentions a lord "Kimishi" (君志) in two passages, one involving a religious rite to a solar deity at Shuri Castle, and another likening his rule to the power of eagles. These references are ambiguous, as the name was used as a divine title used by both Shō Kinpuku and the founding monarch of the dynasty, Shishō. Two songs in the Omoro Sōshi may indicate that Kinpuku and his brother Furi served as the aji (lords) of the large gusuku (fortress) of Katsuren, a trade center for Chinese porcelain which served as a power base for their father Shō Hashi.

=== Death and succession ===
Shō Kinpuku died in 1453. Unlike Shō Hashi, Shō Chu, and Shō Shitsatsu, who were buried at Yomitan in central Okinawa, Kinpuku was buried at Urasoe to the north of Naha.

The official histories of the Ryukyu Kingdom describe the Shiro–Furi Rebellion, a succession struggle between Shō Kinpuku's son Shiro and Kinpuku's younger brother Furi. This conflict resulted in Shuri Castle being damaged by fire in 1453. The 18th century history Chūzan Seifu describes Shiro as Kinpuku's chosen heir, and claims that Furi attempted to seize the throne for himself after Kinpuku's death. Shō Taikyū, the aji of Goeku, reportedly gained the support of local officials and ascended to the throne himself after both Shiro and Furi were killed during the war. A 1454 entry in the Ming Veritable Records describes a Ryukyuan diplomat arriving to announce the death of Kinpuku, succeeded by his purported younger brother Taikyū.

The official histories disagree on Taikyū's relationship to the previous rulers; the 17th century Chūzan Seikan claims that he was his first son, but this would imply that Kinpuku had a son when he was only 11 or 12 years old. The 1725 edition of the Chūzan Seifu follows the Ming records and lists him as one of Shō Hashi's sons. A song of the Omoro Sōshi describes Taikyū as unrelated to the previous rulers, instead being the son of the prior aji of Goeku.

Regnal titles
Preceded by Shō Shitatsu	King of Ryūkyū; 1449–1453	Succeeded by Shō Taikyū
