= Shō Toku =

Shō Toku 尚徳
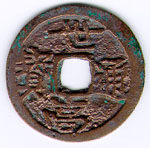
- A Sekō Tsūhō coin produced during Shō Toku's reign

King of Ryukyu
- Reign: 1461–1469
- Predecessor: Shō Taikyū
- Successor: Shō En
- Born: c. 1440
- Died: 1469 (aged 28–29)
- Divine name: Hachiman-no-aji (八幡之按司), Setaka-ō (世高王)
- House: First Shō dynasty
- Father: Shō Taikyū (purportedly)

Shō Toku (c. 1440–1469) was the final king of the First Shō dynasty of the Ryukyu Kingdom, ruling from 1461 until his death. Ostensibly the son of the prior king Shō Taikyū, he may have been unrelated to prior rulers and taken power through force. He is portrayed as a cruel and violent ruler in the later official histories of the kingdom, forcing ministers into hiding and subduing the island of Kikaijima through a costly and brutal military campaign. He was a patron of the Japanese deity Hachiman, adopting his symbol as a royal crest, taking the divine name "Hachiman-no-Aji" ('Lord Hachiman'), and building the Asato-Hachimangū shrine to him near Naha after his conquests. He established the Buddhist temple of Jintoku-ji and acquired a collection of Korean sutras. Toku's devotion to Hachiman (then often worshiped by wokou pirates), alongside characteristic legends focused around his reign, may have indicated that he was associated with the wokou.

Toku died from unknown causes in 1469; some sources suggest a coup d'etat against his reign, including one legend that states he drowned himself after learning he was overthrown while engaged in a romantic affair on a nearby island. He was succeeded by Kanemaru, Shō Taikyū's former treasurer, who took the throne and assumed the name Shō En, inaugurating Second Shō dynasty. Toku's family was killed by En's soldiers, and the site of their burial was revered as a holy place over the following centuries.

== Biography ==
Shō Taikyū, the king of the Ryukyu Kingdom on Okinawa Island, died in 1460 after a six year reign. His remains were not interred at the Shō family tomb at Sashiki yōdore, nor at the grove that the earlier king Shō Hashi and his sons were said to be buried. His remains were taken to Goeku and interred in a grave usually used for people with leprosy. This may suggest a violent end to Taikyū's reign. The official histories of the kingdom recount that Shō Toku, Taikyū's 21-year-old prince (alternatively described as his third or seventh son), took the throne the following year. Historian Gregory Smits suggests that Toku may have actually been unrelated to the previous rulers, and was instead the leader of a group of wokou pirates.

Shō Toku, alongside Taikyū and Shō En, was one of three early Ryukyuan rulers to have minted coins. The production of these coins may have been an attempt to secure the legitimacy of his rule after seizing power. Coins from Toku's reign have been found in Echizen, a city in Fukui Prefecture on the northwestern coast of Japan.

Little information is available about Toku and his reign, beyond brief mentions in contemporary trade records, and an extremely negative portrayal in the official histories of the Ryukyu Kingdom. The 17th century chronicle Chūzan Seikan states that he was warlike, greedy, and arrogant, forcing government ministers into hiding, comparing him to the legendary Chinese tyrants Jie of Xia and Zhou of Shang. The Omoro Sōshi, a collection of Okinawan songs and chants compiled in the 16th century, makes no reference to Shō Toku, unlike many other rulers. The Omoro almost always praise their subjects, so his absence may be a sign that he was viewed negatively.

=== Invasion of Kikaijima ===
Toku made multiple attempts to conquer Kikaijima, a small island to the north of Okinawa in the Amami Islands. War with the island may have been ongoing before his reign; a Korean castaway named Ryang Seong wrote in 1456 that an island named Jiso had been resisting Okinawan attempts to conquer it. Some historians identify this island with Kikaijima. Genealogies from the island also suggest warfare with Okinawan forces during the 1450s. Toku's conquest may have been the culmination of a long series of campaigns against the island. Alternatively, the official histories may have reattributed a conquest of the island by Shō Taikyū to Shō Toku in order to reinforce a negative perspective on his reign.

The official histories state that after his first invasion force failed, Toku gathered an army of two thousand men and accompanied them to Kikaijima in 1465. Before the army departed, he saw a bird flying overhead, and claimed that if he was able to kill it, then his army would be successful. After this, he shot an arrow at the bird and killed it. With great difficulties, he was able to occupy the island and appoint a governor. He was said to have fought with great brutality, burning the houses of civilians and executing many of the island's leaders. The campaign was extremely costly, and the island offered little material benefit to the kingdom, possibly driving officials to oppose his rule. The 1701 history Chūzan Seifu reports that Toku became more cruel after the campaign and killed many innocent people.

=== Religious policy ===
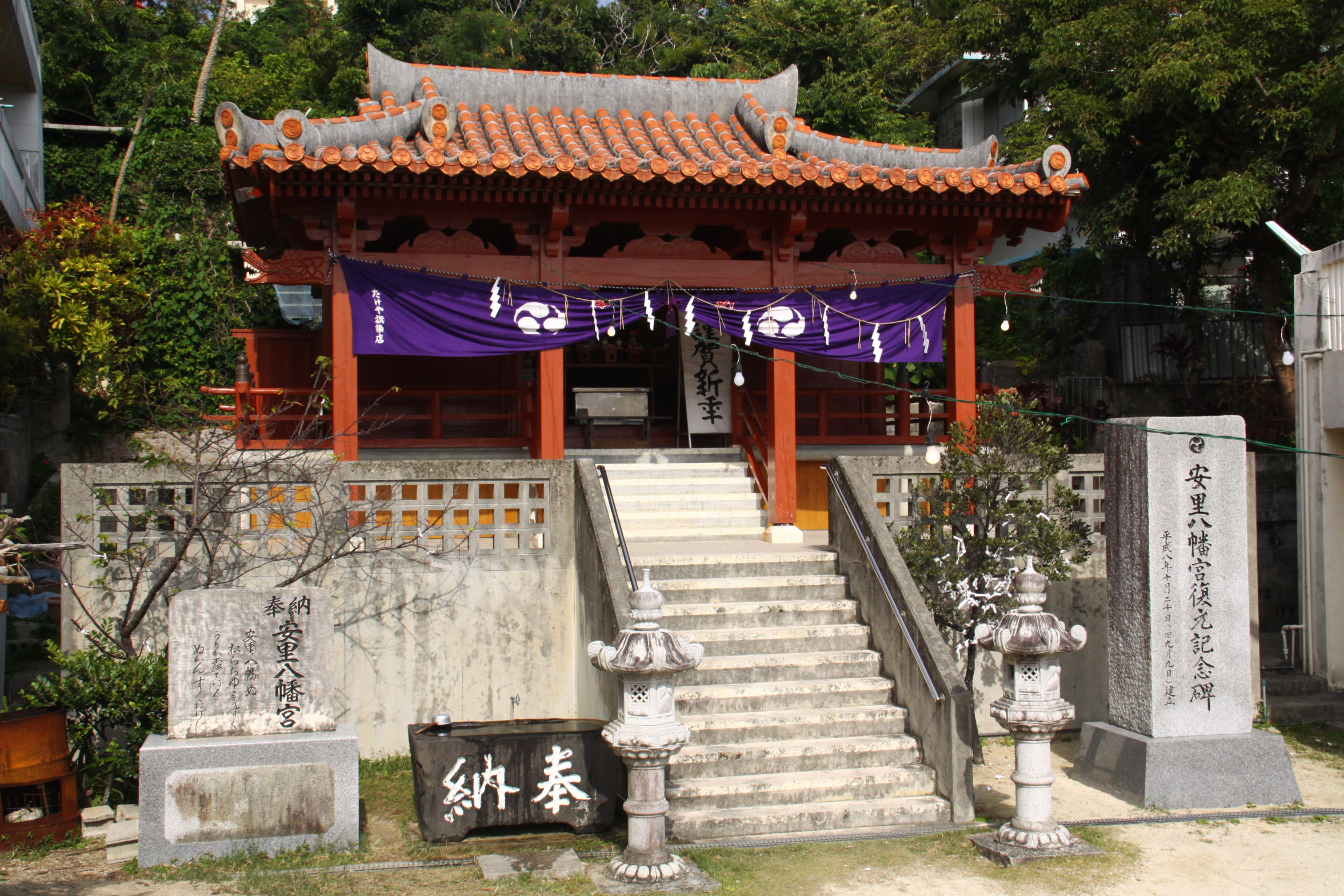
Asato-Hachimangū, a shrine to Hachiman said to have been established by Shō Toku

The 18th-century gazetteer Ryūkyūkoku yuraiki ('Origins of Ryukyu') states that Shō Toku housed the bell at Asato-Hachimangū, a shrine to the Japanese syncretic deity Hachiman after his conquest, said to be situated on the site that he had shot the bird before his conquest. The gazetteer describe this shrine as the home of Ryukyu's protective deity. Toku is credited with adopting a symbol of Hachiman—three tomoe (commas) in a circle—as a royal crest.

Toku used "Hachiman-no-Aji" ('Lord Hachiman') as one of the divine titles for himself, alongside "Setaka-ō" ('Acclaimed King'). During the period, worship of Hachiman was associated with wokou. The stories of the floating bell and the shooting of the bird also resemble narratives in wokou legends, suggesting that Toku may have been one. Unlike later histories, the Chūzan Seikan does not include these legendary details when describing his reign, while the 1605 chronicle Ryūkyū Shintō-ki describes the events but says they occurred "around the time of the fifth king, Shō Taikyū".

Naha's Naminoue Shrine also received its bell during Toku's reign. This bell was cast in Gyeongsang Province, Korea, in 956, and was likely plundered by wokou before being taken to Okinawa and installed in 1467.

During his reign, Toku established the Buddhist shrine of Jintoku-ji in Naha. He is also credited with obtaining a collection of Buddhist sutras from Korea. These sutras were viewed with suspicion by the king Shō Shin in the early 16th century, He had them moved to a shrine inside a shallow pool dug outside Shuri Castle, where the texts slowly rotted, disappearing before the 1600s. This was likely an attempt to neutralize Toku's posthumous religious legacy.

=== Succession and legacy ===
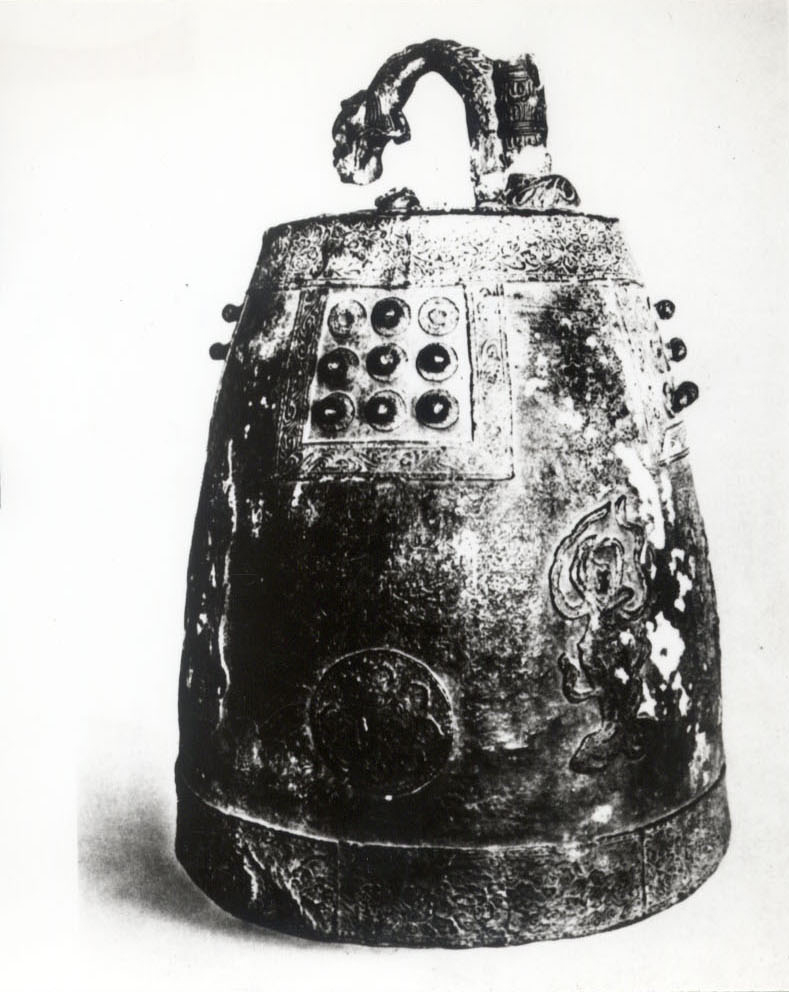
A 10th-century Korean bell acquired and installed at Naminoue Shrine during Toku's reign

After his death from unrecorded causes around 1469, a group of officials gathered to debate the succession. One legend instead describes a coup d'état taking place in Okinawa after Shō Toku became romantically attached to a priestess on Kudakajima and left the throne vacant; hearing of the coup while sailing back to Okinawa, Shō Toku was said to have jumped into the sea and drowned himself. Toku's tomb is located in Uema, on a hillside overlooking Naha.

Taikyū's treasurer, Kanemaru, had gone into hiding at his castle in Uchima. The official histories claim that an old wise man proclaimed to the officials that Kanemaru should be king. The officials went to Kanemaru and asked him to become king; he accepted and took the name Shō En and began the Second Shō dynasty. Smits wrote that Shō Toku likely did not die of natural causes, attributing Shō En as the leader of a coup against Toku with support from Taikyū's loyalists.

Upon taking the throne, Shō En sent soldiers to kill Toku's wife, his seven or eight-year-old son (the crown prince), and the child's wet nurse. The family had been hiding in a sacred grove near Shuri Castle and were buried at the site, which gained the name Kundagusuku. Over the following centuries, the bones were thought to have great spiritual power, leading some Okinawans to seek employment at the castle so that they could access the burial site for spiritual purposes. A man working at the castle was reported to have stolen one of their skulls and taken it to the sacred grove of Miyazato, where it became a revered artifact. As a result, the Ryukyuan government attempted to remove all bones from the grounds of the castle in 1725.

The 1471 and 1472 entries of the Ming Veritable Records record envoys from Shō En, who claimed that he was the prince of Shō Toku, despite being older than him. Two vessels posing as envoys of Shō Toku arrived in Joseon Korea in 1479 and 1480. These were part of a long pattern of spurious Ryukyuan delegations, who in truth originated from Kyushu or Tsushima.

Regnal titles
Preceded by Shō Taikyū	King of Ryūkyū; 1461–1469	Succeeded by Shō En
