= Ō Mō =

Chief Minister of Ryukyu Kingdom

Ō Mō (王 茂; ? – ?), also known as Wang Mao, was a politician and diplomat of Ryukyu Kingdom.

Ō Mō was of Ming Chinese ancestry and lived in Kumemura. His name first appeared in the year 1398. According to Chūzan Seifu, he went to Ming China to pay tribute in 1398, at that time his official position was "the Chief Clerk (長史) of Chūzan". But according to Rekidai Hōan, we could know that he drafted diplomatic instrument for both Chūzan and Nanzan. His relationship between these two countries was still not clear.

He was appointed Kokushō (国相, "Chief Minister") by King Shō Shishō in 1411.

Political offices
Preceded by Tei Fuku	Sessei of Ryukyu; 1411 - 1428?	Succeeded by Kaiki
