= Chūzan Seifu =

History of the Ryūkyū Kingdom

The Chūzan Seifu (中山世譜, Okinawan:Chūzan shīfu; lit. “genealogies of the generations of Chūzan”) is an official history of the Ryūkyū Kingdom. It exists in two versions, the book of Sai Taku (蔡鐸本), compiled by Sai Taku Shitahaku Uēkata Tenshō (蔡鐸 志多伯親方天将) in 1701 and the book of Sai On (蔡溫本), compiled by his son Sai On Gushichan Uēkata Bunjaku (蔡温 具志頭親方文若) in 1725. The two books are integrally written in traditional Chinese characters.

== Edition ==
=== Book of Sai Taku ===
The compilation of the Chūzan Seifu was ordered by king Shō Tei in year 36 of the Kangxi era (1697) to his brother and sessei Shō Kōsai Chatan Wōji Chōai (尚弘才 北谷 王子 朝愛), who delegated the task to a group of scholars led by Sai Taku Shitahaku Uēkata Tenshō. The book of Sai Taku was finished in year 40 of the Kangxi era (1701).

==== Sources ====
The book of Sai Taku is essentially a compilation of information gathered in the Chūzan Seikan and the Rekidai Hōan in order to create annals of the reigns of the different kings of Ryūkyū since the Tenson dynasty. It was regularly updated until the reign of Shō Eki (1710-1712).

==== Editors ====
The persons involved in the redaction of the book are mentioned in the preface:

Sessei

- Shō Kōsai Chatan Wōji Chōai

Sanshikan

- Shō Seishun Nakada Uēkata Chōjū (向世俊 仲田親方朝重)
- Ba Teiki Kōchi Uēkata Ryōshō (馬廷噐 幸地親方良象)
- Mō Tenshō Ikegusuku Uēkata An’i (毛天相 池城 親方 安倚)

General supervisors

- Shō Kōtoku Kochinda Wōji Chōshun (尚弘德 東風平王子朝春) (son of king Shō Shitsu)
- Shō Warei Ie Aji Chōka (向和禮 伊江按司朝嘉) (who will later marry king Shō Shitsu’s fifth daughter)
- Fū Shūdō Tasaki Uēkata Gensei (傅崇道 田嵜親方原清)

Editor

- Sai Taku Shitahaku Uēkata Tenshō

=== Book of Sai On ===
In year 2 of the Yongzheng era (1724), king Shō Kei orders a revision of the Chūzan Seifu to his brother and sessei Shō Tetsu Chatan Wōji Chōki (尚 徹 北谷 王子 朝騎), who delegates the task to a group of scholars led by Sai On Gushichan Uēkata Bunjaku, son of Sai Taku Shitahaku Uēkata Tenshō, who had been several times to China and studied there numerous documents related to Ryūkyū history.

==== Sources ====
The book of Sai On adds to the book of Sai Taku information concerning Ryūkyū found in the chronicles of the Chinese empire. It is mainly based on

- the History of Chūzan (中山沿革志), written by Wan Shu (汪楫) in the year 23 of the Kangxi era (1684) after his visit of the kingdom as a Chinese ambassador during the reign of Shō Tei
- the Book of Sui (隋書), published in 636
- the History of Song (宋史), published in 1345 by Toqto'a (脫脱))
- the History of Yuan (元史), published in 1370 by Song Lian (宋濂).

==== Editors ====
The persons involved in the redaction of the book are mentioned in the preface:

Sessei

- Shō Tetsu Chatan Wōji Chōki

Sanshikan

- Ba Kenzu Urasoe Uēkata Ryōi (馬獻圖 浦添親方良意) (will later become Nago Uēkata)
- Shō Wasei Nishihira Uēkata Chōjo (向和聲/向和声 西平親方朝敘/ 朝叙)
- Mō Shōshō Mabuni Uēkata Ansei (毛承詔 摩文仁 親方 安政)

General supervisors

- Shō Sei Goeku Wōji Chōkei (尚盛 越來王子朝慶), brother of king Shō Eki
- Shō Bunmei Tamagawa Aji Chōyū (向文明 玉川按司朝雄)
- Mō Kōhitsu Gushichan Uēkata Anryō (毛光弼 具志頭親方安亮)

Editor

- Sai On Sueyoshi Uēkata Bunjaku (蔡溫 末吉親方文若) (will later become Gushichan Uēkata)

== Contents ==
=== Book of Sai Taku ===
The book of Sai Taku is dedicated to emperor Kangxi of the Qing dynasty. It presents the annals of the reigns of the different kings of Ryūkyū since the Tenson dynasty. Although the original text stopped at the events of 1701, the book was updated until the death of king Shō Eki in 1712.

It comprises seven volumes: five main volumes, a volume dedicated to the relations with the Satsuma domain and a volume of appendixes.

The book first presents a “genealogical tree of the kings of Chūzan” that includes all the dynasties, before it details each dynasty one by one.

Volume 1 is a general introduction that includes the fondation myths of Ryūkyū and the Tenson dynasty, volume 2 deals with the kings from the Shunten dynasty to the Satto dynasty, volume 3 of the first Shō dynasty and volume 4 and 5 with the kings of the second Shō dynasty until Shō Eki.

The five main volumes include two hundred and thirty six articles.

The most numerous of the articles are the ones dedicated to the commercial and diplomatic relations with China, followed by the ones giving genealogical details for each king (parents, dates of birth and death, spouses, children...). A few articles deal with internal politics, buildings construction or destruction by fire.

The appendix volume is dedicated to the crown princes who never reigned: Shō Kyō and Shō Bun, eldest and second sons of Shō Hō.

The volume dedicated to the relations with the Satsuma domain details those contacts between the reign of Shō Sei and the reign of Shō Tei.

=== Book of Sai On ===
The second edition of the Chūzan Seifu, later called the book of Sai On is finished on year 3 of the Yongzheng era (1725). The book of Sai On adds to the book of Sai Taku information about the Ryūkyū Kingdom that have been found in the chronicles of the Chinese empire.

This version of the Chūzan Seifu included nine volumes, but it was updated gradually until 1876 to reach fourteen main volumes dealing primarily with the relations between Ryūkyū and China and seven appendix volumes dealing primarily with the relations between Ryūkyū, the Satsuma domain and Japan.

Volumes 1 and 2 serve as introduction, volume 3 goes from the Tenson dynasty to King Bunei, volumes 4 and 5 deal with the first Shō dynasty and volumes 6 to 13 with the second Shō dynasty.

The book of Sai On originally included three appendix volumes dealing with the relations with the Satsuma domain, that were revised by Tei Heitetsu Kohagura Uēkata Yūjitsu (鄭秉哲 古波蔵親方祐實) in year 9 of the Yongzheng era (1731) ; Tei Heitetsu Kohagura Uēkata Yūjitsu is also involved in the redaction of the Kyūyō and of the Ryūkyū-koku kyū-ki.

=== Volumes of the current version ===
The book includes the following volumes:

Main volumes

- Introduction – Preface of the Chūzan Seifu, ten regulations, names and clans of the authors, prologue to the Chūzan Seifu, records of the place names of Ryūkyū, genealogical trees
- Vol. 1 – General chronology, conclusion concerning the chronology (foundation myths, list of kings until the first Shō dynasty)
- Vol. 2 – Chronology of the ten thousand generations of Chūzan (list of the kings of the second Shō dynasty)
- Vol. 3 – Tenson dynasty, king Shunten, king Shunbajunki, king Gihon, king Eiso, king Taisei, king Eiji, king Tamagusuku, king Seii, king Satto, king Bunei
- Vol. 4 - King Shō Shishō, king Shō Hashi
- Vol. 5 – King Shō Chū, king Shō Shitatsu, king Shō Kinpuku, king Shō Taikyū, king Shō Toku
- Vol. 6 – King Shō Shoku, king Shō En, king Shō Sen'i, king Shō Shin
- Vol. 7 – King Shō Sei, king Shō Gen, king Shō Ei, king Shō Nei
- Vol. 8 – King Shō Hō, king Shō Ken, king Shō Shitsu, king Shō Tei, king (sic.) Shō Jun
- Vol. 9 – King Shō Eki, king Shō Kei
- Vol. 10 – King Shō Boku, king (sic.) Shō Tetsu, king Shō On, king Shō Sei
- Vol. 11 – King Shō Kō
- Vol. 12 – King Shō Iku, crown prince Shō Shun
- Vol. 13 – King Shō Tai, crown prince Shō Ten

Appendixes

- Preface of the appendixes
- Appendix 1 – King Shō Sei, king Shō Ei, king Shō Nei, king Shō Hō, king Shō Ken, king Shō Shitsu
- Appendix 2 – King Shō Tei
- Appendix 3 – King Shō Eki, king Shō Kei
- Appendix 4 – King Shō Boku
- Appendix 5 – King Shō On, king Shō Sei, king Shō Kō
- Appendix 6 – King Shō Iku
- Appendix 7 – King Shō Tai

== Preserved copies ==
Original copies of the Chūzan Seifu (seven volumes of the book of Sai Taku and twelve volumes of the book of Sai On) that had been stolen during the Second World War were returned to the Government of the Ryukyu Islands in 1953, with a copy of the Chūzan Seikan. They are kept at the Okinawa Prefectural Museum and were designated as national important cultural properties in 2020.

An original copy is conserved by the Shō family. Other copies are conserved in several facilities including the Okinawa Prefectural Library.

There is a woodblock printing version of the book of Sai On, compiled in 1832 by Naoatsu Minamoto (源直温), a Japanese philosopher of the Kokugaku movement. This version only contains the genealogies and the succession of the kings of Ryūkyū. A copy is conserved at the University of the Ryukyus.

The text of the book of Sai On is published in the Collection of historical documents from Ryūkyū (琉球史料叢書), volumes 4 and 5.

== See also ==
- List of Cultural Properties of Japan - writings (Okinawa)
- Chūzan Seikan
- Kyūyō
