= King of Ryukyu =

Monarchs of Okinawa Island (1372–1879)

King of Ryūkyū
- 琉球国王
- Royal Crest

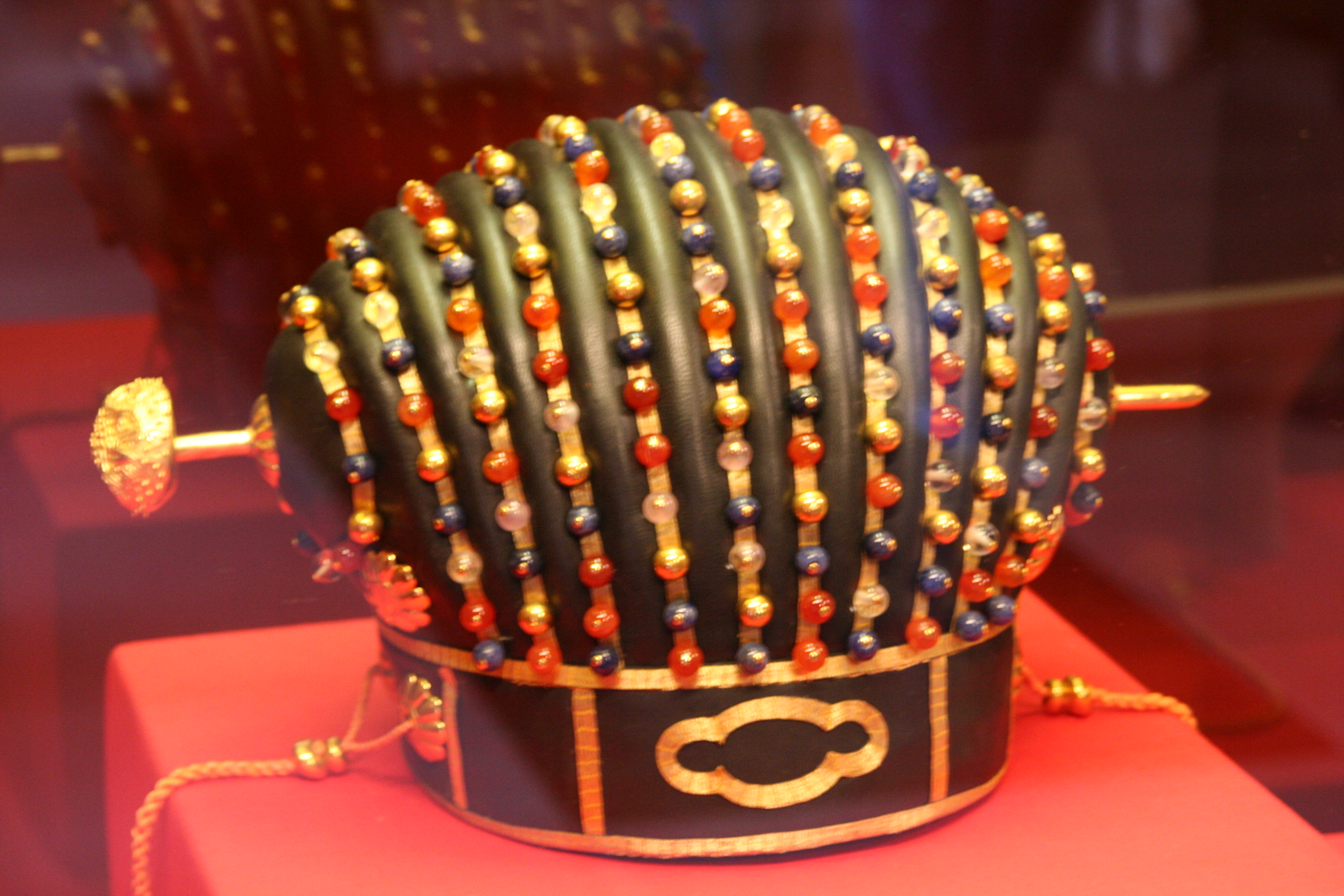
- Crown of the King of Ryūkyū

Details
- Style: Your Majesty (主上, 王上, 聖上); Ushū (御主); Miomae-ganashi (美御前加那志, Okinawan: nmē-ganashī, used by royal family); Shūri-ten-ganashi (首里天加那志, Okinawan: shui-tin-ganashī, used in Okinawa Island); Uchinaa-ganashi (沖縄加那志, used in outlying islands)
- First monarch: Shunten (traditional narrative)
- Last monarch: Shō Tai
- Formed: 1187 (traditional date)
- Abolished: March 17, 1879
- Residence: Shuri Castle
- Pretender: Mamoru Shō

King of Ryūkyū (琉球国王, Ryūkyū koku-ō), also known as King of Lew Chew, King of Chūzan (中山王, Chūzan-ō), or more officially Ryūkyū Kingdom's King of Chūzan (琉球国中山王, Ryūkyū-koku Chūzan-ō), was the title held by several lineages in Okinawa Island from 1372 until the monarchy's dissolution in 1879.

According to the traditional official Okinawan narrative, the legendary ruler Shunten, who supposedly ascended to the throne in 1187, was first to hold the title. Additionally, the notion of a single-line of succession has been maintained despite the Crown clearly recognising several unrelated lineages acceding. However, the monarchy effectively started in 1372 when Satto greeted a Chinese envoy from the newly established Ming dynasty, although his son Bunei was the first to be officially recognized as the King of Chūzan.

Shō Tai was the final sovereign ruler of Ryukyu until his demotion in 1872 by the government of Meiji Japan to the title of Domain King (琉球藩王, Ryūkyū-han-ō) and his forced abdication in 1879. He was inducted into the kazoku with the rank of marquess (侯爵, Kōshaku), earning him a hereditary seat in the House of Peers, which his son later inherited. It is curious that Shō, a monarch, was given a rank lesser than that of some Japanese kuge and daimyo, such as the peasant turned prime minister Itō Hirobumi who received the rank of prince (公爵, Kōshaku) in recognition for his achievements in the Meiji Restoration.

Mamoru Shō is the current pretender to the Okinawan throne.

== Early forms of the narrative ==
The earliest known form of the narrative dates to the reign of King Shō Shin of the Second Shō dynasty. A stone monument dated 1522 makes reference to "three dynasties of Shunten's, Eiso's and Satto's". His son King Shō Sei expressed the line of succession in a slightly more elaborate form. The Katanohana Inscription (1543) reads: "Shō Sei, King of Chūzan of the Great State of Ryūkyū, ascended to the throne as the 21st king since Sonton [Shunten]" (大りうきう国中山王尚清ハ、そんとんよりこのかた二十一代の御くらひをつきめしよわちへ). Similarly, another stone monument dated 1597 states that Shō Nei is the 24th king since Sonton [Shunten] (しやうねいハそんとんよりこのかた二十四たいのわうの御くらゐ...). The numbers of kings mentioned in these monuments agree with those of the official history books compiled much later although it is not clear whether the individual members were fixed at this stage.

Historian Dana Masayuki relates the notion of the line of succession to Buddhist temples where ancestral tablets of the deceased kings were stored. According to the Chūzan Seifu, Manju-ji stored the ancestral tablets of Satto, Bunei, Shishō and Shō Hashi, while the tablets of Shō Taikyū and Shō Toku were at Tenkai-ji. Shō En, the founder of the Second Shō dynasty, established Tennō-ji and designated it as the family mausoleum. It is not certain which temples were dedicated to the missing kings of the First Shō dynasty, Shō Chū, Shō Shitatsu, and Shō Kinpuku. Nevertheless, each king performed "ancestral" worship for deceased kings from different dynasties in the presence of a Chinese envoy, presumably because they deceived the Chinese into thinking that the throne was normally succeeded from the father to the son.

According to the Ryūkyū-koku yuraiki (1713), Ryūfuku-ji in Urasoe, in addition to the above-mentioned temples, served as the royal mausoleum. This temple stored inkstone tablets representing the deceased kings from Shunten to Shō Hashi. According to the Chūzan Seifu, Ryūfuku-ji was originally founded by Eiso under the name of Gokuraku-ji and was re-established by Shō En. Dana Masayuki surmises that Gokuraku-ji used to serve not only as the family mausoleum of the Eiso dynasty but as the state mausoleum tracing the royal line back to Shunten. The apparent conflict between Manju-ji and Gokuraku-ji is resolved if Manju-ji is seen as a representation of the state in relation to China while Gokuraku-ji was the manifestation of Okinawa's own narrative.

Shō Shin established Enkaku-ji and transferred the function of the family mausoleum from Tennō-ji to Enkaku-ji. Shō Shin founded another temple named Sōgen-ji and decided to use it as the state mausoleum while the function of Enkaku-ji was clarified as the mausoleum of the Second Shō dynasty. He moved all ancestral tablets, starting from Shunten, to Sōgen-ji and thereby visualized the single line of succession based on Okinawa's own narrative.

== Minamoto no Tametomo as the father of Shunten ==
Minamoto no Tametomo (1139–1170), the uncle of the Kamakura shogunate's founder Minamoto no Yoritomo, has been consistently treated as the father of Shunten since the earliest official history book, the Chūzan Seikan (1650). The earliest known association of Tametomo with Ryūkyū can be found in a letter written by a Zen monk in Kyoto named Gesshū Jukei (1470–1533) with a request by Kakuō Chisen, another Zen monk serving to Ryūkyū's Tennō-ji. According to a tale which Gesshū attributed to Kakuō, Tametomo moved to Ryūkyū, used demons as servants, and became the founder of the state, which the Minamoto clan had ruled since then. The reference to demons may reflect the centuries-old Japanese Buddhist perception of Ryūkyū as the land of man-eating demons, as seen in, for example, the Hyōtō Ryūkyū-koku ki (1244). Although at this stage, Tametomo was not explicitly associated with Shunten, the tale apparently circulated in the network of Zen Buddhists connecting Kyoto to Okinawa. A similar tale was recorded in the Ryūkyū Shintō-ki (1606) by Jōdo-shū monk Taichū, who visited Ryūkyū from 1603 to 1606. This indicates that by that time, the tale of Tametomo had been known to non-Zen Buddhists. In light of these, the apparent innovation of the Chūzan Seikan (1650) was the explicit association of Tametomo with Shunten.

The tale of Tametomo had a profound impact on Ryūkyū's self-perception. In 1691, for example, the king ordered all the male members of the royal family to use the kanji Chō (朝) as the first of their two-character given names, presumably to indicate an affinity to Minamoto no Tametomo (源為朝).

== Association of the foundation myth with the royal line ==
Another innovation of the Chūzan Seikan (1650) was the association of the foundation myth with the royal line. The foundation myth concerning the goddess Amamikyu itself was recorded in the Ryūkyū Shintō-ki (1606). However, the Chūzan Seikan was the first to make reference to the Tenson-shi (天孫氏), who supposedly descended from the goddess.

Without showing a clear genealogy, the official history books connect the Tenson dynasty remotely to the Eiso dynasty. Eiso's mother dreamed that the sun intruded into her bosom, giving a miraculous birth to Eiso, but Eiso's foster father was said to have descended from the Tenson dynasty. Similarly, Satto was said to have been mothered by a swan maiden. Shō En was believed to have descended from Gihon of the Shunten dynasty (i.e., the second Shō family originated from the Minamoto clan), or some other king. It is not clear why the Chūzan Seikan did not provide a special link to the First Shō dynasty.

== Official narrative ==
=== Tenson dynasty ===
The founder of the Tenson dynasty was a descendant of Amamikyu (阿摩美久; the goddess of creation). The 25 generations of the Tenson dynasty ruled the land for 17,802 years, but their names are unknown.

=== Shunten dynasty ===
The Shunten dynasty lasted from AD 1187 to AD 1259. In 1186, the 25th ruler's throne was usurped by Riyū. Minamoto no Tametomo's son Shunten overthrew Riyū the next year, becoming the king.

| Name | Kanji | Divine name | Reign | Age at death |
|---|---|---|---|---|
| Shunten | 舜天 suntin | Sonton 尊敦 suntun | 1187–1237 | 71 |
| Shunbajunki | 舜馬順煕 | Sonomasu 其益 unumashi or Sonomasumi 其益美 unumashimi | 1238–1248 | 63 |
| Gihon | 義本 jifun | Unknown | 1249–1259 | ? |

=== Eiso dynasty ===
The Eiso dynasty lasted from AD 1260 to AD 1349. In 1259, Gihon, who was the last king of the Shunten dynasty, abdicated his throne. Fathered by the sun, Eiso succeeded him. During the reign of Tamagusuku, the state was divided into three polities. The King of Nanzan (Sannan) and the King of Hokuzan (Sanhoku) came to compete with the King of Chūzan.

| Name | Kanji | Divine name | Reign | Age at death |
|---|---|---|---|---|
| Eiso | 英祖 | Wezo-no-tedako 英祖日子 iiju nu tiidakwa | 1260–1299 | 70 |
| Taisei | 大成 | Unknown | 1300–1308 | 9 or 61 |
| Eiji | 英慈 | Unknown | 1309–1313 | 45 |
| Tamagusuku | 玉城 | Unknown | 1314–1336 | 40 |
| Seii | 西威 | Unknown | 1337–1354 | 21 |

=== Satto dynasty ===
The Satto dynasty lasted from AD 1350 to AD 1405. Satto, the son of a peasant and a swan maiden, replaced Seii as the King of Chūzan. Satto started a tributary relation to the Ming emperor.

| Name | Kanji | Divine name | Reign | Age at death |
|---|---|---|---|---|
| Satto | 察度 | Oho-mamono 大真物 ufu mamun | 1355–1397 | 74 |
| Bunei | 武寧 | Naga-no-mamono 中之真物 naka nu mamun | 1398–1406 | 50 |

=== First Shō dynasty ===
The First Shō dynasty lasted from AD 1429 to AD 1469. Shō Hashi, the virtual founder of the First Shō dynasty, overthrew Bunei in 1406. He installed his father, Shō Shishō, as the nominal King of Chūzan. Shō Hashi annihilated the King of Hokuzan (Sanhoku) in 1416. In 1421, after the death of his father, Shō Hashi became the King of Chūzan. He overthrew the King of Nanzan (Sannan) until 1429, unifying the island. The surname Shō (尚) was given by the Ming emperor.

| Name | Kanji | Divine name | Reign | Age at death |
|---|---|---|---|---|
| Shō Shishō | 尚思紹 | Kimishi-mamono 君志真物 jinshi mamun | 1407–1421 | 67 |
| Shō Hashi | 尚巴志 | Sejitaka-mamono 勢治高真物 shiijitaka mamun | 1422–1439 | 67 |
| Shō Chū | 尚忠 | Unknown | 1440–1442 | 54 |
| Shō Shitatsu | 尚思達 | Kimiteda jintiida 君日 | 1443–1449 | 41 |
| Shō Kinpuku | 尚金福 | Kimishi jinshi 君志 | 1450–1453 | 55 |
| Shō Taikyū | 尚泰久 | Nanojiyomoi 那之志与茂伊 naanujiyumui also called Oho-yononushi 大世主 ufuyu nu ushi | 1454–1460 | 45 |
| Shō Toku | 尚徳 | Hachiman-no-aji 八幡之按司 also called Setaka-ō 世高王 shidaka-oo | 1461–1469 | 29 |

=== Second Shō dynasty ===
The Second Shō dynasty lasted from AD 1470 to AD 1879. When Shō Toku, the last king of the First Shō dynasty, died in 1469, courtiers launched a coup d'état and elected Shō En as king. He became the founder of the Second Shō dynasty. The kingdom was at its peak during the reign of his son, Shō Shin. In 1609, the Satsuma Domain conquered the Ryukyu Kingdom. From then on, Ryūkyū was a vassal state of the Satsuma Domain, while the king was ordered to keep its tributary relation with China. The kingdom became a domain of Japan in 1872. In 1879, Japan replaced Ryukyu Domain with Okinawa Prefecture, formally annexing the islands. King Shō Tai was dethroned and later given the title of marquis.

| Name | Kanji | Divine name | Warabi-naa | Nanui | Reign | Age at death |
|---|---|---|---|---|---|---|
| Shō En | 尚円 | Kanamaru-aji-sohesuwetsugiwaunise 金丸按司添末続王仁子 kanimaru aji shiishii chiji oonishi | Umitukugani 思徳金 | – | 1470–1476 | 61 |
| Shō Sen'i | 尚宣威 | Nishi no yononushi 西之世主 nishi nu yuu nu ushi | ? | – | 1477 | 48 |
| Shō Shin | 尚真 | Ogiyakamowi 於義也嘉茂慧 ujakamui | Makatutarugani 真加戸樽金 | – | 1477–1526 | 61 |
| Shō Sei | 尚清 | Tenitsugi-no-ajisohe 天続之按司添 tinchiji nu ajishii | Manichiyutarugani 真仁堯樽金 | – | 1527–1555 | 59 |
| Shō Gen | 尚元 | Tedahajime-ajisohe 日始按司添 tiidahajimi nu ajishii | Kanichiyuu 金千代 | – | 1556–1572 | 44 |
| Shō Ei | 尚永 | Wezoniyasuhe-ajisohe 英祖仁耶添按司添 iijuniyashii ajishii also called Tedahokori-ō 日豊操王 tiidafukui-oo or Tedayomutori-ō 日豊操王 tiida yumutui oo | ? | – | 1573–1586 | 30 |
| Shō Nei | 尚寧 | Tedagasuhe-ajisohe 日賀末按司添 tiidagasui ajishii | Umitukugani 思徳金 | – | 1587–1620 | 56 |
| Shō Hō | 尚豊 | Tenigiyasuhe-ajisohe 天喜也末按司添 tinjagashii ajishii | Umigurugani 思五郎金 | Chōshō 朝昌 | 1621–1640 | 50 |
| Shō Ken | 尚賢 | – | Umimatsugani 思松金 | ? | 1641–1647 | 23 |
| Shō Shitsu | 尚質 | – | Umitukugani 思徳金 | ? | 1648–1668 | 39 |
| Shō Tei | 尚貞 | – | Umigurugani 思五郎金 | Chōshū 朝周 | 1669–1709 | 64 |
| Shō Eki | 尚益 | – | Umigurugani 思五郎金 | ? | 1710–1712 | 34 |
| Shō Kei | 尚敬 | – | Umitukugani 思徳金 | Chōshi 朝糸 | 1713–1751 | 52 |
| Shō Boku | 尚穆 | – | Umigurugani 思五郎金 | Chōkō 朝康 | 1752–1795 | 55 |
| Shō On | 尚温 | – | Umigurugani 思五郎金 | Chōkoku 朝克 | 1796–1802 | 18 |
| Shō Sei | 尚成 | – | Umitukugani 思徳金 | – | 1803 | 3 |
| Shō Kō | 尚灝 | – | Umijirugani 思次良金 | Chōshō 朝相 | 1804–1828 | 47 |
| Shō Iku | 尚育 | – | Umitukugani 思徳金 | Chōken 朝現 | 1829–1847 | 34 |
| Shō Tai | 尚泰 | – | Umijirugani 思次良金 | Chōken 朝憲 | 1848–1879 | 58 |

==== Honored as king posthumously ====
| Name | Kanji | Warabi-naa | Nanui | Father of | Notes |
|---|---|---|---|---|---|
| Shō Shoku | 尚稷 | ? | – | Shō En, Shō Sen'i | posthumously honored as king in 1699 stripped in 1719 |
| Shō I | 尚懿 | Umitarugani 思太郎金 | Chōken 朝賢 choochin | Shō Nei | posthumously honored as king in 1699 stripped in 1719 |
| Shō Kyū | 尚久 | Masanrugani 真三郎金 | Chōkō 朝公 | Shō Hō | posthumously honored as king in 1699 stripped in 1719 |
| Shō Jun | 尚純 | Umitukugani 思徳金 | ? | Shō Eki | Crown Prince before being able to succeed to the throne |
| Shō Tetsu | 尚哲 | Umitukugani 思徳金 | ? | Shō On, Shō Kō | Crown Prince before being able to succeed to the throne |
