= Shishō =

Shishō 思紹

King of Chūzan
- Reign: 1406–1421
- Predecessor: Bunei
- Successor: Shō Hashi
- Died: 1421; Okinawa
- Burial: Sashiki-yōdore
- Issue: Shō Hashi
- Divine name: Kimishimamono (君志真物)
- House: First Shō dynasty
- Father: Samekawa Ufushu

Shishō, posthumously known as Shō Shishō, was an Okinawan king who ruled the kingdom of Chūzan from 1407 to 1421. The Ryukyuan official histories describe him as the son of Lord Samekawa of Iheya Island. Drawing from evidence from folklore and place names, some scholars have postulated that the family originated near the port of Sashiki in southern Kyushu, Japan. Together with his son Hashi, he was said to have founded Sashiki Castle in Chūzan. Following a diplomatic incident with the Ming dynasty of China in 1406, the official histories describe Hashi leading a coup against the cruel King Bunei of Chūzan and installing his father Shishō as king, founding what would become the First Shō dynasty. Unlike his son, very little is recorded about Shishō in the official histories; he is attested mostly through trade and tribute records with Ming China. Shishō died in 1421 and was succeeded by his son Hashi. He was buried at the tomb of Sashiki yōdore near his castle.

== Origins ==
According to the second edition of the 18th-century Ryukyuan history Chūzan Seifu, citing the Irosetsuden (a collection of Ryukyuan legends), Shishō was the child of Lord Samekawa, from the small island of Iheya near Okinawa. Shishō had one sister, who later served as the priestess of Baten near Sashiki, Okinawa.

Some scholars and historians have postulated that Samekawa and his family came from Higo Province in Kyushu. The early 19th-century Japanese novelist Takizawa Bakin connected the family to Higo based on the shared place name of Sashiki, now part of Ashikita, Kumamoto, in southwestern Kyushu. During the 1400s, Sashiki was an important port town. Writing in the 1930s, scholar Orikuchi Shinobu also connected Sashiki, Okinawa to Sashiki, Kyushu, and theorized that a reference to "Yashiro" in the Omoro Sōshi (a set of chants and songs compiled during the 16th century) may refer to the city of Yatsushiro, Kumamoto.

Local folklore traditionally linked Samekawa's daughter to Kyushu, who was said to have traveled there in order to retrieve a beloved species of fish and reintroduce it to the harbor of Yamato-banta. Following Orikuchi, historian Gregory Smits traces the family to the Nawa clan of Yatsushiro. The shō (紹) character in Shishō's name was suffixed to the posthumous names by the members of the Yatsushiro Nawa. Smits theorizes that Samakawa's family may have been Southern Court-affiliated seafarers (and possibly wokou pirates) during the Nanboku-chō period of late 14th-century Japan, who later migrated to Okinawa.

== Biography ==
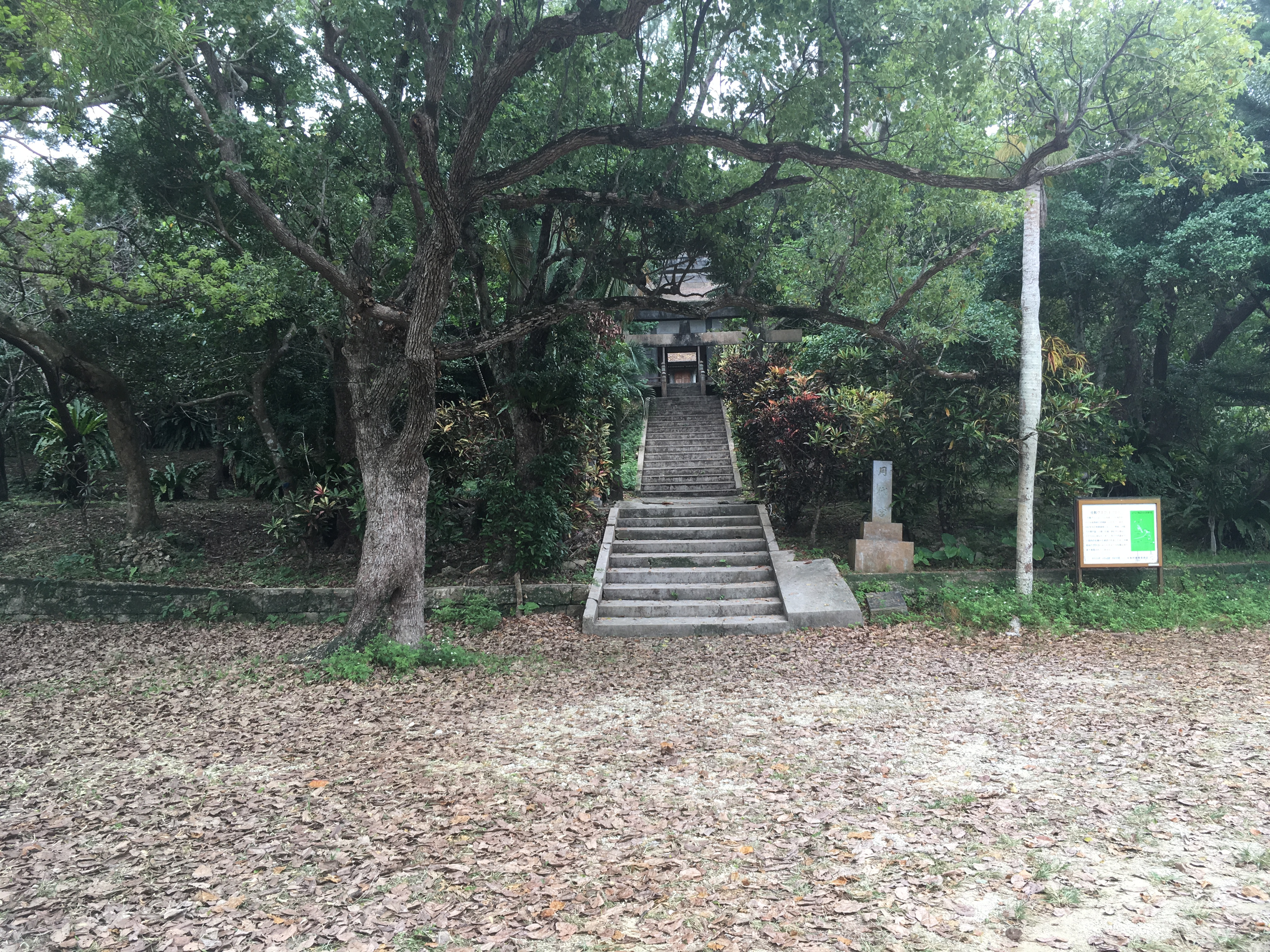
The former site of Sashiki Castle, where Shishō and Hashi are said to have ruled

In 1392, Shishō and Hashi were said to have founded Sashiki Castle in the polity of Chūzan on southern Okinawa, with Hashi becoming the castle's anji (lord). Bunei, the king of Chūzan, was portrayed as an evil and decadent ruler by later histories. He had several men castrated and sent to serve as eunuchs in the court of the Yongle Emperor of China in 1406. The emperor reacted poorly to this; he ordered them returned and stated that it was intolerable that innocent men should be subjected to such treatment. The official histories state that Hashi had led a rebellion against the tyrannical Bunei around this time, conquered Shuri Castle, and installed Shishō as king, founding what would become the First Shō dynasty.

=== Reign ===
Shishō sent a delegation to the Ming court in 1407, which claimed that he was Bunei's son who had taken power after his death. Another man claiming to be Bunei's heir, recorded in Chinese as "Wanning-sijie" (完寧斯結) had arrived in late 1405. A Ryukyuan diplomat named Sangurumii was previously sent to the Ming court as the claimed niece of Satto, and then as the niece of Bunei after Satto's death. After Shishō took the throne, Sangurumii continued to make diplomatic trips to China, claiming to be Shishō's niece. The Chinese merchant-official Ō Mō served as kokusō (chief minister) for portions of the reigns of Shishō and Hashi. Chinese influence increased significantly after Shishō's rise to power, possibly indicating Chinese support in the coup d'état against Bunei.

Unlike his son Hashi, Shishō is rarely mentioned in the official histories of the Ryukyu Kingdom. The 18th-century history Chūzan Seikan ('Reflections on Chūzan') only mentions him as Hashi's father. The 1701 edition of the Chūzan Seifu ('Genealogies of Chūzan') describe him in a brief paragraph, mainly listing the envoys sent during his reign; his chapter in the 1725 edition combines tribute records and discussions of Hashi's activities during his reign. Due to his lack of documentation outside of trade records, Smits describes him as a "name or banner under which Okinawan entities conducted tribute trade".

=== Death and succession ===
Shishō died in 1421, with Hashi succeeding him as king of Chūzan the following year. Shishō was buried at the tomb of Sashiki yōdore, initially built into a cliff face adjacent to Sashiki Castle. Due to environmental damage, the tomb was moved to another cliff in Sashiki in 1764. This site is now on the grounds of the Chinen Sub-Base of the Japan Air Self-Defense Force.

According to the Chūzan Seifu, the Ming emperor Xuande granted Hashi the surname Shō (尚) in 1430, which was posthumously applied to Shishō. This event does not appear within Chinese records, and the practice of the emperor bestowing surnames on others is not otherwise attested. Many later Okinawan families claimed descent from the First Shō dynasty, drawing from the early modern genealogy Samekawa Ōnushi Yuraiki ('History of Lord Samekawa').

Shishō was later granted the divine name Kimishimamono (君志真物), as recorded in two 18th-century histories, the Kyūyō and the Chūzan Seifu. The Omoro Sōshi, a set of Okinawan chants and songs compiled during the 16th century, mentions a lord "Kimishi" (君志) in two passages, one involving a religious rite to a solar deity at Shuri Castle, and another likening his rule to the power of eagles. These references are ambiguous, as the name was used in the divine titles of both Shishō and a later king of the dynasty, Shō Kinpuku.

Regnal titles
Preceded by Bunei	King of Chūzan; 1407–1421	Succeeded by Shō Hashi
