= Shō Ei =

尚永 Shō Ei

King of Ryūkyū
- Reign: 1573–1588
- Predecessor: Shō Gen
- Successor: Shō Nei
- Born: c. 1559
- Died: January 11, 1588 (aged 28–29)
- Burial: Tamaudun, Shuri, Okinawa
- Spouse: Shimajiri-sasukasa Ajiganashi
- Concubine: Mae-agari no Aji; Iri no Aji
- Issue: Aoriyae Ajiganashi (Shō Nei's wife); Kikoe-ōkimi-ganashi
Names
- Shō Ei (尚永)
- Divine name: Wezoniyasuhe-ajisohe (英祖仁耶添按司添 eesooniyashii ajishii) also Tedahokori-ō (日誇王 tiidafukui oo)or Tedayomutori-ō (日豊操王 tiida yumutui-oo)
- House: Second Shō dynasty
- Father: Shō Gen
- Mother: Mawashi Ajiganashi

Shō Ei (尚 永; c. 1559 – 11 January 1588) was king of the Ryukyu Kingdom from 1573 to 1588.

== Life ==
Shō Ei was the son of Shō Gen and his wife, and was the second son of king Shō Gen.

He died in 1588 without an heir. His son-in-law Shō Nei was installed as the king.

Regnal titles
Preceded by Shō Gen	King of Ryūkyū; 1573-1588	Succeeded by Shō Nei
