= Shō Sei =

Shō Sei 尚清
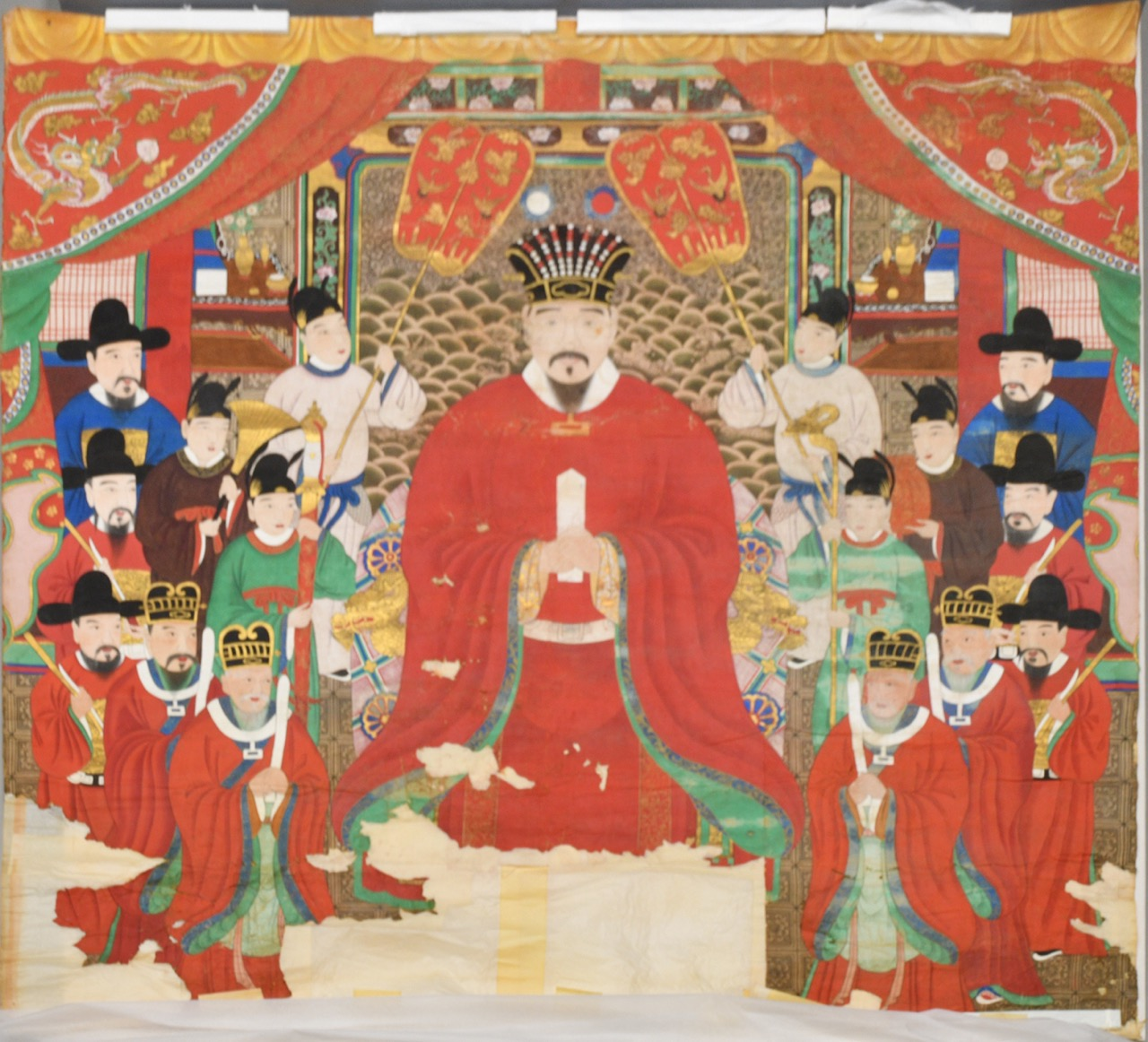
- Ugui memorial portrait of King Shō Sei

King of Ryūkyū
- Reign: 1526 – 1555
- Predecessor: Shō Shin
- Successor: Shō Gen
- Born: Manikiyotarugani (真仁堯樽金 manichutarugani); 1497
- Died: 1555 (aged 57–58)
- Burial: Tamaudun, Shuri
- Spouse: Umimajingani Ajiganashi
- Concubine: Mazuru-gane, Shirono Ōajishirare; Maninaku-gane, Ōajishirare; Mayojin-gane, Ōajishirare; Yonabaru Agomosirare
- Issue: Shō Tei, Crown Prince Nakagusuku; Shō Gen, Prince Kume-Nakagusuku; Shō Yōsō, Prince Katsuren Chōsō; Shō Kanshin, Prince Ōie; Shō Kan, Prince Chatan Chōri; Shō Hankoku, Prince Kochinda Chōten; Shō Sōken, Prince Ie Chōgi; Shō Kōtoku, Prince Yuntanza Chōbyo; Shō Kyōrei, Prince Tomigusuku Chōkyō; Shō Etsu, Prince Haneji Chōbu; Princess Aoriyae Ajiganashi; Princess Shuriōkimi Ajiganashi
Names
- Shō Sei (尚清)
- Divine name: Tenitsugi-no-ajisohe (天続之按司添 tin chiji nu ajishii)
- House: Second Shō dynasty
- Father: Shō Shin
- Mother: Umitugani Ajiganashi

Shō Sei (尚清; 1497–1555) was king of the Ryukyu Kingdom from 1526 to 1555. He was the fifth son of King Shō Shin, who he succeeded.

== Life ==
Shō Sei suppressed a rebellion on Amami Ōshima in 1537 and took steps to improve defenses against wakō that same year.

Shō Sei died in 1555 and was succeeded by his second son Shō Gen.

== See also ==
- Imperial Chinese missions to the Ryukyu Kingdom

== Notes ==
Regnal titles
| Preceded by Shō Shin | King of Ryūkyū; 1527-1555 | Succeeded by Shō Gen |
