= Ryūkyū Shintō-ki =

1605/1606 book by Taichū Ryōtei

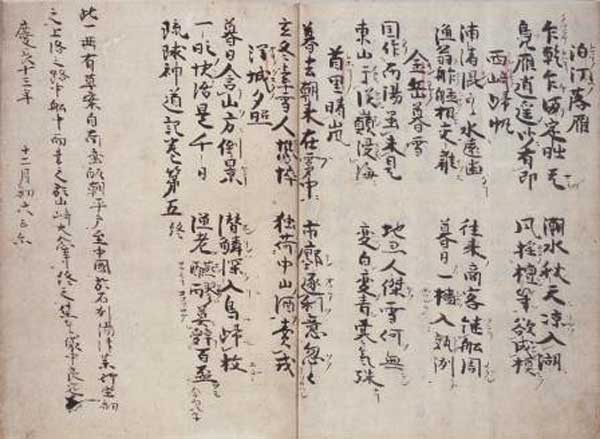
From the 1608 copy in two volumes at Taichū-an, Kyoto (ICP)

Ryūkyū Shintō-ki (琉球神道記) or An account of the ways of the gods in Ryūkyū is a five-volume treatise of c. 1605/6 by the Jōdo-sect Japanese priest Taichū Ryōtei (袋中良定) (1552–1639), who lived in Naha from 1603 to 1606. Unlike most Okinawan literature, it predates the Satsuma invasion of 1609. A woodblock print edition was published in Kyoto in 1648.

The five volumes traverse Indian and Chinese Buddhism before turning to the religions of the Ryūkyū Kingdom. The work includes the earliest extant version of the Ryūkyūan creation myth as well as the first account of Minamoto no Tametomo coming to Okinawa and there siring the future King Shunten.

== See also ==
- List of Cultural Properties of Japan - writings (Okinawa)
- Ryukyuan religion
- Chūzan Seikan
- Honji suijaku
