= Shō Gen =

尚元 Shō gen
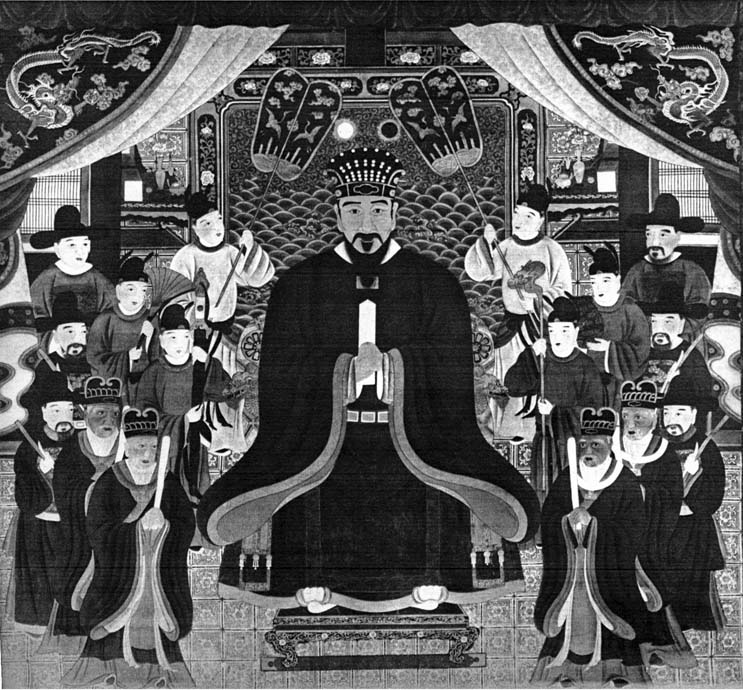
- King Shō Gen in a painting by Shō Genko in 1796.

King of Ryūkyū
- Reign: 1556–1572
- Predecessor: Shō Sei
- Successor: Shō Ei
- Born: Kanichiyo (金千代); March 25, 1528
- Died: May 12, 1572 (aged 44)
- Burial: Tamaudun, Shuri
- Spouse: Mawashi Kikoe-ōkimi-kanashi
- Concubine: Kume-Gushikawa Aji-shirare; Mēagari no Aji; Mafē Aji
- Issue: Shō Kōhaku, Prince Kume-Gushikawa Chōtsū; Shō Ei, Prince Aoriyae; Shō Kyū, Prince Kin Chōkō; Princess Shuri-ōkimi Ajiganashi
Names
- Shō Gen (尚元)
- Divine name: Tedahajime-ajisohe (日始按司添 tiidahajimi ajishii)
- House: Second Shō dynasty
- Father: Shō Sei
- Mother: Umimajingani Aji-ganashi

Shō Gen (尚元; 25 March 1528 – 12 May 1572) was king of the Ryukyu Kingdom from 1556 to 1572. He was called "Gen, the mute."

== Life ==
The king required considerable support from the Sanshikan (Council of Three), the chief council of royal advisors. His reign marked the beginning of the council's demonstration of significantly greater effectiveness and efficiency than previously.

Shō Gen received his official investiture from the Ming Court in 1562, and received emissaries from the Shimazu clan of the Japanese province of Satsuma in 1570 and 1572. The Shimazu wished to establish some control over the Ryukyus, making them either a tributary or a vassal state. The kingdom resisted the Shimazu overtures, and a small punitive mission launched by the Shimazu created a small skirmish on the island of Amami Ōshima in 1571, although the Ryukyuans defeated them.

He was the second son of King Shō Sei, who he succeeded, and was succeeded in turn by his second son, Shō Ei.

== See also ==
- Imperial Chinese missions to the Ryukyu Kingdom

== Notes ==
Regnal titles
Preceded by Shō Sei	King of Ryūkyū; 1556-1572	Succeeded by Shō Ei
