= Kaiki (minister) =

Ryukyuan minister (fl. 1427–1451)

Kaiki (懐 機; fl. 1427–1451), also known as Huai Ji, was a politician and diplomat of the Ryukyu Kingdom.

Kaiki was a Daoist practitioner of Ming Chinese ancestry. He was appointed Kokushō (国相, "Chief Minister") by the King Shō Hashi. He played an important role in the unification of Ryukyu.

In 1427, he dug the artificial lake Ryūtan Pond (龍潭) and constructed an artificial hill named Mt. Ankoku (安国山) next to it. He then brought many flowers from China and planted them on the hill.

In 1451, during Shō Kinpuku's reign, he built a one-kilometer-long dam, which known as Chōkō Dam (長虹堤, Chōkōtei), to connect Naha harbor and Tomari harbor.

Political offices
Preceded by Ō Mō	Sessei of Ryukyu; 1428? - ?	Vacant Title next held by Gushichan Chōsei
