= Ryukyu Kingdom =

Island kingdom in East Asia (1429–1879)

Coordinates: 26°12′N 127°41′E

Ryukyu Kingdom 琉球國 Ruuchuu-kuku
- 1429–1879
- Merchant flag Royal mon
- Anthem: Ishinagu no Uta
- Royal seal

- The Ryukyu Kingdom at its maximum extent (present-day Okinawa Prefecture and the Amami Islands)
- Status: Tributary state of the Ming dynasty (1429–1644); Tributary state of the Southern Ming (1644–1646); Tributary state of the Qing dynasty (1646–1872); Vassal state of the Satsuma Domain (1609–1872); Domain of the Empire of Japan (1872–1879)
- Capital: Shuri
- Common languages: Ryukyuan languages (indigenous), Classical Chinese, Classical Japanese
- Religion: Ryukyuan religion (state religion), Shinto, Buddhism, Confucianism, Taoism
- Demonym: Ryukyuan
- Government: Monarchy
- King (國王)
  - 1429–1439: Shō Hashi
  - 1477–1526: Shō Shin
  - 1587–1620: Shō Nei
  - 1848–1879: Shō Tai
- Sessei (摂政)
  - 1666–1673: Shō Shōken
- Regent (國師)
  - 1751–1752: Sai On
- Legislature: Shuri cabinet (首里王府), Sanshikan (三司官)
- History
  - Unification of Okinawa Island: 1429
  - Satsuma invasion: 5 April 1609
  - Reorganized into Ryukyu Domain: 16 October 1872
  - Reorganized as Okinawa Prefecture: 4 April 1879
- Currency: Ryukyuan, Chinese, and Japanese mon coins
Preceded by
Hokuzan
Chūzan
Nanzan
Succeeded by
Empire of Japan
Satsuma Domain
Ryukyu Domain
- Today part of: Japan

The Ryukyu Kingdom (Note: Okinawan: 琉球國, romanized: Ruuchuu-kuku; Japanese: 琉球王国, romanized: Ryūkyū Ōkoku, IPA: [ɾʲjɨ̀ɨ́.k̟ʲj̊ɨ́ɨ̀, -k̟ʲj̊ɨ́ɨ́ ó̞ò̞.kò̞.kɯ̈̀, ɾʲjɨ́ɨ́-]; Middle Chinese: 琉球國, romanized: Ljuw-gjuw kwok; Manchu: ᠯᡳᠣ ᠴᡳᠣ ᡤᡠᡵᡠᠨ Lio Cio Gurun; ᠯᡳᠣ ᡴᡳᠣ ᡤᡠᡵᡠᠨ Lio Kio Gurun; Classical Chinese: 大琉球國 (lit. 'Great Lew Chew Country'); Historical English names: Lew Chew, Lewchew, Luchu, and Loochoo; Historical French name: Liou-tchou; Historical Dutch name: Lioe-kioe) was a kingdom in the Ryukyu Islands from 1429 until 1872, when it was reorganized as the Ryukyu Domain, before being fully abolished in 1879. It was ruled as a tributary state of the Ming dynasty by the Ryukyuan monarchy, who unified Okinawa Island to end the Sanzan period, and subsequently extended the kingdom to the Amami Islands and Sakishima Islands. The Ryukyu Kingdom played a central role in the maritime trade networks of medieval East Asia and Southeast Asia despite its small size. The Ryukyu Kingdom became a vassal state of the Satsuma Domain of Japan after the invasion of Ryukyu in 1609 but retained de jure independence until it was transformed into the Ryukyu Domain by the Empire of Japan in 1872. (Note: Although the Ryukyuan king was a vassal of the Satsuma Domain, the Ryukyu Kingdom was not considered part of any Han due to trade relations with China.) The Ryukyu Domain was abolished by the Meiji government in 1879 and reorganized as Okinawa Prefecture, and the Ryukyuan monarchy was integrated into the new Japanese nobility.

== History ==
=== Origins of the Kingdom ===
In the 14th century small domains scattered on Okinawa Island were unified into three principalities: Hokuzan (北山; Northern Mountain), Chūzan (中山; Central Mountain), and Nanzan (南山; Southern Mountain). This was known as the Sanzan (三山; Three Mountains) period. Hokuzan, which constituted much of the northern half of the island, was the largest in terms of land area and military strength but was economically the weakest of the three. Nanzan constituted the southern portion of the island. Chūzan lay in the center of the island and was economically the strongest. Its political capital at Shuri, Nanzan was adjacent to the major port of Naha, and Kume-mura, the center of traditional Chinese education. These sites and Chūzan as a whole would continue to form the center of the Ryukyu Kingdom until its abolition.

Many Chinese people moved to Ryukyu to serve the government or to engage in business during this period. At the request of the Ryukyuan king, the Ming Chinese sent thirty-six Chinese families from Fujian to manage oceanic dealings in the kingdom in 1392, during the Hongwu Emperor's reign. Many Ryukyuan officials were descended from these Chinese immigrants, being born in China or having Chinese grandfathers. They assisted the Ryukyuans in advancing their technology and diplomatic relations. On 30 January 1406, the Yongle Emperor expressed horror when the Ryukyuans castrated some of their own children to become eunuchs to serve in the Ming imperial palace. Emperor Yongle said that the boys who were castrated were innocent and did not deserve castration, and he returned them to Ryukyu, and instructed the kingdom not to send eunuchs again.

These three principalities (tribal federations led by major chieftains) battled, and Chūzan emerged victorious. The Chūzan leaders were officially recognized by Ming dynasty China as the rightful kings over those of Nanzan and Hokuzan, thus lending great legitimacy to their claims. The ruler of Chūzan passed his throne to King Hashi; Hashi conquered Hokuzan in 1416 and Nanzan in 1429, uniting the island of Okinawa for the first time, and founded the first Shō dynasty. Hashi was granted the surname "Shō" (Chinese: 尚; pinyin: Shàng) by the Ming emperor in 1421, becoming known as Shō Hashi (Chinese: 尚巴志; pinyin: Shàng Bāzhì).

Shō Hashi adopted the Chinese hierarchical court system, built Shuri Castle and the town as his capital, and constructed Naha harbor. When in 1469 King Shō Toku, who was a grandson of Shō Hashi, died without a male heir, a palatine servant declared he was Toku's adopted son and gained Chinese investiture. This pretender, Shō En, began the Second Shō dynasty. Ryukyu's golden age occurred during the reign of Shō Shin, the second king of that dynasty, who reigned from 1478 to 1526.

=== Invasion of neighbouring islands and the Amami islands ===
In 1429, during the reign of King Shō Hashi, Ryukyu invaded Okinoerabu Island and Yoron Island. This was the first stage of Ryukyu's southward expansion policy (南下政策) beyond Okinawa Island. In 1447, King Shō Shitatsu conquered Amami Oshima. In 1466, King Shō Toku attacked Kikai Island on two occasions. Despite fierce resistance from the islanders, which resulted in heavy casualties, the island was ultimately brought under the control of the Kingdom of Ryukyu. King Shō Toku himself led 2,000 soldiers in large-scale military operations, but the cost of the war fuelled domestic discontent. The Amami Islands, along with the other Nansei Islands, became part of the Ryukyu Kingdom's territory from the Muromachi period onwards.

The Amami Islands (including Amami Oshima, Tokunoshima, Okinoerabu Island, and Kikai Island) had previously traded with the Dazaifu, where they are recorded as 掩美嶋 (Aakumi Island) in wooden tablets (mokkan). During the Kamakura and Nanbokuchō periods, Amami was held as the property of Hōjō Tokimune. Subsequently, the Chikama clan (千竈氏) was installed as stewards (jitō, 地頭) of Satsuma Province (薩摩国), a territory of the Shimazu clan.

A document known as the Chikama Tokiie Bequest (千竈時家譲状), dated 14 April 1306, records that Chikama Tokiie granted Kikai Island and Oshima to his heir Sadayasu; Erabu Island to his second son Tsuneie; seven islands to his third son Kumayashamaru; and Toku Island to his daughter Himekuma.

=== Golden age of maritime trade ===
For nearly two hundred years the Ryukyu Kingdom would thrive as a key player in maritime trade with Southeast and East Asia. Central to the kingdom's maritime activities was the continuation of the tributary relationship with Ming dynasty China, begun by Chūzan in 1372, (Note: Nanzan and Hokuzan also entered into tributary relationships with Ming China, in 1380 and 1383 respectively.) and enjoyed by the three Okinawan kingdoms which followed it. China provided ships for Ryukyu's maritime trade activities, allowed a limited number of Ryukyuans to study at the Imperial Academy in Beijing, and formally recognized the authority of the King of Chūzan, allowing the kingdom to trade formally at Ming ports. Ryukyuan ships, often provided by China, traded at ports throughout the region, which included, among others, China, Đại Việt (Vietnam), Japan, Java, Korea, Luzon, Malacca, Pattani, Palembang, Siam, and Sumatra.

Seal from Qing China giving authority to the King of Ryukyu to rule. Written in Chinese (琉球國王之印) and Manchu (ᠯᡳᠣ ᠴᡳᠣ ᡤᡠᡵᡠᠨ ᡳ ᠸᠠᠩ ᠨᡳ ᡩᠣᡵᠣᠨ, Lio Cio Gurun -i Wang ni Doron)

The main building of Shuri Castle

Japanese products—silver, swords, fans, lacquerware, folding screens—and Chinese products—medicinal herbs, minted coins, glazed ceramics, brocades, textiles—were traded within the kingdom for Southeast Asian sappanwood, rhino horn, tin, sugar, iron, ambergris, Indian ivory, and Arabian frankincense. Altogether, 150 voyages between the kingdom and Southeast Asia on Ryukyuan ships were recorded in the Rekidai Hōan, an official record of diplomatic documents compiled by the kingdom, as having taken place between 1424 and the 1630s, with 61 of them bound for Siam, 10 for Malacca, 10 for Pattani, and 8 for Java, among others.

The Chinese policy of haijin (海禁, "sea bans"), limiting trade with China to tributary states and those with formal authorization, along with the accompanying preferential treatment of the Ming Court towards Ryukyu, allowed the kingdom to flourish and prosper for roughly 150 years. In the late 16th century, however, the kingdom's commercial prosperity fell into decline. The rise of the wokou threat among other factors led to the gradual loss of Chinese preferential treatment; the kingdom also suffered from increased maritime competition from Portuguese traders.

=== Rebellion against the Shuri government Court and Centralization power ===
In 1493, Ryukyu and the “Japanese warships”(日本甲船) were involved in a conflict in Amami and Ryukyu was victorious in the incident. In 1500, the Oyake Akahachi Rebellion broke out in Ishigaki Island, one of Yaeyama Islands. King Shō Shin deployed approximately 3,000 troops and 46 warships to conquer the region. In 1507, he invaded Kume Island, and in 1522, he suppressed the rebellion of Onikō in Yonaguni (与那国・ 鬼 虎 の乱). In 1537 and 1571, he suppressed rebellions in the Amami region.

In 1509, as stated in stone tablet "Momourasoe-no-Kanmei" (百浦添之欄干之銘), the so-called “sword hunt”(刀狩り) was carried out, and all weapons possessed by the nobility called Samure (士族) and civilians were confiscated and stored in the royal armory under the strict control of the Shuri royal government. To suppress the rebellion of the ajis (按司 local lords), he forced them to reside in the vicinity of Shuri Castle and effectively dismantled the military capabilities of their subordinate troops.

As Shuri royal government concentrated its forces in Naha, central region were poorly defended, where the Satsuma army landed.

=== Satsuma Clan's invasion and subordination ===
Around 1590, Toyotomi Hideyoshi asked the Ryukyu Kingdom to aid in his campaign to conquer Korea. If successful, Hideyoshi intended to then move against China. As the Ryukyu Kingdom was a tributary state of the Ming dynasty, the request was refused. The Tokugawa shogunate that emerged following Hideyoshi's fall authorized the Shimazu family—feudal lords of the Satsuma domain (present-day Kagoshima Prefecture)—to send an expeditionary force to conquer the Ryukyus. The subsequent invasion took place in 1609, but Satsuma still allowed the Ryukyu Kingdom to find itself in a period of "dual subordination" to Japan and China, wherein Ryukyuan tributary relations were maintained with both the Tokugawa shogunate and the Chinese court.

Occupation occurred fairly quickly, with some fierce fighting, and King Shō Nei was taken prisoner to Kagoshima and later to Edo (modern-day Tokyo). To avoid giving the Qing any reason for military action against Japan, the king was released two years later and the Ryukyu Kingdom regained a degree of autonomy. However, the Satsuma domain took back the control over some territory of the Ryukyu Kingdom, notably the Amami-Ōshima island group, which was incorporated into the Satsuma domain and remains a part of Kagoshima Prefecture, not Okinawa Prefecture.

The kingdom was described by Hayashi Shihei in Sangoku Tsūran Zusetsu, which was published in 1785.

=== Tributary relations ===
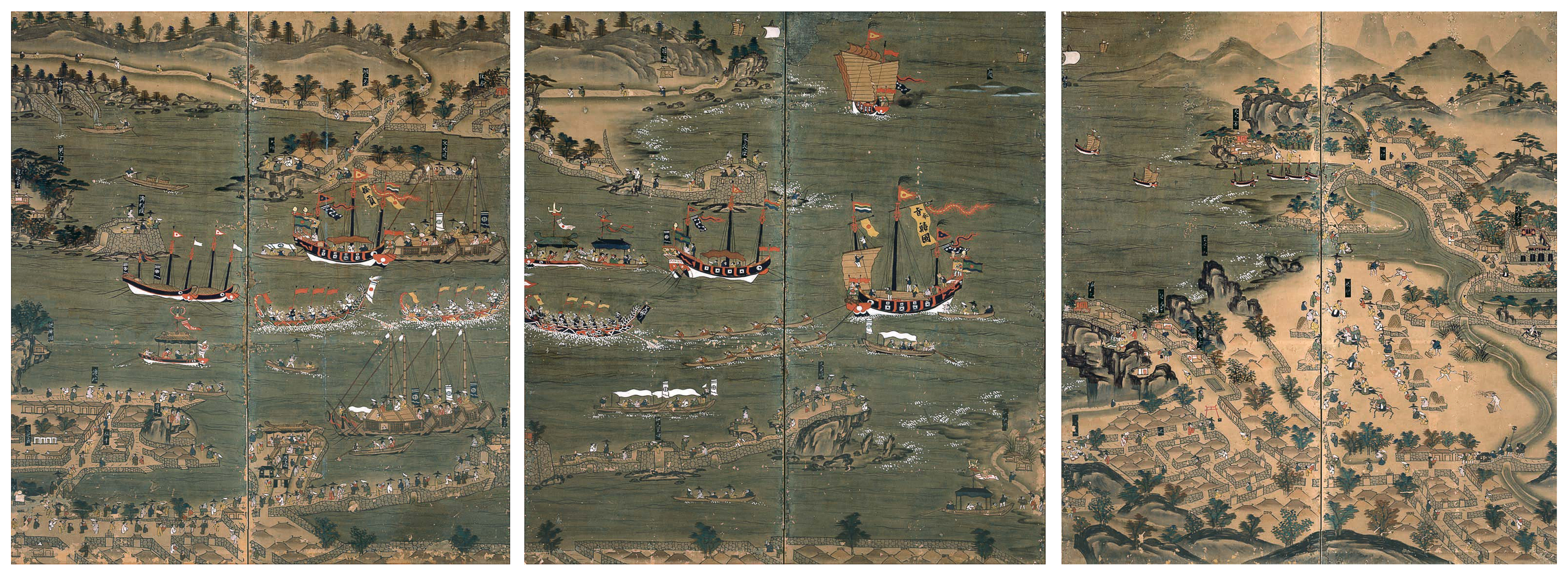
Ryukyu Tribute Ship folding screen (circa 1830)

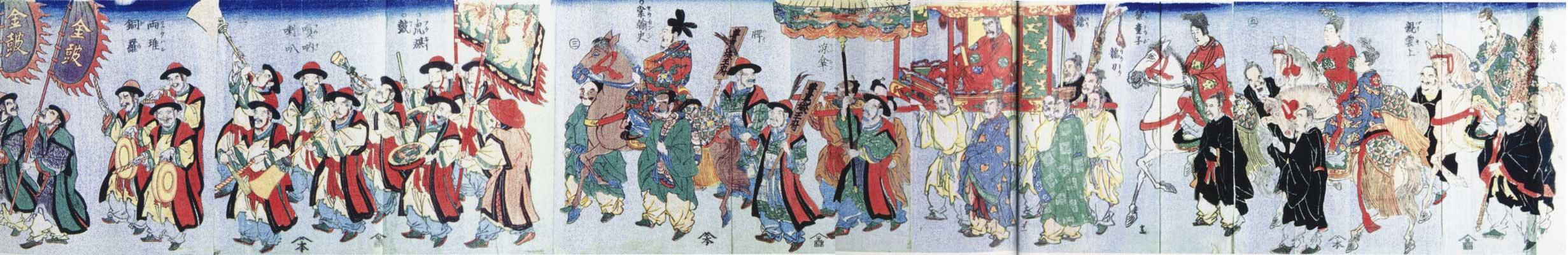
An 1832 Ryukyuan mission to Edo, Japan; 98 people with a music band and officials

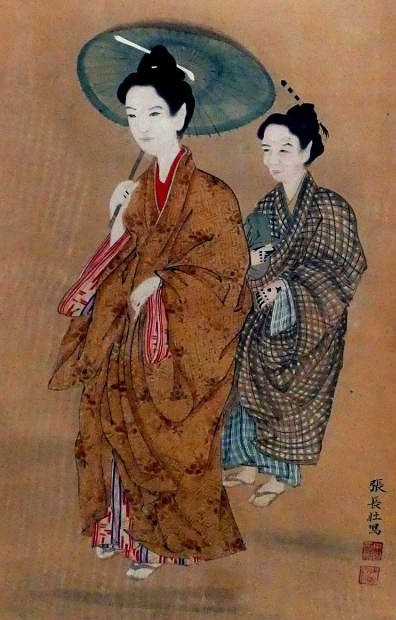
Traditional Ryukyuan clothes in the late period, which were much closer to the Japanese kimono.

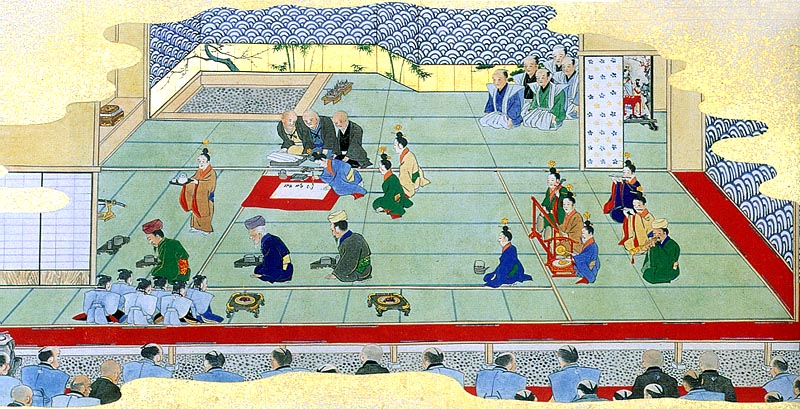
Ryukyuan court music performed in Japan

In 1655, tribute relations between Ryukyu and Qing dynasty (dynasty of China that followed the Ming Dynasty after its end in 1644) were formally approved by the shogunate. This was seen to be justified, in part, because of the desire to avoid giving Qing any reason for military action against Japan.

Since Ming China prohibited trade with Japan, the Satsuma domain, with the blessing of the Tokugawa shogunate, used the trade relations of the kingdom to continue to maintain trade relations with China. Considering that Japan had previously severed ties with most European countries except the Dutch, such trade relations proved especially crucial to both the Tokugawa shogunate and Satsuma domain, which would use its power and influence, gained in this way, to help overthrow the shogunate in the 1860s.

The Ryukyuan king was a vassal of the Satsuma daimyō, after Shimazu's Ryukyu invasion in 1609, the Satsuma Clan established a governmental office's branch known as Zaibankaiya (在番仮屋) or Ufukaiya (大仮屋) at Shuri in 1628, and became the base of Ryukyu domination for 250 years, until 1872. The Satsuma Domain's residents can be roughly compared to a European resident in a protectorate. However, the kingdom was not considered as part of any han (fief): up until the formal annexation of the islands and abolition of the kingdom in 1872, the Ryukyus were not truly considered de jure part of Edo Japan. Though technically under the control of Satsuma, Ryukyu was given a great degree of autonomy, to best serve the interests of the Satsuma daimyō and those of the shogunate, in trading with China. Ryukyu was a tributary state of China, and since Japan had no formal diplomatic relations with China, it was essential that China not realize that Ryukyu was controlled by Japan. Thus, Satsuma—and the shogunate—was obliged to be mostly hands-off in terms of not visibly or forcibly occupying Ryukyu or controlling the policies and laws there. The situation benefited all three parties involved—the Ryukyu royal government, the Satsuma daimyō, and the shogunate—to make Ryukyu seem as much a distinctive and foreign country as possible. Japanese were prohibited from visiting Ryukyu without shogunal permission, and the Ryukyuans were forbidden from adopting Japanese names, clothes, or customs. They were even forbidden from divulging their knowledge of the Japanese language during their trips to Edo; the Shimazu family, daimyōs of Satsuma, gained great prestige by putting on a show of parading the King, officials, and other people of Ryukyu to and through Edo. As the only han to have a king and an entire kingdom as vassals, Satsuma gained significantly from Ryukyu's exoticness, reinforcing that it was an entirely separate kingdom.

According to statements by Qing imperial official Li Hongzhang in a meeting with Ulysses S. Grant, China had a special relationship with the island and the Ryukyu had paid tribute to China for hundreds of years, and the Chinese reserved certain trade rights for them in an amicable and beneficial relationship. Japan ordered tributary relations to end in 1875 after the tribute mission of 1874 was perceived as a show of submission to China.

=== Annexation by the Japanese Empire ===
In 1872, Emperor Meiji unilaterally declared that the kingdom was then Ryukyu Domain. At the same time, the appearance of independence was maintained for diplomatic reasons with Qing China until the Meiji government abolished the Ryukyu Domain when the islands were incorporated as Okinawa Prefecture on 27 March 1879. The Amami-Ōshima island group which had been integrated into Satsuma Domain became a part of Kagoshima Prefecture.

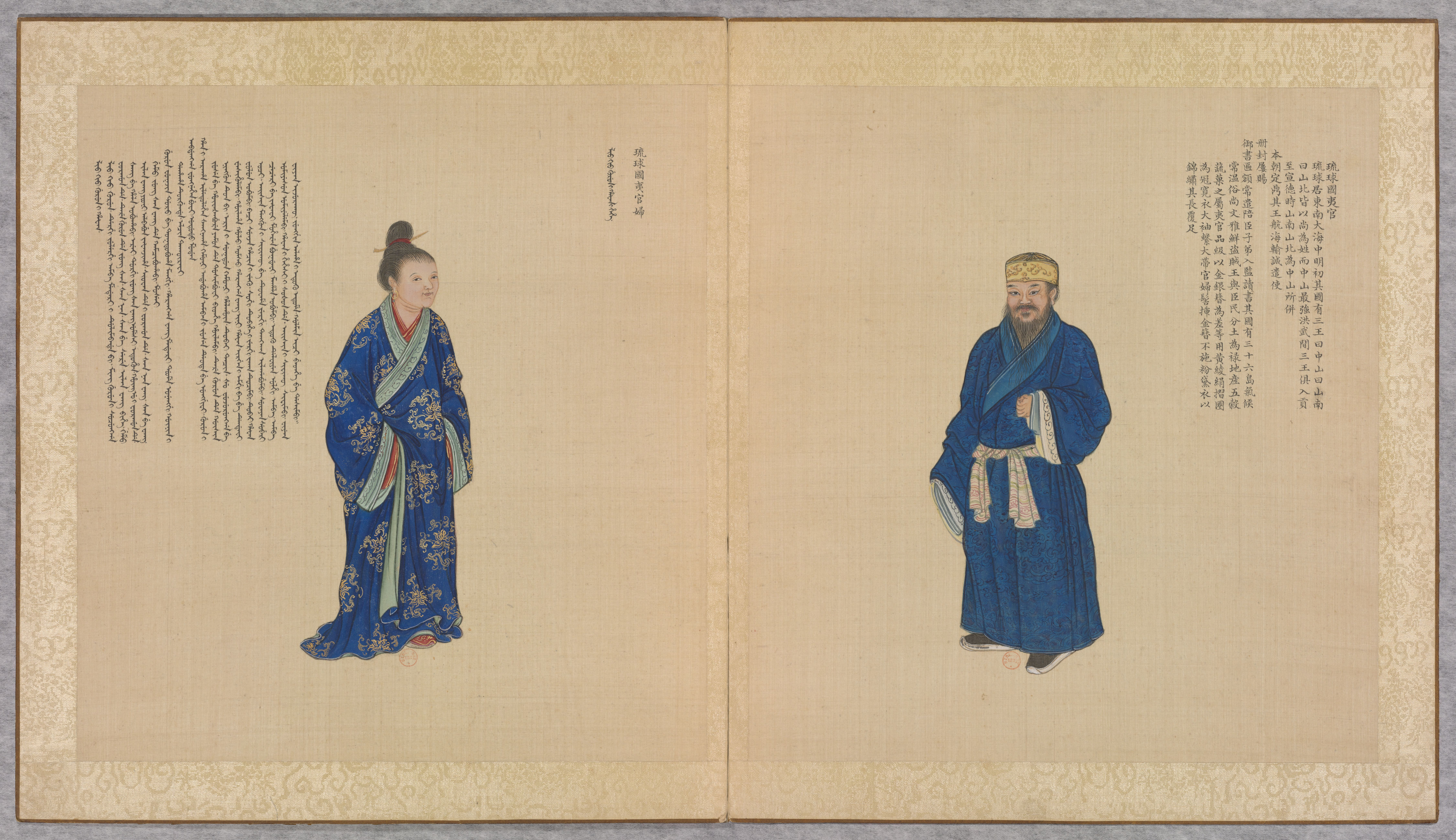
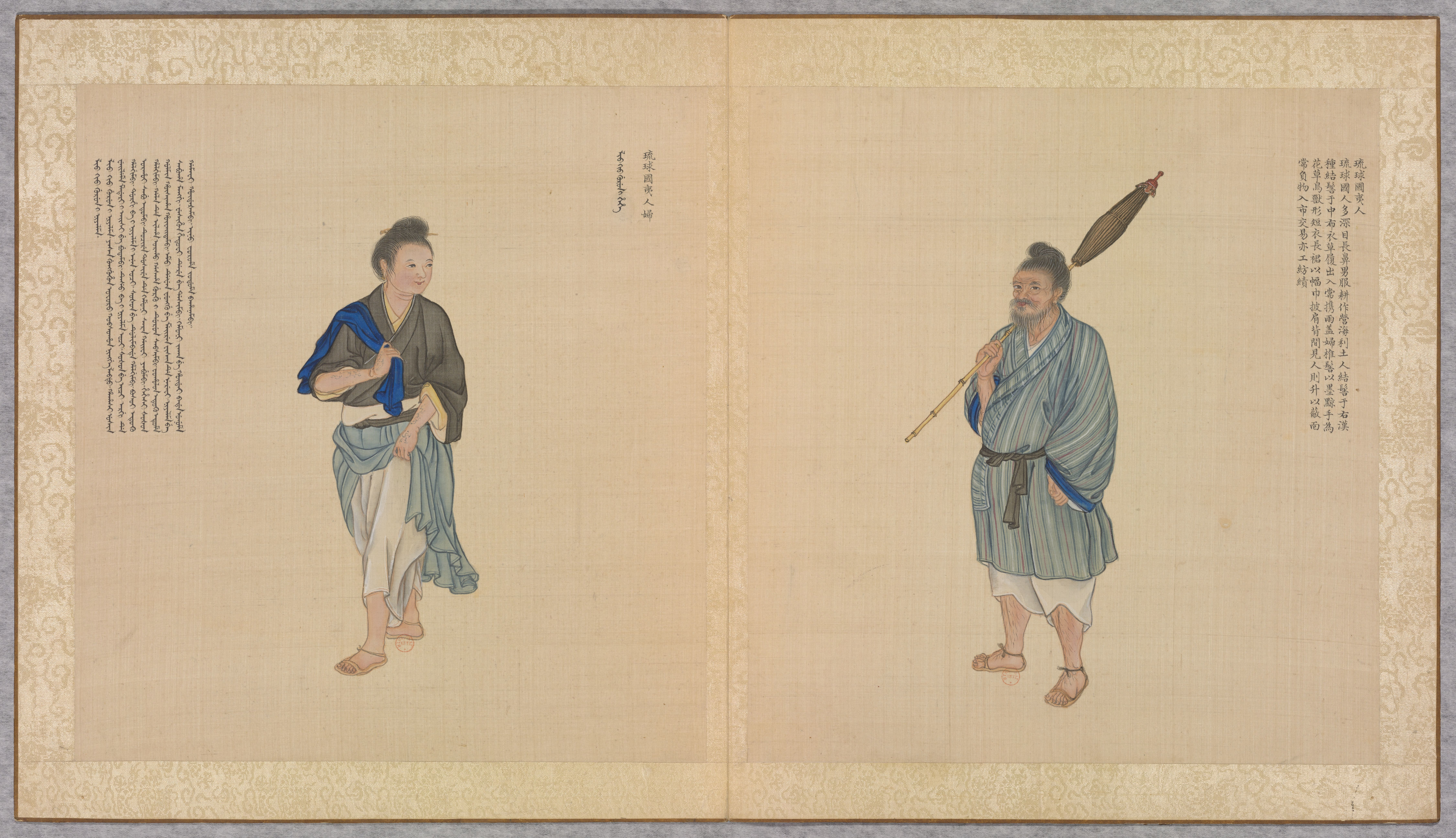
Ryukyu people depicted in the Chinese paintings Portraits of Periodical Offering

The last king of Ryukyu was forced to relocate to Tokyo, and was given a compensating kazoku rank as Marquis Shō Tai. Many royalist supporters fled to China. The king's death in 1901 diminished the historic connections with the former kingdom. With the abolition of the aristocracy after World War II, the Sho family continues to live in Tokyo.

== Major events ==
- 1187 – Shunten becomes King of Okinawa, based at Urasoe Castle.
- 1272 – Envoys from the Mongol Empire are expelled from Okinawa by King Eiso.
- 1276 – Mongols are violently driven off the island again.
- 1372 – The first Ming dynasty envoy visits Okinawa, which had been divided into three kingdoms during the Sanzan period. Formal tributary relations with the Chinese Empire begin.
- 1389 – An envoy from Ryukyu visits the Goryeo Kingdom, resulting in diplomatic ties between the two kingdoms.
- 1392 – An envoy from Ryukyu visits the Joseon Kingdom.
- 1416 – Chūzan, led by Shō Hashi, occupies Nakijin Castle, capital of Hokuzan.
- 1429 – Chūzan occupies Nanzan Castle, capital of Nanzan, unifying Okinawa Island. Shō Hashi moves the capital to Shuri Castle (now part of modern-day Naha).
- 1458 – Amawari's rebellion against the Kingdom.
- 1466 – Kikai Island invaded by Ryukyu.
- 1470 – Shō En (Kanemaru) establishes the Second Shō dynasty.
- 1477 – Shō Shin, whose rule is called the "Great Days of Chūzan", ascends to the throne. Golden age of the kingdom.
- 1500 – Sakishima Islands annexed by Ryukyu.
- 1609 – (5 April) Daimyō (Lord) of Satsuma in southern Kyūshū invades the kingdom. King Shō Nei is captured.
- 1611 – In accordance with the peace treaty, Satsuma annexes the Amami and Tokara Islands (Satsunan Islands); Kings of Ryukyu become vassals to the daimyō of the Satsuma Domain.
- 1623 – Completion of Omoro Sōshi.
- 1650 – Completion of Chūzan Seikan.
- 1724 – Completion of Chūzan Seifu.
- 1745 – Completion of Kyūyō.
- 1846 – Dr. Bernard Jean Bettelheim (d. 1870), a Hungarian Protestant missionary serving with the Loochoo Naval Mission, arrives in Ryukyu Kingdom. He establishes the first foreign hospital on the island at the Naminoue Gokoku-ji Temple.
- 1852 – Commodore Matthew C. Perry of the US Navy visits the kingdom and establishes a coaling station in Naha.
- 1854 – Perry returns to Okinawa to sign the Loochoo Compact with the Ryukyuan government. Bettelheim leaves with Perry.
- 1866 – The last official mission from the Qing Empire visits the kingdom.
- 1872 – Emperor Meiji unilaterally declared the creation of Ryukyu Domain and appointed King Shō Tai as the "Domain Head of Ryukyu Domain".
- 1874 – The last tributary envoy to China is dispatched from Naha. / Kaiser Wilhelm I erects a "friendship monument" on Miyako Island. / Japan invades Taiwan on behalf of Ryukyu.
- 1879 – The Meji government abolished Ryukyu Domain and established Okinawa Prefecture. Shō Tai is forced to abdicate, but is granted the rank of marquis (侯爵, kōshaku) within the Meiji peerage system.

== Monarchy ==
=== Royal crest ===
The family crest of the Ryukyuan kings is called Mitsu-domoe and it is commonly used in Japan.

In Shintoism, Mitsu-domoe represents Emperor Ojin (Divine name Yahata). King Shō Toku worshipped Yahata and adapted the crest. He has also built the Asato Hachiman Shrine.

It is also said to be a balance of three forces, symbolizing the balance of Kitayama, Nakayama, and Nanzan.

=== List of Ryukyuan kings ===
Kings of Ryukyu Islands
Name	Chinese characters	Reign	Dynasty	Notes
Shunten	舜天 shuntin	1187–1237	Shunten dynasty	
Shunbajunki	舜馬順熈 shunbajunchi	1238–1248	Shunten dynasty	
Gihon	義本 gifun	1249–1259	Shunten dynasty	
Eiso	英祖 eeso	1260–1299	Eiso dynasty	
Taisei	大成 teeshii	1300–1308	Eiso dynasty	
Eiji	英慈 eeji	1309–1313	Eiso dynasty	

Kings of Chūzan
Tamagusuku	玉城 tamagushiku	1314–1336	Eiso dynasty	
Seii	西威 see-i	1337–1354	Eiso dynasty	
Satto	察度 sattu	1355–1397	Satto dynasty	
Bunei	武寧 bunii	1398–1406	Satto dynasty	
Shō Shishō	尚思紹 shoo shisoo	1407–1421	First Shō dynasty	
Shō Hashi	尚巴志 shoo hashii	1422–1429	First Shō dynasty	as King of Chūzan

Kings of Ryukyu
Name	Chinese characters	Reign	Line or dynasty	Notes
Shō Hashi	尚巴志 shoo hashii	1429–1439	First Shō dynasty	
Shō Chū	尚忠 shoo chuu	1440–1442	First Shō dynasty	
Shō Shitatsu	尚思達 shoo shitaa	1443–1449	First Shō dynasty	
Shō Kinpuku	尚金福 shoo chinfuku	1450–1453	First Shō dynasty	
Shō Taikyū	尚泰久 shoo teechuu	1454–1460	First Shō dynasty	
Shō Toku	尚徳 shoo tuku	1461–1469	First Shō dynasty	
Shō En	尚圓 shoo in	1470–1476	Second Shō dynasty	a.k.a. Kanemaru Uchima
Shō Sen'i	尚宣威 shoo shin-i	1477	Second Shō dynasty	
Shō Shin	尚真 shoo shin	1477–1526	Second Shō dynasty	
Shō Sei	尚清 shoo shii	1527–1555	Second Shō dynasty	
Shō Gen	尚元 shoo gwan	1556–1572	Second Shō dynasty	
Shō Ei	尚永 shoo ii	1573–1586	Second Shō dynasty	
Shō Nei	尚寧 shoo nii	1587–1620	Second Shō dynasty	ruled during Satsuma invasion; first king to be Satsuma vassal
Shō Hō	尚豊 shoo fuu	1621–1640	Second Shō dynasty	
Shō Ken	尚賢 shoo chin	1641–1647	Second Shō dynasty	
Shō Shitsu	尚質 shoo shichi	1648–1668	Second Shō dynasty	
Shō Tei	尚貞 shoo tii	1669–1709	Second Shō dynasty	
Shō Eki	尚益 shoo ichi	1710–1712	Second Shō dynasty	
Shō Kei	尚敬 shoo chii	1713–1751	Second Shō dynasty	
Shō Boku	尚穆 shoo buku	1752–1795	Second Shō dynasty	
Shō On	尚温 shoo un	1796–1802	Second Shō dynasty	
Shō Sei (r. 1803)	尚成 shoo shii	1803	Second Shō dynasty	
Shō Kō	尚灝 shoo koo	1804–1828	Second Shō dynasty	
Shō Iku	尚育 shoo iku	1829–1847	Second Shō dynasty	
Shō Tai	尚泰 shoo tee	1848 – 11 March 1879	Second Shō dynasty	last King of Ryukyu (then Japanese Marquis 1884–1901)

== See also ==
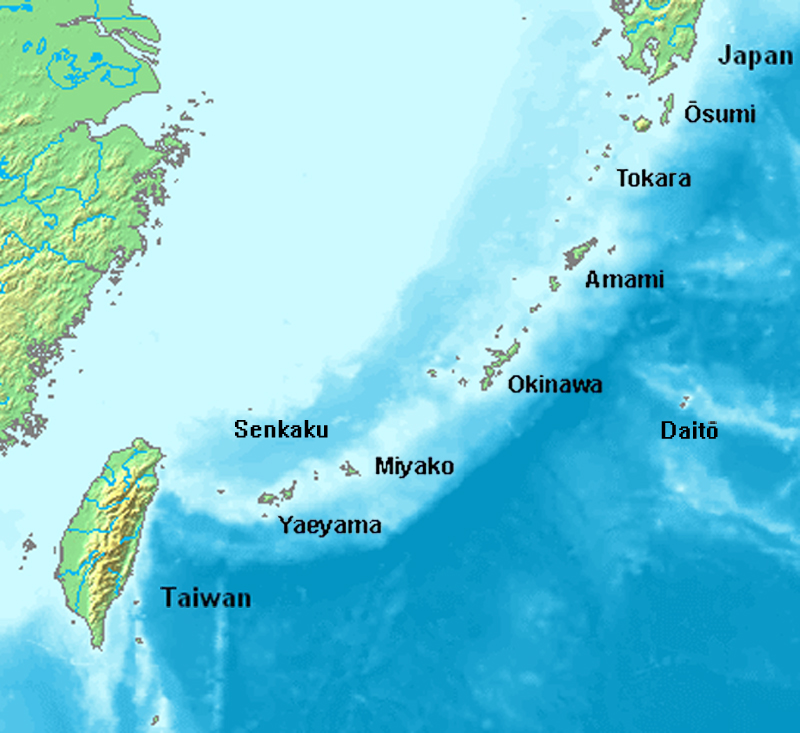
Location of the Ryukyu Islands

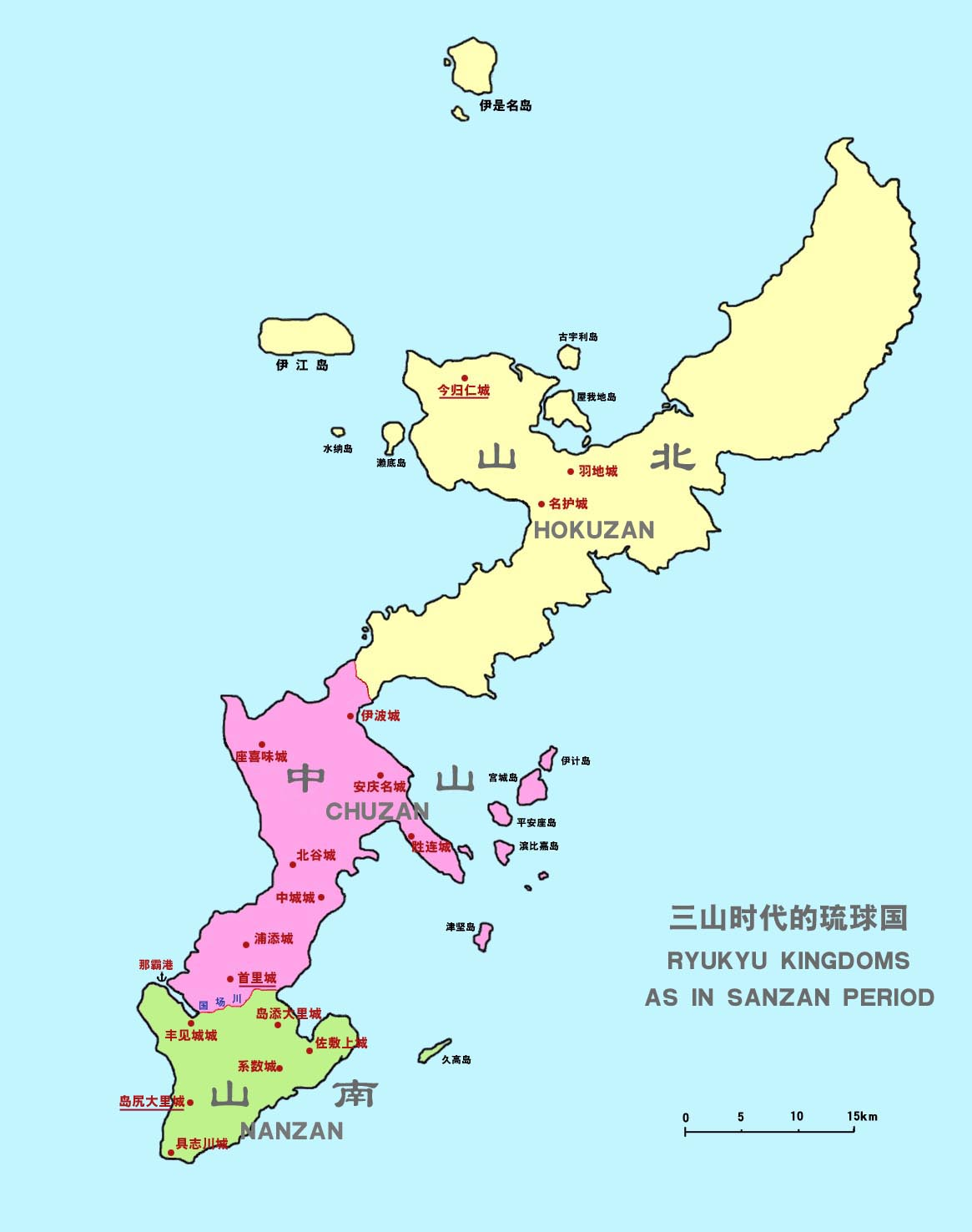
Hokuzan, Chūzan, Nanzan

- Foreign relations of the Ryukyu Kingdom
- Foreign relations of Imperial China
- Gusuku
- History of the Ryukyu Islands
- History of Sakishima Islands
- Hua–Yi distinction
- Mudan Incident of 1871
- Military of the Ryukyu Kingdom
- Ryukyu independence movement
- Ryukyu Islands
- Ryukyuan missions to Edo
- Ryukyuan missions to Imperial China
- Ryukyuan missions to Joseon
  - Joseon missions to the Ryukyu Kingdom
  - Imperial Chinese missions to the Ryukyu Kingdom
- Tamaudun (intact royal tombs)
- Okinawan martial arts
- Names of Ryukyu
