= Rekidai Hōan =

Compilation of diplomatic documents of the royal government of the Ryūkyū Kingdom

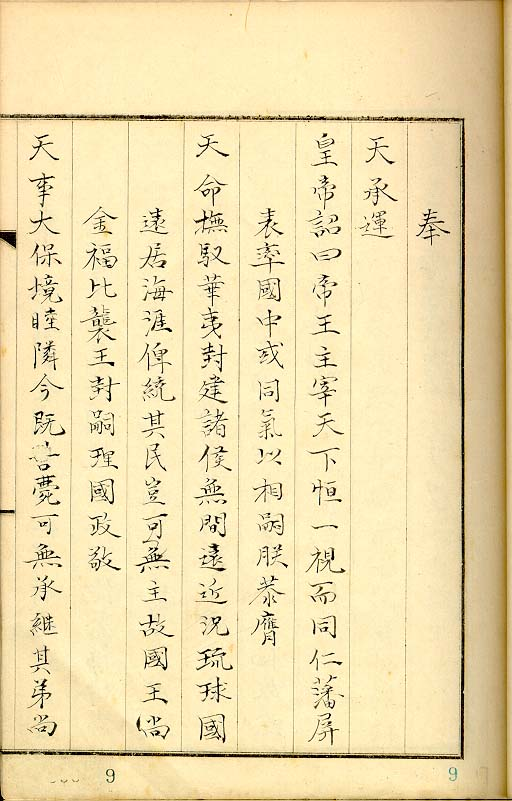
Rekidai Hōan

The Rekidai Hōan (歴代宝案; lit. "Precious Documents of Successive Generations"), is an official compilation of diplomatic documents of the royal government of the Ryūkyū Kingdom. Covering the period from 1424 to 1867, it contains records, written entirely in Chinese, of communications between Ryukyu and ten different trading partners in this period, detailing as well the gifts given in tribute. The ten countries or trading ports are China, Korea, Siam, Malacca, Palembang, Java, Sumatra, Pattani, and Sunda Kelapa. There are 242 volumes in total, including four lists, and an extra four sections.

It is believed that the documents were first formally compiled in 1697 from documents kept at the Naha Tempi Palace. Some documents were already lost at this time, and copies contained errors. It is not known whether the documents had been kept separately or bound prior to this.

The compilation first became known to the public, and put on display, in 1932, when it was moved from the Tenson Shrine in Naha to the Okinawa Prefectural Library. This "First Series" compiled in 1697 contained 49 volumes, but by 1932 a number were missing or severely damaged. All were destroyed in the 1945 battle of Okinawa.

Copies in Taiwan University and Tokyo University survived, and form the basis for scholarship of these documents; unfortunately, further copying errors were introduced in the 1930s-1940s when these versions were created.
