= Gregory Smits =

American historian (born 1960)

Gregory James Smits (born 1960) is an American historian, academic, writer and Japanologist. He is a professor of Japanese history at Pennsylvania State University. Many of Smits' works focus on Ryukyuan history.

== Early life ==
Smits was born in Columbia, Missouri. He earned a BA from the University of Florida in 1983. He was awarded a master's degree from the University of Hawaiʻi at Manoa. The University of Southern California granted his Ph.D.

== Select works ==
Smit's published writings encompass 8 works in 18 publications in 2 languages and 1,101 library holdings.

- The sages' scale in Japan: Nakae Tōju (1608-1648) and situational weighing, 1991
- Visions of Ryukyu identity and ideology in early-modern thought and politics, 1999
- Jahana Noboru: Ikinawan activist and scholar, 2002
- The politics of culture in early twentieth century Okinawa, 2006
- Economic thought in early modern Japan, 2010
- Maritime Ryukyu, 1050–1650, 2018
- Early Ryukyuan History: A New Model, 2024
- The Ryukyu Islands: A New History from the Stone Age to the Present, 2025
