= Bunei =

Bunei 武寧 bunii

King of Chūzan
- Reign: 1398–1406
- Predecessor: Satto
- Successor: Shishō
- Born: 1356
- Died: 1406?
- Issue: Kanneishiketsu (完寧斯結)
- Divine name: Naga-no-mamono (中之真物 nakanu mamun)
- Father: Satto

Bunei (武寧; 1356 – c.1406) was King of Chūzan from 1398 to 1406. He was the second and last ruler of the Satto dynasty.

== Biography ==
Bunei inherited the throne upon the death of his father, King Satto. His reign saw the continuation of many of the previous trends and developments; in particular, Bunei sought to continue to develop commercial ties between Ryūkyū and China. A special headquarters was built in Naha for Chinese envoys and similar missions, and a trading center was established nearby. In addition, the royal annals began to be compiled; the Rekidai Hoan (Treasury of Royal Succession) was first compiled in 1403.

This period saw a great proliferation of trade and cultural interaction between the three Okinawan polities and other states in the region; sources seem to indicate, however, that only Chūzan successfully established relations with the Ashikaga shogunate of Japan in this period. An embassy was sent to Siam in 1409, and relations with kingdoms in Java and Sumatra remained strong, having been established some time earlier by traders. All three kings of Okinawan, Chūzan, Sanhoku, and Sannan, sent emissaries to Korea in 1397, likely separately, and established strong friendly relations with the newly formed Joseon dynasty. From Korea, Chūzan saw a great influx of Buddhist ideas and objects, and it is believed that Shintō first entered Okinawa in a significant way at this time as well, from Japan.

Naha became the busiest port on the island at this time, bringing wealth and prestige to Chūzan over its neighboring polities, and enhancing already heightened tensions. The Kings of Sanhoku and Sannan died around the same time as Bunei's father Satto, and since China never recognized more than one chief (or prince, in the Chinese view) of Okinawa, all three clamored to be officially invested by the Chinese Imperial Court as the sole ruler of all of Okinawa. However, due to the recent chaos in Nanking, which was taken by force by Zhu Di, installing himself as Ming Emperor, Bunei's request lay unanswered for eleven years. A missive was finally sent in 1406.

Meanwhile, a local lord (anji) named Hashi led a small rebellion in 1402, and brought down the lord of Azato district, near the site of the Chūzan palace at Urasoe. It is not clear exactly what discussions took place inside the royal court, or what actions were considered, but nothing was done for five years. On 30 January 1406, the Yongle Emperor Zhu Dhi expressed horror when the Ryukyuans castrated some of their own children to become eunuchs to serve in the Ming imperial palace. The emperor said that the boys who were castrated were innocent and did not deserve castration, and he returned the boys to Ryukyu and instructed them not to send eunuchs again. This faux pas committed by Bunei contributed to, if not resulted in, Shō Hashi's coup. Less than one year after Bunei was officially recognized as King of Chūzan by China, Hashi led a larger rebellion, ousting Bunei and establishing Shō Shishō, Hashi's father, as King of Chūzan. Though records do not indicate the details of Bunei's fate, it is likely that he either died at the hands of the rebels, or escaped to some distant island to live out the rest of his days in relative solitude.

== See also ==
- Imperial Chinese missions to the Ryukyu Kingdom

== Notes ==
Regnal titles
Preceded by Satto	King of Chūzan; 1398–1406	Succeeded by Shō Shishō
