= Omoro Sōshi =

Ancient poems from Okinawa

The Omoro Sōshi (おもろさうし; Okinawan: Umuru U-Sōshi, Northern Ryukyuan: おもろおさうし Omoro O-Saushi) is a compilation of ancient poems and songs from Okinawa and the Amami Islands, collected into 22 volumes and written primarily in hiragana with some simple kanji. There are 1,553 poems in the collection, but many are repeated; the number of unique pieces is 1,144.

The hiragana used, however, is a traditional orthography which associates different sounds to the characters than their normal Japanese readings, due to it originally being based on an earlier stage of Northern Ryukyuan that has not yet undergone vowel raising characteristic of the modern languages. The characters used to write omoro, for example (おもろ), would be written this same way, but pronounced as umuru in Okinawan.

The poetry contained in the volumes extends from the 12th century, or possibly earlier, to some composed by the Queen of Shō Nei (1589–1619). Though formally composed and recorded at these times, most if not all are believed to derive from far earlier traditions, as a result of their language, style, and content. The poems contained in the compilation vary, but follow a general pattern of celebrating famous heroes of the past, from poets and warriors to kings and voyagers. A few are love poems. They range from two verses to forty, some making extensive use of rhyme and couplet structures.

More than 80% of the words used in Omoro are common with the Yamato language and were used in the Muromachi period. This usage of language indicates that the people who carried Omoro poems were those who migrated south from Yamato to Okinawa in the late Heian to Muromachi periods.

== Etymology ==
Sōshi (草紙) means collection of stories, as medieval Japanese books like Makurano Soshi, Otogi Zoshi have Soshi in the title. but the origins and meaning of the term "omoro" are more elusive. Iha Fuyū was among the scholars who traced it to various words associated with oracles and divine songs. He further derived the term as referring to omori, a Ryukyuan word for sacred groves. Nakahara Zenchū, on the other hand, traced it back to the Ryukyuan umuru, or umui, which comes from mainland Japanese omoi (思い) meaning "to think" or to "feel".

Regardless of the true meaning or origins of the term, however, a basic cloud of meanings is nevertheless apparent. The omoro sōshi, a "compilation of thoughts" or of collective memory, is also associated with sacred groves and with divine songs.

== History ==
The omoro, as a form, are said to be the predecessors in Ryukyuan culture to distinct forms of music, dance, and literature; they incorporate all three of these. Only after centuries of development, and influence from China, Japan, and various South Seas cultures, did distinct traditions of music, dance, and literature develop, literature being the only one to be recorded with any consistency. Outside of what might be inferred or reconstructed from the Omoro Sōshi, no record survives today of earlier forms of Ryukyuan music and dance.

Though reflective of ancient folk traditions, the poetry also reflects the intricate links the Ryukyus enjoyed with other nearby states. Many of the Ryukyuan islands, largely culturally and linguistically isolated, are mentioned, along with various locations in Japan, China, Southeast Asia, and the South Seas.

The Omoro Sōshi was first compiled in 1531, and again in 1613 and 1623, as part of attempts by the royal government to secure their cultural or spiritual legitimacy and power. The first compilation came just after the reign of Shō Shin, who consolidated, centralized, and reformed the government, and the second came just after Ryukyu became a direct vassal to Satsuma. At both times, cultural and ideological means, as well as more mundane political ones, were needed to ensure unity and to maintain a connection to tradition and history.

Only a small handful of scholars has studied the documents in any significant depth. The vast changes in Ryukyuan culture and language over the last several centuries have made the poetry difficult to access and understand, and Iha Fuyū (d. 1947) and Nakahara Zenchū (d. 1964) were among the only ones to extensively study it. Iha, Nakahara, and several others have used the compilation as a basis for research into ancient Ryukyuan customs and society. Thorough analysis has yielded elements of a foundation of understanding of ancient governance, social structures, and folk religion, but it cannot be expected that a comprehensive understanding may be derived from the material.
