= Chatan Castle =

Castle site in Okinawa, Japan

Chatan Castle 北谷城 Chatan gusuku
- Chatan, Okinawa
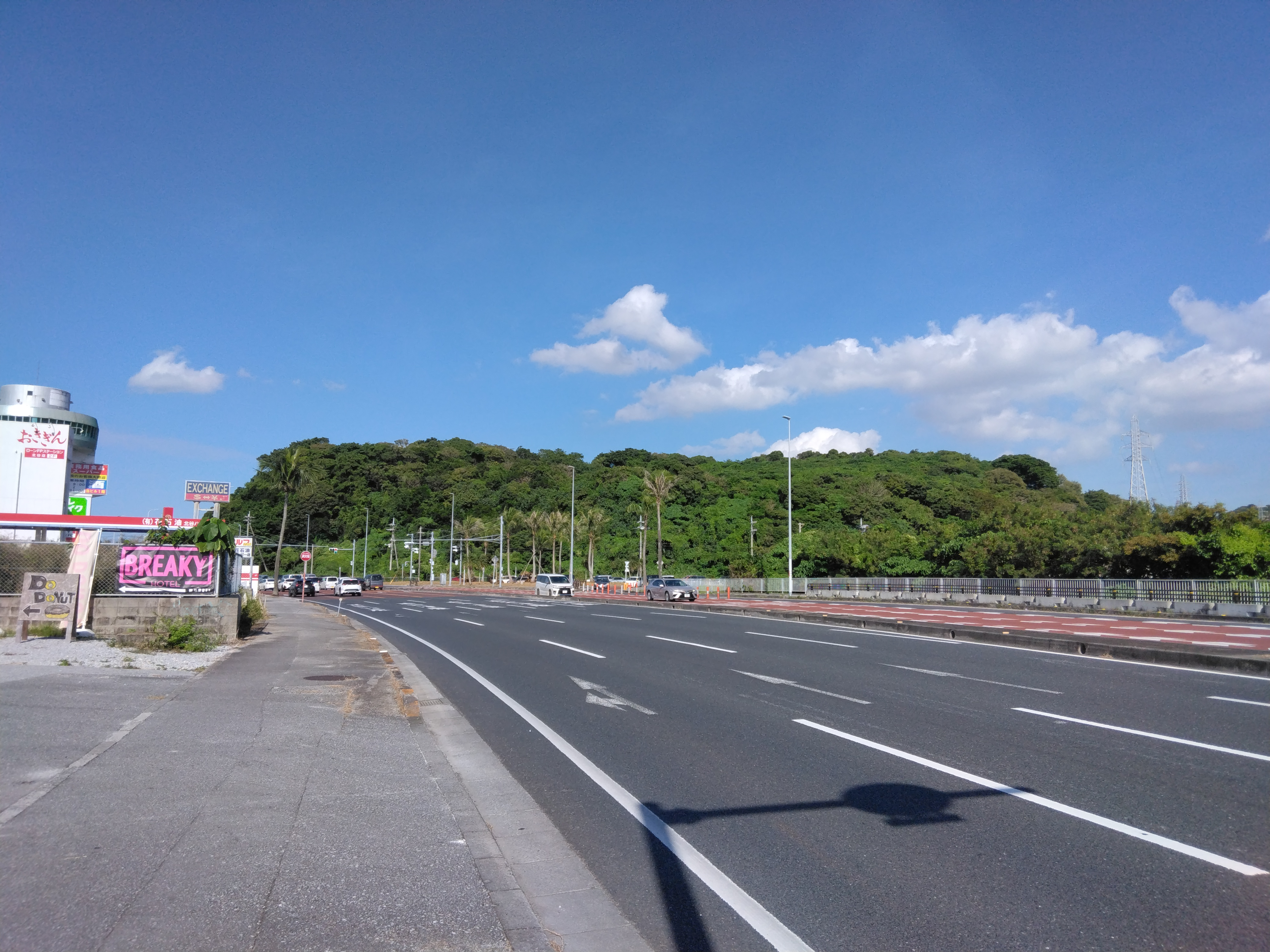
- Chatan Gusuku

Site information
- Type: Gusuku
- Controlled by: Kaniman (13th century-14th century) Ūkā Aji / Ōkawa Aji; Tancha Aji; Ūkā Aji / Ōkawa Aji; Chatan Aji / Chatan Ōkawa Aji Ryūkyū Kingdom (15th century–1609)
- Open to the public: No
- Condition: Ruins
- Website: Chatan Town cultural properties

Location
- Coordinates: 26.30947°N 127.76698°E

Site history
- Built: 13th century
- Built by: Kaniman Aji, Ōkawa Aji
- In use: 13th century-17th century
- Materials: Ryukyuan limestone, wood
- Battles/wars: Ōkawa tekiuchi Satsuma Invasion

Chatan Castle (Japanese: 北谷城跡, romanized: Chatan jōato), or Chatan Gusuku (Okinawan: 北谷城, romanized: Chatan gusuku) is a Ryūkyūan gusuku located in Chatan, Okinawa.

It was built on a Ryūkyū limestone hill topping at an altitude of 44.7 metres, and consists in five enclosures for a total area of 16,600 square metres. It is naturally protected by a cliff 10 to 20 metres high on the north and a two-stepped cliff on the south, with the Shirahi-gawa River running westward at the foot of the northern cliff.

It was an important fortress of the Chūzan kingdom between the second half of the 13th century and the first half of the 16th century. It is the fifth largest gusuku on Okinawa Island, after Shuri, Nakijin, Itokazu and Nanzan.After WWII, it was included in the land seized for Camp Zukeran. It was only returned to Chatan Town on 31 March 2020. Access is still strictly controlled by the Japanese Defense Bureau. Since the destruction of Ichi Gusuku, Chatan Gusuku is the only gusuku in Chatan Town.

It has been designated as a National Historic Site in 2020.

== Location ==
Address: 904-0107 Okinawa, Chatan, Ōmura, Gusukubaru. Coordinates: 26.30947°N 127.76698°E

Chatan Gusuku is located in Chatan, a town on the western coast of Okinawa Island. It is located slightly south of the centre of the town, facing the coast, on a limestone hill extending east-west by the estuary of the Shirahi-gawa River. The hill is about 500 metres long, 150 metres wide and 44 metres high. The surrounding landscape has been heavily modified by the installation of Camp Zukeran. It is currently bordered on the north by the Shirahi-gawa River, on the west by National Route 58 and on the south by National Route 130.

Before WWII it was surrounded by the settlements of Kuwae (on the north), Chatan, Rindō and Tamēshi (on the south). The western tip of the hill was graded in order to build National Route 58.

The closest gusuku (at the exception of Ichi Gusuku, that was an outpost of Chatan Gusuku) is Hini Gusuku located 3 kilometres eastward in Kitanakagusuku. Hini Gusuku also yielded material of the transition between the Late Kaizuka period and the beginning of the Gusuku period and its development seems contemporaneous of Chatan Gusuku.

== History ==
=== Outline ===
Chatan Gusuku was a fortress of Chūzan that was in use between the second half of the 13th century during the Gusuku period and the first half of the 17th century in the Kingdom period. Unlike most of the gusukus, it continued being used even during the Second Shō Dynasty. It was also called Ūkā Gusuku / Ōkawa Gusuku (Japanese: 大川グスク) and functioned with an outpost on the other side of the Shirahi-gawa River, Ichi Gusuku (Japanese: 池グスク). It seems to have lost its function as regional administrative centre when Chatan Banju Guards House (Japanese: 北谷番所) was built at the foot of the hill at the end of the 15th century.
The gusuku was deserted a few decades later in the 16th century but kept a defensive aspect that was used in the resistance of the kingdom against the Satsuma invasion in 1609. The gusuku afterwards kept its role as a religious centre, and became a location for funerary purposes as can be seen by the eighty-two tombs identified in its cliffs.

=== Gusuku period ===
There is no historical document related to the construction of Chatan Gusuku, but several oral traditions compiled at a later stage exist.

The first lord of Chatan Gusuku is remembered as Kaniman Aji (Japanese: 金満按司), which is a common name attributed to people related to iron smithing at the beginning of the Gusuku period on Okinawa Island. The Ryūkyū-sosen hōkan (Japanese: 琉球祖先寳鑑), published in 1933 by Chitoku Keruma (Japanese: 慶留間知徳) mentions that during the reign of King Eiso (1229-1299), the eldest son of the household of Chatan Noro was named Kaniman Aji.
A tomb that is traditionally attributed to Kaniman Aji exists in a cave on the northern cliff, facing Shirahi-gawa River. People who took refuge into the tomb during WWII report that there was a large quantity of human bones inside, suggesting it was a collective tomb. The inscription on the stele in front of the tomb said "The generations of the historical lords of Chatan Gusuku, Kaniman Aji's Sacred Tomb", suggesting that several generations of lords referred to as Kaniman Aji were buried there.

Tradition says that (the last) Kaniman Aji was defeated by Ūkā Aji (Ōkawa Aji) (Japanese: 大川按司), who was in turn defeated by Tancha Ufunushi (lit. "the great lord of Tancha") (Japanese: 谷茶大主), before Ūkā Aji's son came to power again when his father's former followers defeated Tancha Ufunushi. Those conflicts are the subject of the kumiodori play The revenge of Ōkawa (Japanese: 大川敵討, romanized: Ōkawa tekiuchi/Ūkā tichiuchi).

Since all those names are titles transmitted from father to son, it is not clear how many generations of Kaniman Aji or Ūkā Aji actually dwelt in Chatan Gusuku. Moreover, the genealogical documents of several old houses of Chatan claim that they are descendants of both Kaniman Aji and Ūkā Aji, so that there is a theory that they were in fact related, if not the same person.

Ūkā Aji is at the origin of the other name of Chatan Gusuku, Ūkā Gusuku (Ūkā, lit. "large river", is another name of Shirahi-gawa River). This family seems to have been the main builders of Chatan Gusuku during the 14th and 15th century. Given the size of the gusuku, it is thought the Ūkā Aji family was particularly powerful.
It is not clear what happened after this period of struggle for the dominance of the area, but during the reign of Shō Shin (around 1500), the lord of Chatan Magiri was known under the name of Chatan Aji (sometimes Chatan Ōkawa Aji). It is not clear if the persons referred to as Chatan Aji are direct descendants of the Ūkā Aji family.

The fifteenth volume of the Omoro Sōshi (compiled in 1623) mentions the lords of Chatan Gusuku as "kitatan-no-teda" (15/55, 56) and "kitatan-no-yo-no-nushi" (15/57, 58), meaning respectively "the sun of Chatan" and "the world-lord of Chatan". Those terms are commonly applied to kings in the same book, showing that the lords of Chatan were probably particularly powerful.
It is not possible to know of which of the ajis the Omoro Sōshi refers to.

=== Kingdom period ===
During the Satsuma invasion of 1609, Chatan Gusuku was held by Yō Chōhō Sashiki Chikudun Kōdō, (Note: Yō is the clan name, Chōhō his Chinese-style given name. Sashiki is a place name. Chikudun is a nobility rank. Kōdō is his Japanese-style name. See Okinawan name#Historical names) who opposed a strong resistance to the invader. He was still fighting and holding his position when he heard that Shuri had fallen, and he committed suicide out of sorrow. His tomb is also located on the northern cliff of Chatan Gusuku. During this resistance, the outpost of Chatan Gusuku located on the other bank of the Shirahi-gawa River, Ichi Gusuku, also played a large role.

After the invasion, the fortress was completely abandoned and part of its lands inside the enclosures were used as agricultural fields. When Ichi-gusuku-bashi Bridge (Japanese: 池城橋, romanized: Ichi-gusuku-bashi) was rebuilt in stone in 1821, stones from Chatan Gusuku walls were used. It is also said that those stones had been used for the construction of Machinato-bashi Bridge (Japanese: 牧港橋, romanized: Machinato-bashi) as well.

=== Reversion and designation ===
After WWII, the area of Chatan Gusuku was seized by the U.S. Forces and became part of Camp Zukeran (later renamed Camp Foster). On 5 April 2013, the Consolidation Plan for Facilities and Areas in Okinawa decided that Camp Foster would be comprised in the seized lands that should be returned to Okinawa "after 2019". This reversion was to take place gradually and the area comprising Chatan Gusuku was planned to be returned to Japan in 2020.

The area was finally reverted to Japan on 31 March 2020, but access is still strictly controlled by the Japanese Defense Bureau. Chatan Gusuku was designated a National Historic Site on 20 Novembre 2020.

Chatan Town is currently pushing for the creation of an historical park that would showcase the archaeological remains.

== Archaeological remains ==
=== Before the construction of the fortress ===
There was a village located on the hill of Chatan Gusuku before it became a fortress at the transition between the pre-agricultural Late Kaizuka period and the agricultural Gusuku period, before and during the 12th century. The site has yielded number of postholes and artefacts of this period, starting with locally produced flat constricted bottom pottery.
Only a few other gusukus are known with an occupation of the Late Kaizuka period preceding their transformation into a fortress: Gushikawa Gusuku (Japanese: 具志川城) and Katsuren Gusuku (Japanese: 勝連城) in central Okinawa and Gushichan Gusuku (Japanese: 具志頭城) in southern Okinawa.

As seen from the representative artefacts, the chronology at the transition between the Late Kaizuka and the Early Gusuku periods in Okinawa Island generally goes from the locally produced flat constricted bottom pottery at the beginning of the 12th century to the "early Gusuku set" in the 12th to 13th centuries (fragments of talc pots, Chinese white porcelain and Kamuiyaki ware), before it shifts to imported celadon in the 13th century. The remains on the hill of Chatan Gusuku go directly from the Late Kaizuka period local pottery to imported celadon. A few 13th century celadon sherds have been found, but most are dated of the 14th and 15th century.

The quantity of imported material of the 12th and 13th century in the lowland sites such as Kumuibaru and Kushikanikubaru is on the over hand overwhelming, leaving no doubt that the power centre had not been established yet on the hill at that time.

=== Chatan Gusuku's fortress ===
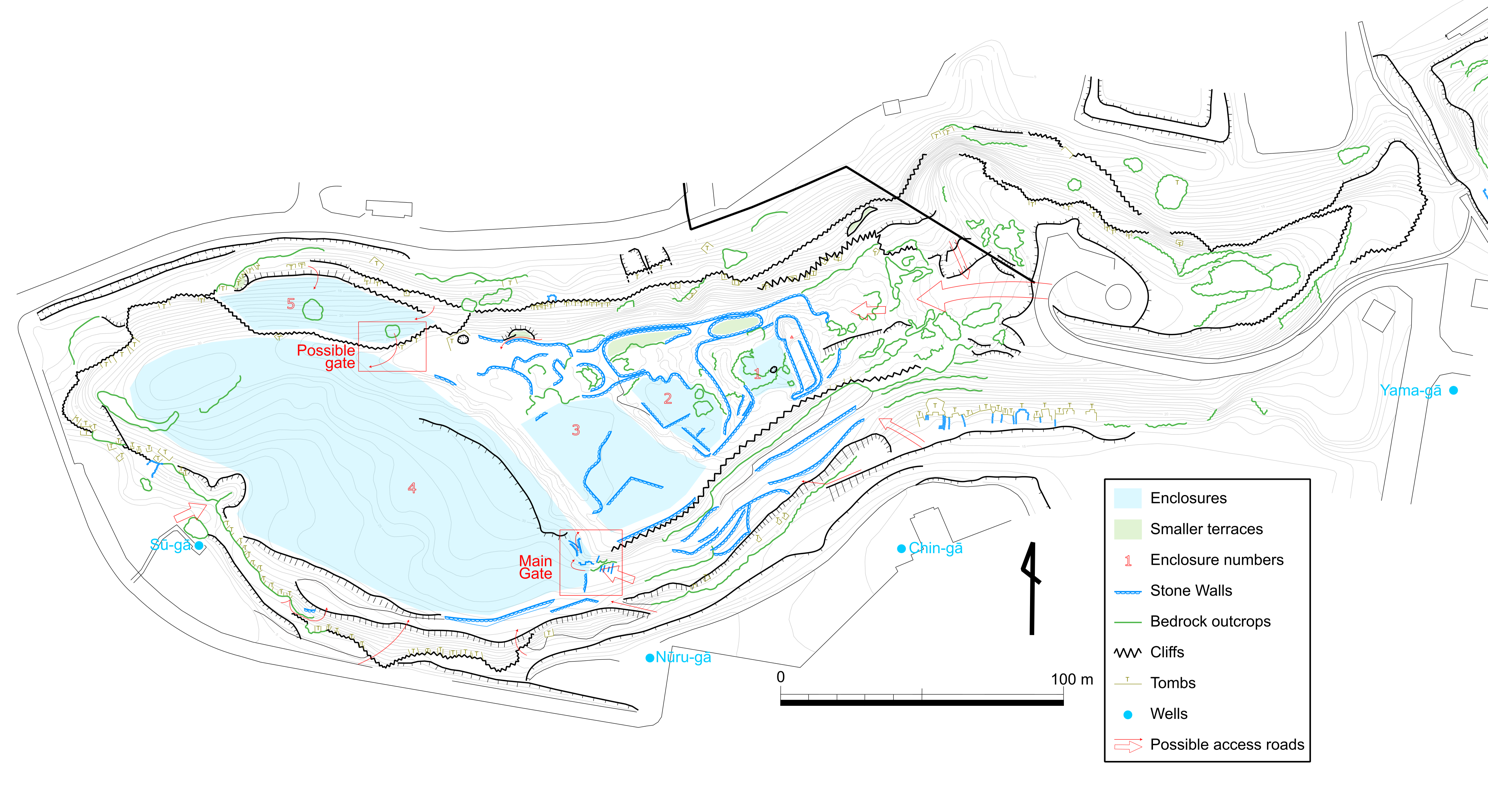
Map of Chatan Gusuku

The fortress makes use of a natural limestone hill by the estuary of Shirahi-gawa River from which you can see Nakagusuku Gusuku, Urasoe Gusuku and Shuri Gusuku. The river is particularly wide at this location, and the cliff particularly steep. There used to be two smaller hills on the east, that were all linked by a ridge path. The two smaller hills disappeared in the landscape modifications by the U.S. Forces after WWII and Chatan Gusuku appears as a single hill dominating the landscape.
Excavations have shown that in the 12th century, the ocean came as far inland as the foot of Chatan Gusuku.

The gusuku comprises five enclosures all quite well conserved. The enclosures are numbered 1 to 4 from East to West, with Enclosure 5 north of Enclosure 4. Enclosure 1 is at the highest point of the gusuku, the altitude getting lower going westward. The enclosures are defined by flattened areas surrounded by partitions made by filling the gaps into the natural limestone outcrops with stone walls. This construction of the gusuku, with very limited modification of the natural landscape, is one of the characteristics of Chatan Gusuku. Since the limestone outcrops are less present in the lower enclosures, the proportion of stone walls in the enclosure walls increases from Enclosure 1 to Enclosure 4. The walls are better conserved on the eastern side of the gusuku. Some of the stone walls are conserved up to 1.5 metres high, and can be up to 9 metres wide. The walls are in rubble or ashlar masonry, the ashlars being made in some of the walls of limestone, in some others of stony coral.

The different ajis mentioned in the history paragraph are thought to have built the fortress gradually between the 13th and the 14th centuries. Most of the archaeological remains unearthed are dated of the 14th and 15th centuries. The main residential building that has been found in Enclosure 2 seem to have been first built at the very beginning of the 15th century.

Three different routes leading to the gusuku (all including clear anthropic modifications of the landscape to ease progression) have been identified: one from the south, one from the north and one from the east. There are nowadays other ways to enter the gusuku but none of them include archaeological remains that would confirm that they were used during the Gusuku or Kingdom periods.

The southern route is probably the official one: the path is wide and can be used by several persons at the same time. It leads into Enclosure 4, from which it turns westward to what was probably the main gate in the wall of Enclosure 3. It is called "the Noro's path" since it was used until WWII by Chatan Noro when she was going to the praying sites inside the gusuku.

The northern path, through Enclosure 5, is steeper and can only be walked by one person at a time. Several artificial flat areas and slopes have been created to ease progression, it probably requested the use of a ladder at one point. It leads to the northwestern corner of Enclosure 3 where an overhanging gate might have been built. It would have been the most direct access from Shirahi-gawa River and an important gate for trade.

The eastern path is very wide as well and goes from the neighbouring hill on the east side of the gusuku directly to behind Enclosure 1. Most of it has disappeared in the post-war landscape modification by the U.S. Forces.

==== Enclosure 1 ====
Enclosure 1 on the east is the highest (44.72 m) and smallest (800 square metres, 40 x 20 metres) of the enclosures. All the other enclosures develop west of this one. The first enclosure of a gusuku is generally named uuchibaru and is the location of the lord's residence. However, no remains of residential buildings have been found in the first enclosure of Chatan Gusuku and its function remains unclear.

Most of the area inside Enclosure 1 consists in bedrock outcrops. The limestone has been graded in order to create a level area. The actual area flat enough to be of any use does not exceed 60 square metres. There is a small terrace associated with this enclosure on the northern side.

A stone wall about 25 metres long runs north-south on the eastern side of the enclosure. Its internal facing, on the west, is in rubble masonry. It presents two external facings on the east in ashlar masonry, possibly due to an enlargement of the wall from 6 metres wide to 9 metres. Given this width it is thought the original wall was quite high, probably more than 4 metres. This is the only side of the gusuku that is not protected by a cliff, which probably explains the width and supposed height of the wall. It is protected about 50 metres on the east by a L-shaped depression about 8 metres long that is probably the remains of a defensive ditch to prevent incursions from the Shirahi-gawa River at the place where the cliff is the easiest to climb. It was dug during the Gusuku period and started being filled by the 16th century after the abandon of the gusuku as a fortress. There are several small terraces on the slope going down to the river, probably set there with a defensive purpose. The hill on the east, known as Agari Gusuku ("the eastern gusuku") is thought to have been fortified as well to defend the eastern wall of the gusuku. This hill is currently occupied by a water tank set by the US Forces.

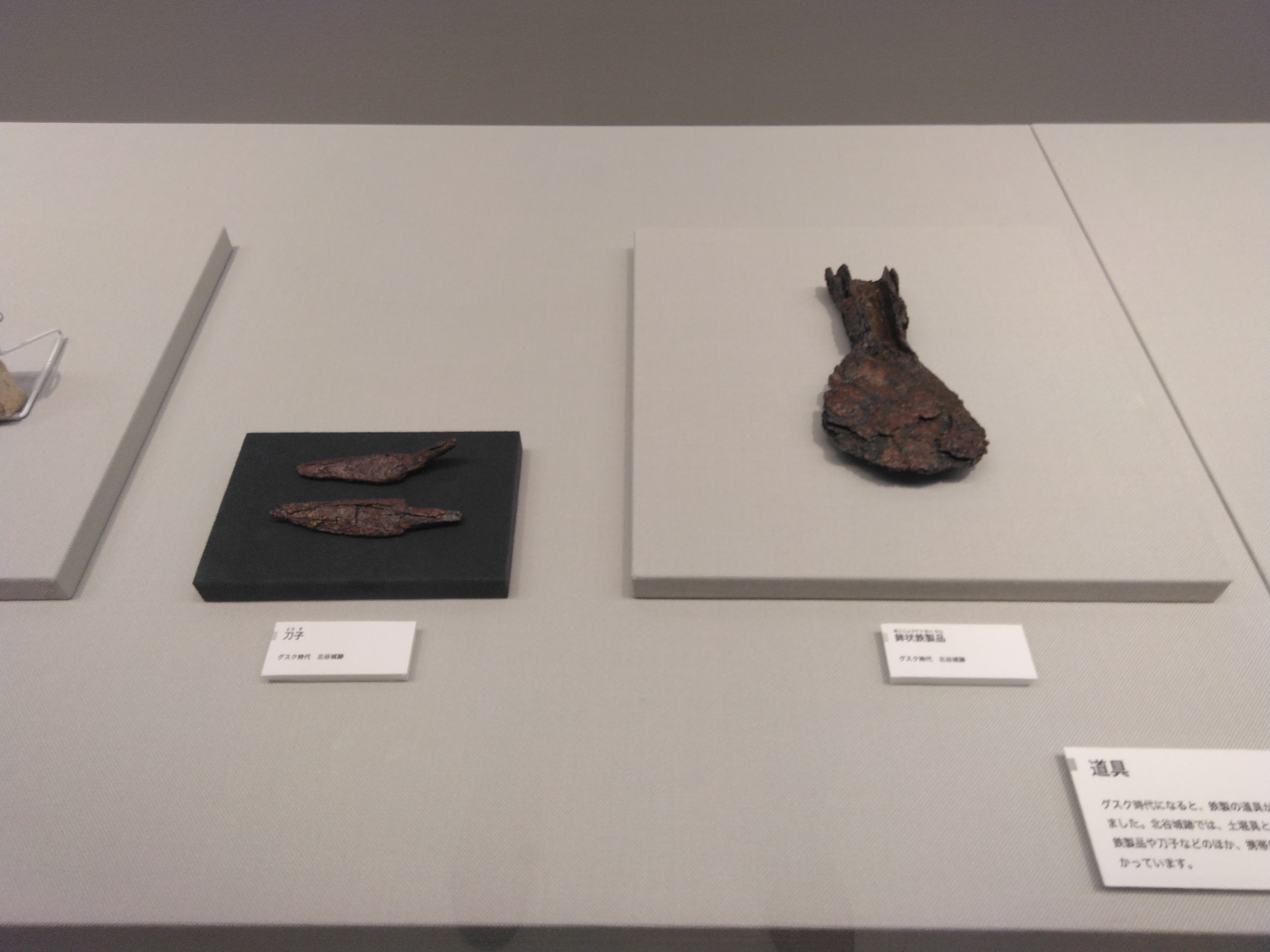
Iron arrowheads from Chatan Gusuku

Several stone projectiles and arrowheads were found along the eastern wall of Enclosure 1, suggesting that battles actually took place at this location.

Most of the boundary between Enclosure 1 and Enclosure 2 on the west is marked by natural limestone outcrops, completed on the south by a stone wall with its basement in cut stones.

A depression, about 1.5 metres in diameter and 1.5 metres deep, is said to have been used as a water tank.

==== Enclosure 2 ====
Enclosure 2 is 1500 square metres large (30 x 50 metres), gently slanting southwestward. Bedrock outcrops are numerous in this enclosure as well, and the flat area that can be practically used for human activities does not exceed 280 square metres, but there is a secondary terrace associated with this enclosure on the northern side.

It was the location of the main residential building of the gusuku.

The southern and eastern corners of the walls surrounding the enclosure have been excavated, as well as a large part of the southwestern and southeastern walls.

The southeastern stone wall showed rounded corners, it was conserved with its lining of coral stone ashlars on the internal side, but only the foundation stone course remained on the external side. It made use of 80 cm large limestone ashlars on its western side and 30 cm large coral ashlars on its eastern side.

The southwestern stone wall made use of ashlars of coral or limestone about 45 cm large.

There is no identifiable time difference between the construction of the parts of the walls in limestone and the ones in coral: they are all built atop the same stone foundations. Those stone foundations have been set on a layer of compacted earth. On several locations only the foundation stones remain, the cut stone above having probably been reused in the construction of later stone structures after the gusuku was abandoned. This is why it is difficult to formally identify the location of the gate for this enclosure.

Enclosure 2 includes two gravel pavements (one in the northwestern corner and one in the southwestern one), a stone alignment, the foundations of what is interpreted as the main residential building and postholes.

Both the northern and the southern gravel pavements are made of table coral and stony coral crushed into gravels a few centimetres in diameter and spread on the ground. It is thought the coral was crushed on site. The local limestone bedrock, outcropping at immediate proximity, was not used. The pavements are thought to have been in use during the Gusuku period. The northern gravel pavement has been damaged by shelling during WWII.

The stone alignment is located in the southern part of the enclosure. It is made of ashlars and it runs perpendicularly to the western stone wall. It might be related to the gate of Enclosure 2.

The main building remains include a 9.8 metres long stone alignment that is interpreted as the rain water drain of the residence, made in coral limestone ashlars, and an area enclosed by limestone cobbles extending north of this drain. Those remains are not aligned with the walls of the enclosure. The cobbles have been spread in a depression of the ground in order to flatten it to serve as foundations for a building. The artefacts (of the 14th and 15th centuries) recovered from Enclosure 2 are concentrating in this building remains. The layer below the cobbles contains a large quantity of charcoal, ashes, burnt stones and fragmented artefacts, suggesting that the gusuku was at least once destroyed by fire.

The lowest cultural layer yielded postholes, about 50 to 60 centimetres in diameter and 30 centimetres deep, many showing postmolds or stone packing. They were only disclosed in the parts of the enclosure where the absence of remains from the Gusuku and Kingdom periods permitted to dig deeper to the older layers.

==== Enclosure 3 ====
Enclosure 3 is 3200 square metres large (40 x 80 metres), with a cliff about 2 metres high between Enclosure 2 and Enclosure 3. There is far less bedrock outcrops in this part of the gusuku and most of the enclosure is flat enough to be used. It concentrated until WWII a lot of sacred sites and it is thought it might have been related to religious activities as well during the gusuku's period of use as a fortress.
Excavation of the western part of the enclosure has shown that very thick (up to 1.8 metre) earth deposits had been spread in Enclosure 3 by the wall between Enclosure 3 and Enclosure 4, to flatten the land. The material retrieved from those earth deposits include a large quantity of flat constricted bottom pottery sherds and very little celadon or porcelain, showing that this probably date of the very beginning of the rise to power of the local ajis, by the second half of the 13th century.

The western corner of Enclosure 3 has yielded very early Chinese blue-and-white porcelain and several Chinese coins, including one minted between 1102 and 1106 during the Chongqing era. Most of the celadon is dated of the 14th and 15th century but there are a few pieces of the Southern Song dynasty (12th-13th century).

A large quantity of charred material also suggested a destruction by fire. Those charred remains included large quantities of barley, wheat and rice, that were dated of the 13th to 14th centuries.

Most of the walls of Enclosure 3 have not been surveyed yet, but excavations were held at the locations of two of the gates of the gusuku: the main gate at the southern corner of the enclosure, and the river side gate at the western corner. The cliff between Enclosure 3 and Enclosure 4 is 3 to 4 metres high and the stone wall between Enclosure 3 and Enclosure 4 presents two protrusions into Enclosure 4. The northern wall of the enclosure, located just over the tomb attributed to Kaniman Aji, is made in rubble masonry.

Enclosure 3 includes a path, a squared flat area surrounded by a stone wall, a slope with steps and stone pavements.
The path, called "the Noro's path", was unearthed in the southern part of the enclosure. It is said to have been used until WWII by Chatan Noro when she was visiting the ritual sites.

The squared flat area surrounded by a stone wall lay by the centre of the enclosure. There, the second excavation survey disclosed a pavement made of about 10 cm large limestone cobbles, incense burners and alcohol ceramic bottles. It was concluded this was one of the sacred sites known to have existed in Enclosure 3, and it was identified as the one called "Gusuku-nai-nu-tun" that is mentioned in the Ryūkyū-koku yurai-ki, a sacred site under the jurisdiction of Chatan Noro.

The slope leads from the flat area of Enclosure 3 to the southwestern corner of the wall surrounding Enclosure 2. The slope is artificial and presents parallel alignments of stones that could be the remains of stairs leading to the main enclosure (Enclosure 2). It is in the alignment of the cut stones alignment disclosed in Enclosure 2 and thought to be related to Enclosure 2's gate. A very crude structure made of unprocessed limestone stones protrudes into Enclosure 3 from the southwestern corner of the surrounding wall of Enclosure 2. Its function is not clear but given its location it was probably related to the wall and the artificial slope.
Another stone pavement was identified in the southern part of the enclosure, made of 2 to 3 cm large coral fragments and shells mixed with earth, very strongly compacted. It is interpreted as a path leading to a building that has been identified through the presence of several postholes aligned with the pavement on its north side. A path made of small gravels has also been disclosed in Zakimi Gusuku, but it was spread on foundations made of large blocks of coral, which is not the case in Chatan. The aforementioned main gate of the gusuku, between Enclosure 3 and Enclosure 4, was located on the western side of this stone pavement.

==== Enclosure 4 ====
Enclosure 4 measures 9600 square metres (96 x 100 m). It is very large compared to the other enclosures and probably had a military function: troops and supplies could be gathered there in case of attack.

The fourth excavation survey (1987), held in order to determine if that very large area was also included in the gusuku, showed that the flat area had been created by levelling the land with stones, 20 cm large stones on the cliff side and 10 cm large stones on the hill side. It was then concluded that this area belonged to the gusuku, and it was named Enclosure 4. It made it clear that Chatan Gusuku was one of the largest gusukus of Okinawa Island. There is a difference of 10 metres between the western part and the eastern part of the enclosure: it is possible they corresponded in fact to two different enclosures. Chatan Gusuku would then have six enclosures. This need to be confirmed by excavations in the area, but the western part, called Iri Gusuku (lit. "the western gusuku") is a sacred place whose entrance is forbidden to men so that no archaeological survey was ever conducted there.
Collected artefacts include pottery, celadon and brown glaze stoneware (Nanman ware) dated of the 14th to 15th centuries, showing a probable contemporaneity with the building of Enclosure 2 and the upper occupation level of Enclosure 3.

The 1987 survey was held along the southern border of Enclosure 4, on the cliff slope. It disclosed a rubble masonry stone wall on the western side of the flat area, along the cliff. Later excavations have also disclosed 10 metres of the southern wall on the west of the main gate of the gusuku. This part of the wall is in ashlar masonry. In several other points on the southern side, only stacked limestone cobbles were observed.

The eighth excavation survey (1992), around the easternmost stone walls, disclosed two different walls: one 6 metres wide and the other 9 metres wide. The 6 metres wide stone wall is made of stones crudely cut, while the 9 metres wide stone wall is made of minutely cut ashlars. They both extend east-west for 25 metres, and their angles are rounded.

The main gate of the gusuku is located in the stone wall between Enclosure 3 and 4, on the south. Foundations thought to be the ones for the gate have been found in a flat area one step lower than the rest of Enclosure 3. The gate is about 2 metres wide and was closed by a wooden door. There are stairs on the slope on the eastern side of the gate in Enclosure 4, showing there was an access path coming from the east.

==== Enclosure 5 ====
Enclosure 5 measures 1500 square metres (75 x 20 metres). It is a terrace located north of Enclosure 4 and it was identified as a fifth enclosure during a reconnaissance survey in 2019.

It includes a very large limestone boulder fallen from the cliff, the top of which has been flattened by spreading coral gravels. There is an indentation on the cliff five metres above this boulder. It is thought that this corresponds to the location of the overhanging gate for the northern entrance.

Enclosure 5 is also the location of the tombs of Kaniman Aji and Yō Chōhō Sashiki Chikudun Kōdō.

==== Collected artefacts ====
The diverse archaeological surveys collected a total of 30970 artefacts, most of them from Enclosure 2 and Enclosure 3. Most of them were pottery sherds, followed in number by imported celadon sherds and imported brown glaze stoneware sherds.
The other types of artefacts include stoneware-like pottery, rooftile quality pottery, Chinese white porcelain, imported stoneware, Chinese blue-and-white porcelain, Jian ware, Kamuiyaki ware, iron implements, bronze implements and coins.

The pottery includes Fensa-kasō type of the Late Kaizuka period and cooking pot shapes of the Gusuku period.

The rooftile quality pottery sherds included some with flower impressions. Similar patterns have also been found in Urasoe Gusuku, Katsuren Gusuku and Nakijin Gusuku and are dated between the 14th and the 16th century.

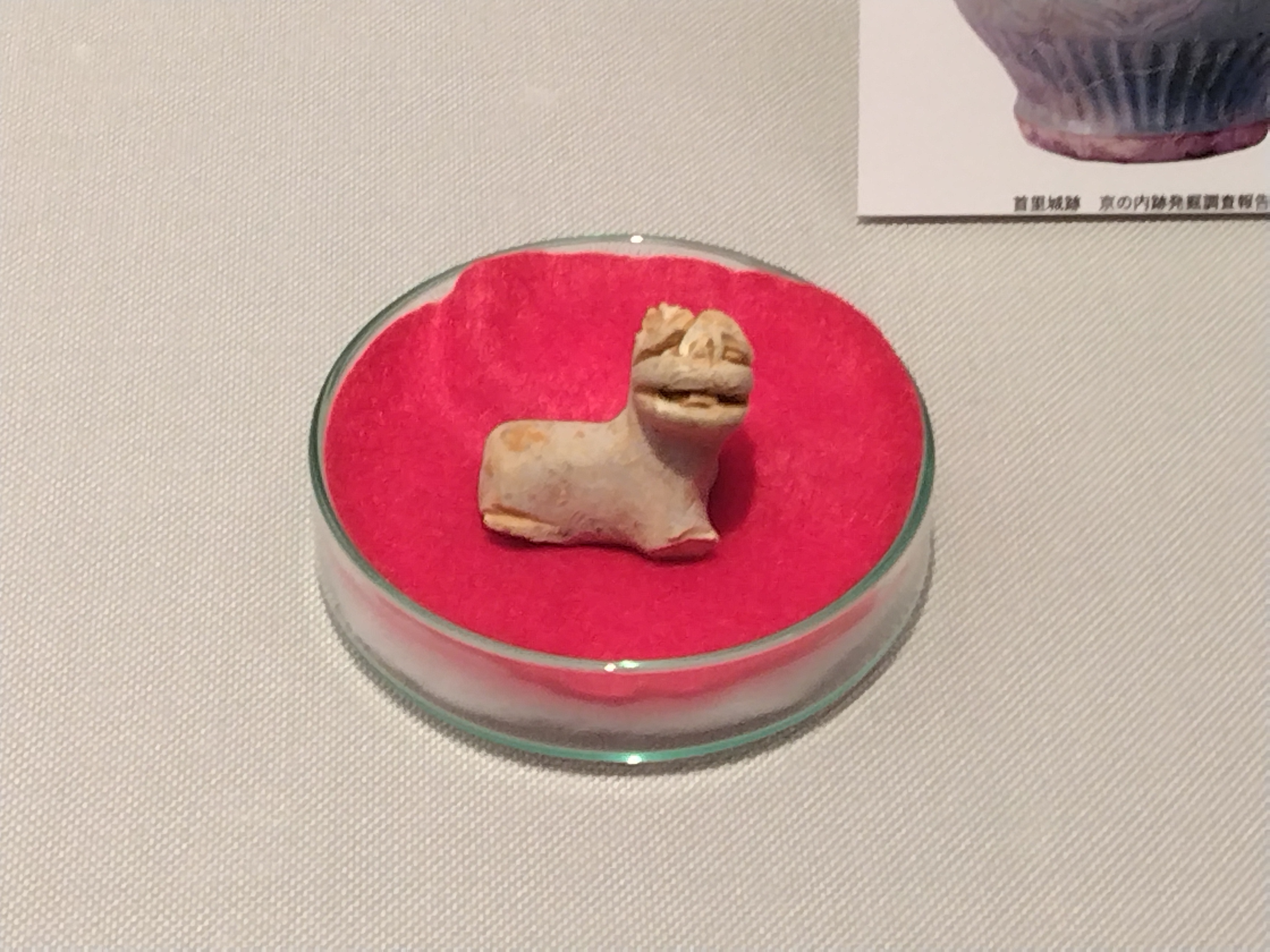
Lion-shaped celadon sherd from Chatan Gusuku

There were very few celadon sherds dated of the Southern Song Dynasty (12th-13th century): most of them were attributed to the 14th and 15th centuries, and none to the 16th.

The Chinese white porcelain sherds were exclusively from the 14th and 15th centuries.

Blue-and-white porcelain includes a few pieces of the end of the Yuan Dynasty / beginning of the Ming Dynasty from Enclosure 3. Such artefacts are quite rare in Okinawa and have been found in Shuri, Nakijin and Katsuren, showing the aji of Chatan Gusuku was probably very powerful.

Five Chinese coins were found in Enclosure 2, two of them complete, including one minted in 1189 and another in the latter half of the 14th century. Another coin minted between 1102 and 1106 during the Chongqing era was found in Enclosure 3.

Iron artefacts include nails, pins and projectile points.

The artefacts show that the hill was especially in use during the Late Kaizuka period and the Gusuku period. As previously mentioned the artefacts from the very beginning of the Gusuku period are very rare as well the ones postdating the 16th century.

=== Archaeological campaigns and research history ===
The archaeological surveys inside Chatan Gusuku are not always related to the gusuku itself, since the hill has been inhabited by human population as soon as the Early Kaizuka period.

==== Reconnaissance surveys ====
- Archaeological work started in April 1957 with the discovery of Chatan Gusuku Shellmound by members of the U.S. Forces who were installing a water tank. This site was briefly described in 1960 by Shinjun Tawada.
- In 1979, former members of the University of the Ryukyus Archaeological Club (Takashi Onga, Yoshikatsu Goya, Yoshiharu Yoneda, Seiken Teruya) implemented a field survey and identified seven sites on and around the Chatan Gusuku hill.
- In August 1982 Chatan Town Board of Education and the Chatan History Editorial Committee implemented a one-month long topographic survey to map the area and discovered four stone walls and three flat areas that determined enclosures.
- In October 1982, Mutsuhiro Kinjō and his team implemented a field survey of the slopes around the gusuku and were able to determine the complete scope of the gusuku. They also identified eighty-two tombs, old and new, including an Aji's tomb (Aji-baka) and the tomb of Yō Chōhō Sashiki Chikudun Kōdō, and the war period suicide boat facilities (Shirahi-gawa River Suicide Boat Secret Tunnel Complex).
- The same year, an environmental survey was also implemented by Okinawa Prefecture Board of Education, that identified fifty-one different vegetal species.
- In 1992 and 1993, during the general reconnaissance survey of all archaeological sites in Chatan, a total of twelve sites were confirmed inside Chatan Gusuku.

==== Excavation surveys ====
After the scope of the gusuku was disclosed with the topographic survey of 1982, nineteen archaeological surveys were held in Chatan Gusuku between 1984 and 2019.

- First Chatan Gusuku survey (1984), by Chatan Town Board of Education, including ten excavation locations in Enclosure 1 and 2, for a total of 40 square metres.
- Chatan Gusuku Site 7 Survey (1984), by Chatan Town Board of Education, excavation of 50 square metres in the former settlement of Rindō.
- Second Chatan Gusuku survey (1984), by Chatan Town Board of Education, excavation of 24 square metres at the original location of the Tun Sacred Site in Enclosure 3.
- Third Chatan Gusuku survey (1985), by Chatan Town Board of Education, excavation of 88 square metres in Enclosure 2 in search for the main buildings.
- Fourth Chatan Gusuku survey (1987), by Chatan Town Board of Education, test pits (for a total of 36 square metres) opened along the southern border of Enclosure 4 to determine the presence or absence of remains.
- Fifth Chatan Gusuku survey (1988), by Chatan Town Board of Education, excavation of 144 square metres in the southern part of Enclosure 2 (south of the residential building).
- Sixth Chatan Gusuku survey (1990), by Kumamoto University, excavation of 44 square metres in the supposed area of the gate between Enclosure 2 and Enclosure 3, topographic survey of Enclosure 2, with incursions in Enclosure 1 and 3.
- Seventh Chatan Gusuku survey (1991), by Kumamoto University, excavation of 68 square metres in Enclosure 3 in search for remains from the beginning of the Gusuku period (12th century) and topographic survey of the area between Enclosure 3 and 4.
- Eighth Chatan Gusuku survey (1992), by Chatan Town Board of Education, excavation of 450 square metres around the easternmost stone wall.
- Ninth Chatan Gusuku survey (1993), by Chatan Town Board of Education and Okinawa International University, excavation of five locations (37.5 square metres) in the depression located about 50 meters east of the wall of Chatan Gusuku, thought to be anthropic, and topographic survey of Enclosures 1 and 4.
- Stone walls distribution survey (1993), by Chatan Town Board of Education, in the whole extent of the hill.
- Tenth Chatan Gusuku survey (1994), by Chatan Town Board of Education and Okinawa International University, excavation of 26.5 square metres in the western part of Enclosure 3.
- Eleventh Chatan Gusuku survey (1995), by Chatan Town Board of Education and Okinawa International University, excavation of 200 square metres in the area of the gate between Enclosure 3 and Enclosure 4.
- Twelfth Chatan Gusuku survey (no data)
- Thirteenth to Sixteenth Chatan Gusuku survey (1998, 1999, 2002), by Chatan Town Board of Education, excavation of 400 square metres in the western corner of Rindō Settlement in order to find the path leading to the gusuku gate.
- Seventeenth Chatan Gusuku survey (2018-2019), by Chatan Town Board of Education, survey of 60,000 square metres in order to create a precise map of the gusuku.

== Related sites ==
=== Related surrounding sites ===
Pre-WWII maps show that several small hills once existed south of the gusuku, corresponding to the settlement of Rindō (Japanese: 伝道), the place called Mēgusuku (Japanese: 前グスク), the settlement of Tamēshi (Japanese: 玉代勢) and Chōrōyama (Japanese: 長老山). All those sites have yielded material of the Gusuku period and are considered as closely linked to Chatan Gusuku.

Located just 500 metres northwest of Chatan Gusuku, on a small hill on the other side of Shirahi-gawa River, Ichi Gusuku is considered an outpost of Chatan Gusuku. As Chatan Gusuku, Ichi Gusuku played a major part in the resistance to the Satsuma Invasion of 1609. Oral tradition sometimes makes it the storehouse of Chatan Gusuku rather than a simple military outpost.
The hill of Ichi Gusuku was 17 metres high with its highest point on the western side, and it was possible from the top to see as far as Cape Zanpa on the north and Cape Gusukuma on the south. The hill was covered in old Ryūkyū pines and included several other sacred sites such as a Bijuru shrine and the tomb of two generations of Ūkā Aji (Ōkawa Aji), that have been relocated.
The bridge that crossed Shirahi-gawa river between Chatan Gusuku and Ichi Gusuku was called Ichi Gusuku Bridge (Japanese: 池城橋). It was replaced by a five-arch stone bridge in 1821 and oral tradition says that most of the stones for its construction had been taken from Chatan Gusuku. Before WWII, the road at this point crossed the hill of Ichi Gusuku through the 18 metres long Chatan Tunnel that had been pierced in 1905. The tunnel was the first ever pierced in Okinawa Island, but it was destroyed by the Japanese Forces in 1944, probably causing damages to the gusuku.
Ichi Gusuku was completely destroyed during the construction of Military Road 1 / Government Highway 1 (currently National Road 58) after WWII. The eastern foot of the hill, suddenly cut, can still be seen along Shirahi-gawa River.

Also located on the other bank of Shirahi-gawa River are the two Gusuku period sites of Kumuibaru and Kushikanikubaru. Both the sites are dated of the beginning of the Gusuku period and include settlements and cemeteries. They have yielded a very large quantity of material of the beginning of the Gusuku period (talc pot fragments, Chinese white porcelain sherds and kamuiyaki ware sherds) and seems to have been centres more active even than Chatan Gusuku at this period.

=== Sites located inside Chatan Gusuku ===
==== Folk cultural properties inside Chatan Gusuku ====
The gusuku was associated with three dependent settlements located on the southern side of its hill: Chatan, Tamēshi and Rindō (the land where those settlements were is still in Camp Foster). Some of the sacred sites associated with those settlements and located inside Chatan Gusuku were still in use until the land was seized by the U.S. Forces. They include Agari-nu-utaki, Tun, Iri-nu-utaki, Gusuku hi-nu-kan, the Chatan Sū-gā spring, and the Kagan-gā spring sacred site.

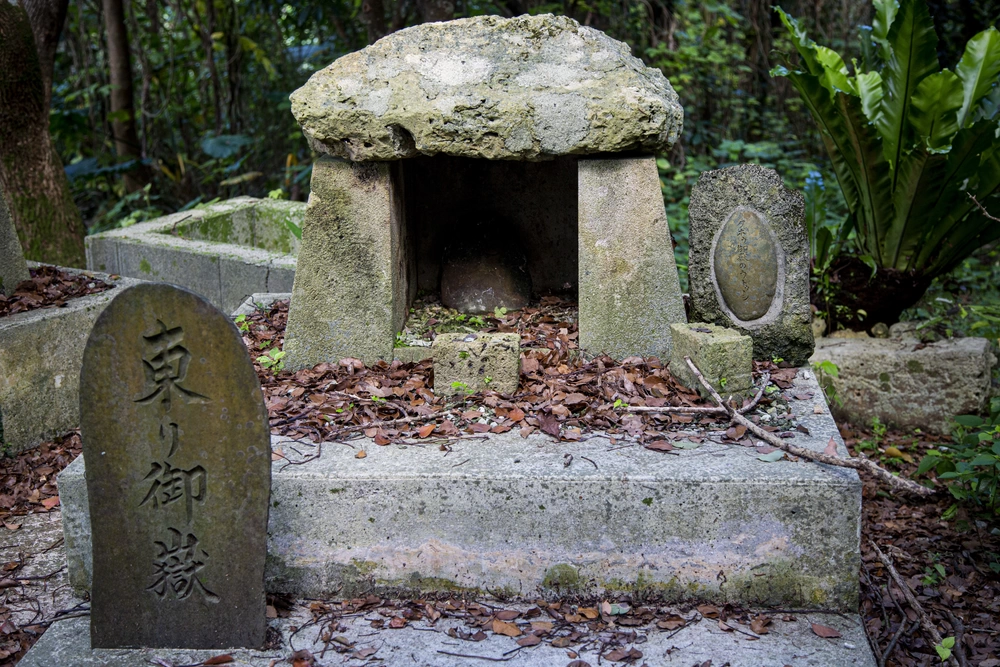
Chatan Gusuku Agari-nu-utaki

"Agari-nu-utaki Sacred Site (inside Chatan Gusuku)" (Japanese: 北谷城内「東ノ御嶽」) is designated under this name as a folk cultural property at the municipal level. Agari-nu-utaki is possibly the sacred site mentioned in the Ryūkyū-koku yurai-ki (1713) as "Yoshinoutaki", with the name of the god enshrined there being "Tengono-oibi". It is mentioned under the name of "Agari-nu-utaki" in the Ryūkyū-koku kyū-ki (1730).
It was located on the hill east of Chatan Gusuku, that is also named Agari Gusuku.
The Chatan Noro Dunchi household says that until WWII, Agari-nu-utaki was used as a utūshī (pray-from-afar altar) to address prayers to the "Yanbaru Kubō Utaki" (possibly the Kuba Utaki of Nakijin).
After WWII, the land was seized by the U.S. Forces and a pray-from-afar altar was set for Agari-nu-utaki in Chatan Chōrōyama Ritual Complex in 1960. In 1993, the inhabitants were given permission to rebuild their sacred sites inside Chatan Gusuku, even though it was still inside Camp Foster. However, Agari-nu-utaki could not be rebuilt at its original location: the site was reconstructed in the southern part of the third enclosure of Chatan Gusuku. The original location is marked with land survey poles to be transmitted to future generations.
Currently, prayers are being given at this site on the Umachī festivals of the 5th and 6th months of the lunar calendar by the Chatan Noro Dunchi household and representatives of the Friends of Aza Chatan Association. A sacred stone used as an utūshī for "Nakijin Kubō Utaki" is set just next to the current shrine.
It was designated as a "Municipal Folk Cultural Property" by Chatan Town in 2004.
The area of Chatan Gusuku was returned to Japan in 2020 but access is still strictly controlled by the Japanese Defense Bureau.

The "Tun Sacred Site (inside Chatan Gusuku)" (Japanese: 北谷城内「殿」) is designated under this name as a folk cultural property at the municipal level. It is located in Enclosure 3. "Tun" literally means "residence". Tun sacred sites are generally set at the location or supposed location of the residence of persons important to the settlement. Chatan Tun is probably the sacred site mentioned in the Ryūkyū-koku yurai-ki (1713) as "Chatan-gusuku-nai-nu-tun" (lit. "the tun inside Chatan Gusuku"), that is said to be a praying site for both Chatan and Tamēshi (currently Tamayose) Villages. It is also mentioned in the Ryūkyū-koku kyū-ki (1730) under the same name.
Prayers were given there for the rice-ears festival and the rice-harvest festival by Chatan Noro. There were also offerings by local administrators (jitū, ufuyaku) and the village people. Currently, prayers are being given at this site on the Umachī festivals of the 5th and 6th months of the lunar calendar by the Chatan Noro Dunchi household and representatives of the Friends of Aza Chatan Association.
After WWII, the land was seized by the U.S. Forces and a pray-from-afar altar was set for Chatan Tun in Chatan Chōrōyama Ritual Complex. In 1993, while still inside Camp Foster, the sacred site was reconstructed in the southwestern part of the third enclosure of Chatan Gusuku, about 15 m northeastward of its original location. It was designated as a Municipal Folk Cultural Property by Chatan Town in 2004.
The area of Chatan Gusuku was returned to Japan in 2020 but access is still strictly controlled by the Japanese Defense Bureau.

Iri-nu-utaki (Japanese: 西御嶽, lit. "the western sacred site") was rebuilt in December 1993 in Enclosure 4.
Sources are contradictory on its original location, in Enclosure 4 or Enclosure 3, although it is very likely it always was in Enclosure 4 in the area called Iri Gusuku. It probably corresponds to the sacred site mentioned in the Ryūkyū-koku yurai-ki and the Ryūkyū-koku kyū-ki under the name of "Gusuku-nai-amuro-zaki-nu-utaki", the name of the god enshrined there being "Ishiragono-o-ibe".
It currently counts thirteen incense burners and is called "the thirteen gods" or "the thirteen incense burners". The Chatan Noro Dunchi household says that the incense burners correspond to the twelve Earthly Branches, linked together by the fire god. Before WWII only Chatan Noro was allowed to enter the sacred site, except on the day preceding the Chatan Tug-of-War, a festival held every thirteen years by the three settlements of Chatan, Tamēshi and Rindō, when the inhabitants were allowed to come and pray for the festival to occur without accident. There is currently at the entrance of the utaki a stele engraved with "no man is allowed in this sacred area by the word of Chatan Noro".

The Gusuku Hi-nu-kan (fire god) is located in Enclosure 4, in the area called Iri Gusuku, before Iri-nu-utaki. Prayers were given there before entering the sacred area of Iri-nu-utaki.

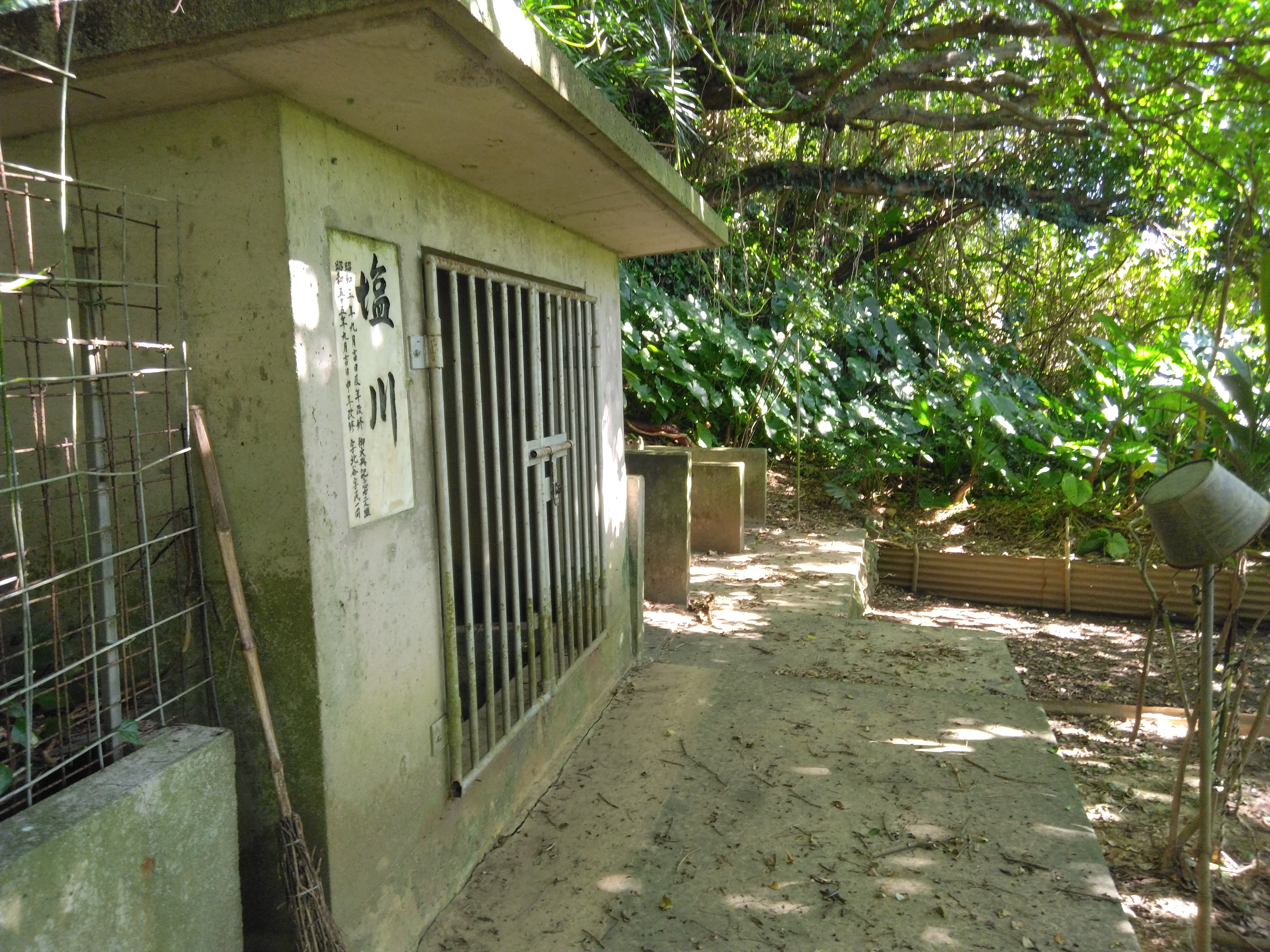
Chatan Gusuku Sū-gā Well

Chatan Sū-gā well (Japanese: 北谷塩川) is located on the western border of Chatan Gusuku hill. The well is currently enclosed in a concrete shrine. It is also called "Gusuku-gusainī-gā".
It was used until WWII by the people of the settlement of Chatan, for their everyday use and for the sacred wakamiji of the New Year. Prayers are given at the well on the Hachiubī (first prayers) of the 3rd day of the 1st month of the lunar calendar and on the Kāubī (spring prayers) of the 11th day of the 8th month, by the Chatan Noro Dunchi household.
The incense burner for Sū-gā is located inside the concrete shrine, behind the well. There are two other incense burners on the right side of the well, each with a stone stele, one for "Aji-baka-nu-utushi" (pray-from-afar altar for the Aji's tomb) and one for "Uganju : Mifūda" (sacred site of Mifūda). The other surrounding wells linked to the gusuku, Inagu-gā in Rindō that was used by the female attendants of the gusuku for bathing and laundry, and Nūru-gā that was used by Chatan Noro to purify herself before she entered the gusuku, have disappeared in the postwar landscape modifications.

An incense burner for the Kagan-gā spring (Japanese: カガンガー) is located in Enclosure 3, by the Tun and the new Agari-nu-utaki. It is accompanied by a stone stele mentioning that it is related to Agari-nu-utaki and was erected in 2005. Kagan-gā is the name of a well that used to be located by the original Agari-nu-utaki at the foot of the Agari Gusuku hill.

==== Archaeological sites inside Chatan Gusuku ====
The early reconnaissance surveys of Chatan Gusuku disclosed a group of eleven sites of different periods located on the hill, that were given numbers:

- No.1 Kaniman Aji's Tomb, (Japanese: 金満按司墓, romanized: Kaniman Ufaka) identified in 1982, located on the northern slope, in Enclosure 5, in a natural cave opening on the cliff. It was emptied after WWII and is not currently in use. The lower part of the very large cave entrance, 3 metres wide and 5 metres high, is closed by ashlar masonry. The funerary chamber inside is 8 by 6 metres large and 6 metres high. The path to the grave (haka-michi) is located on the right side of the tomb and includes stone steps. It used to start from the top of the hill inside the gusuku and was in use for ceremonies held at the tomb until WWII. Several munchus from the surrounding villages used to pray there for the Shīmī Festival. After the war they climbed the hill from the bottom. The tomb was relocated in 1960 outside of the military base.
- No.2 Yō Shiho Sashiki Chikudun Kōdō's Tomb (Japanese: 雍肇豊佐敷筑登之興道の墓) identified in 1982, located about 10 metres westward of Kaniman's tomb, is also made out of a natural cave opening in the cliff. The opening is closed by rubble masonry (nozura-tsumi). There is a small open space in front that serves as tomb courtyard (nā), in which there used to be a stone stele (only the foundations remain). Since it is known by historical documents that Kōdō's tomb had a stone stele, it is thought this tomb is his.
- No. 3 Chatan Mōshi's Tomb, located about 10 metres westward of Yō Shiho Sashiki Chikudun Kōdō's tomb, has been very damaged by landslides. Chatan Mōshi, whose life has been dramatised in the play of the same name, was a celebrated singer who inadvertently gave a poem destined to her lover Kakuri Umisatu to the wrong man, Makabi Satunushi. Since Makabi Satunushi was in love with her as well, he visited her at night and the whole household ended up in confusion. Although Mōshi preserved her virtue, her lover Kakuri Umisatu heard about the love letter and, thinking it was addressed to Makabi Satunushi, tried to take his own life out of sorrow. He threw himself from a cliff but did not die and after a while was introduced to another woman, Chirā, whom he decided to marry. However, he was reunited with Mōshi and realised he still loved her. Jealous, Chirā decided to kill Mōshi but was talked out of her project by Mōshi's nursing-mother.
- No.4, two unnamed tombs on the cliff to Shirahi-gawa River, identified in 1982. The tombs are in two natural caves that are next to each other. The opening is 2.5 metres wide, 1.3 metre high, and the caves are 1.8 metre deep. There are four circular holes, about 15 centimetres in diameter, dug at the opening, on the ground and the ceiling, to set wooden beams to close the tomb. This type of closing is rare, it can also be seen in the cliff tombs of Unten Harbour in Nakijin.
- No.5, a Fensa-kasō type pottery (Late Kaizuka period) scatter located at the foot of the cliff of the northwestern corner of Chatan Gusuku, was identified during the 1979 survey by the former members of the University of the Ryukyus Archaeological Club.
- No.6, an artefact scatter with Kaizuka period pottery and Early Modern period stoneware in relation with Sū-gā Spring, is located at the southwestern corner of Chatan Gusuku.
- No.7, (excavated as "Chatan Gusuku Site No. 7") corresponds to the former settlement of Rindō on the southern side of Chatan Gusuku, including the Noro's well Nūrū-gā. It yielded Early Modern stoneware, porcelain and celadon.
- No.8, an artefact scatter located below the southern cliff of the first, second and third enclosures of the gusuku, yielded pottery of the Late Kaizuka and Gusuku periods, as well as a large quantity of celadon.
- No.9, an artefact scatter with pottery of the Early Kaizuka period Phase III, was located on the northeastern side of the gusuku. However, the excavation survey held in 1993 at this location confirmed its destruction.
- No.10, an artefact scatter with Late Kaizuka period pottery and marine shells, is located on the southeastern side of the gusuku, on the slope. It is possible it is in fact part of Chatan Gusuku Shell Mound.
- No.11 Chatan Gusuku Shell Mound, located on the eastern side of the gusuku, is the first archaeological site to have been identified in Chatan Gusuku, published in 1960.

More recent reconnaissance surveys have identified eighty-two tombs in the whole hill and at least five tunnels dug on the northern cliff by the Japanese Forces during WWII.

== See also ==
- List of Historic Sites of Japan (Okinawa)
