= Gushikawa (disambiguation) =

Gushikawa, Okinawa is a city in Japan.

Gushikawa may also refer to:

- Gushikawa Chōei, a member of the royal family of the Ryukyu Kingdom
- Gushikawa, Okinawa (village)
- Gushikawa Castle (disambiguation), two castles
