= Uezu =

Uezu may refer to:

== People ==
- Makoto Uezu, Japanese anime screenwriter

== Other uses ==
- Uezu House, home in Japan
