= Gushikawa Castle =

Gushikawa Castle may refer to:

- Gushikawa Castle (Kume)
- Gushikawa Castle (Itoman)
