= UEO =

UEO may refer to:

- Katsuhiro Ueo (born 1972), Japanese professional drifting driver
- Kumejima Airport (IATA: UEO), Okinawa, Japan
- United Earth Oceans Organization, an organization in the television series SeaQuest DSV
- the abbreviation for Union de l'Europe Occidentale on the flag of the Western European Union
