= Gushikawa Castle (Kume) =

Ryukyuan gusuku on Kume Island in Kumejima, Okinawa

- 具志川城跡
- Nakandakari, Kumejima, Shimajiri District, Okinawa 901-3135, Japan

Site information
- Type: Gusuku
- Open to the public: yes
- Condition: Ruins

Location
- Gushikawa Castle Gushikawa Castle (Japan)
- Coordinates: 26°23′00″N 126°45′04″E

Site history
- Built: 15th century
- Materials: Ryukyuan limestone, wood
- National Historic Site of Japan

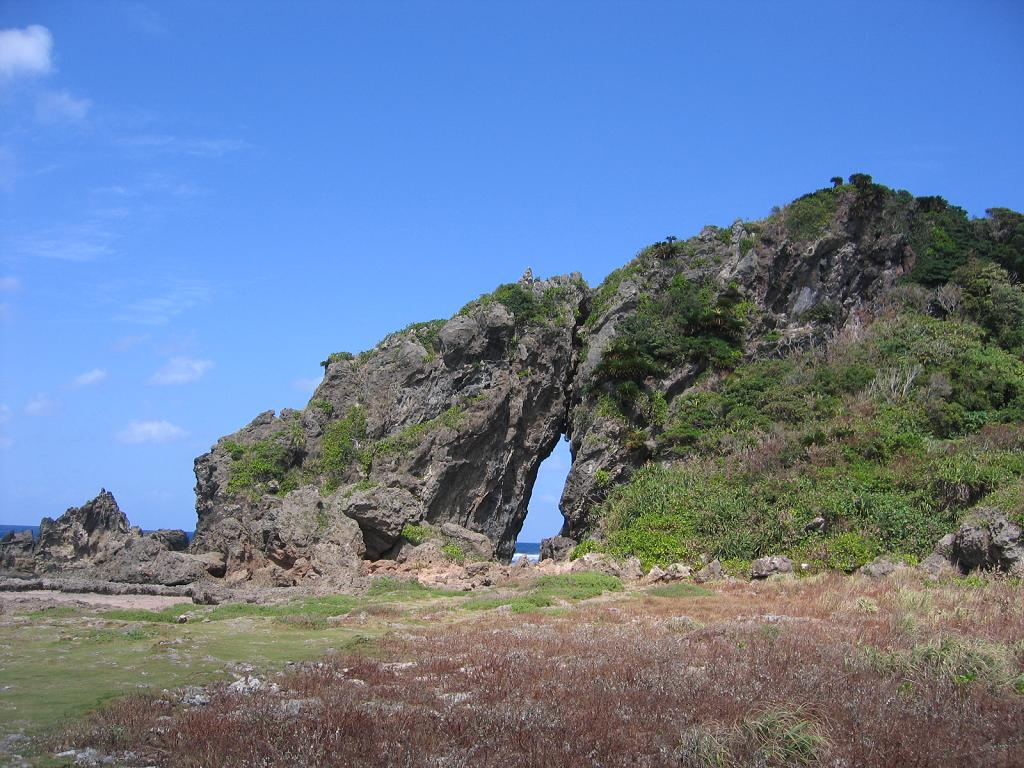
Miifugaa rock formation near Gushikawa Castle

Gushikawa Castle (具志川城, Gushikawa jō; Okinawan: Gushichaa Gushiku) is a Ryūkyūan gusuku fortification in the Nakamura-do neighborhood of the town of Kumejima, Okinawa, on Kume Island. It has been protected by the central government as a National Historic Site since 1975.

== Overview ==
Gushikawa Castle is located in the northwest of Kumejima, on a hill jutting out into the East China Sea, surrounded by cliffs on the east, west, and north sides, and connected to the island to the south. The castle consists of four enclosures, surrounded by rock walls only a meter in height. The northernmost enclosure, (Enclosure I), is the highest within the castle and is thought to have served as a watchtower. The southwestern enclosure, (Enclosure II), has a south-facing platform and sandstone foundation stones, suggesting it housed the main building and its forecourt. The entry to the fortification was a gate in Enclosure III, located in the southwest. Enclosure IV was to the northwest of Enclosure III. It is uncertain when this fortification as constructed, but during archaeological excavations conducted from 1999 to 2007, ceramics dating to the 14th and 15th centuries have been excavated, suggesting that the original castle form was completed by the early 15th century. The Ryūkyū-koku yurai-ki, the official chronicles of the Ryūkyū Kingdom (published in 1713) and records of Kumijima from 1743 state that the castle was built by Madafutsu Anj on the site of a nearby village's sacred site. Later, during the reign of Madafutsu Anj's son, Makanegoe Anj, the castle was attacked and defeated by Manikudaru Anj, the second son of Ishikinaha Chinaha Anj, also on Kumejima, and Manikudaru Anj became the castle's lord. Makanegoe Anj fled to the southern part of Okinawa Island and built a castle there, which he also named "Gushikawa Castle" in Itoman, Okinawa. Gushikawa Castle on Kumejima was later destroyed by an army sent by King Shō Shin in the early 16th century.

The Miifugaa rock formation can be seen from the castle.

== See also ==
- List of Historic Sites of Japan (Okinawa)
