= Ryūkyū-koku kyū-ki =

Chorography of the Ryūkyū Kingdom

The Ryūkyū-koku kyū-ki (Japanese: 琉球國舊記 or 琉球国旧記, lit. 'Ancient chronicles of the Ryūkyū kingdom') is a chorography compiled by Tei Heitetsu Kohagura Uēkata Yūjitsu (Japanese: 鄭秉哲 古波蔵親方祐實) for the government of the Ryūkyū Kingdom. It describes notable and sacred places of the kingdom, its administrative organisation and its official ceremonies. It was presented to king Shō Kei during Year 9 of the Yongzheng Era (1731).

The Ryūkyū-koku kyū-ki corrects and completes the information from the Ryūkyū-koku yurai-ki (1713) and uses as well other original sources. It is entirely written in traditional Chinese characters and counts twenty volumes: nine main volumes and eleven appendix volumes.

Although it includes many original elements, the Ryūkyū-koku kyū-ki is often considered as a simple transcription in Chinese ideograms of the Ryūkyū-koku yurai-ki and is far less studied than its predecessor.

== Edition ==
After about twenty years, the government of the Ryūkyū Kingdom deems necessary to publish a new opus covering the same themes as the Ryūkyū-koku yurai-ki, but this time entirely written in Chinese ideograms, without the use of Japanese characters. The Ryūkyū-koku kyū-ki makes more use of ancient legends and stories, a tendency that will be observable as well later in the Kyūyō, that includes four appendix volumes entirely dedicated to those traditional legends (Irōsetsuden).

=== Order ===
The preface of the Ryūkyū-koku kyū-ki mentions that the Ryūkyū-koku yurai-ki being rather incomplete and including many errors, the king gave the order of its revision, insisting on the fact the articles should be completed and all information verified to be true, and that this new book should be named “kyū-ki” (ancient chronicles).

The genealogic records of the Tei Clan indicate that Tei Heitetsu received the order to compile the Ryūkyū-koku-kyū-ki in Year 8 of the Yongzheng Era (1730).

=== Sources ===
The Ryūkyū-koku kyū-ki is not just a simple translation in Chinese ideograms of the Ryūkyū-koku yurai-ki: compared to the ones in the Ryūkyū-koku yurai-ki, the descriptions in the Ryūkyū-koku kyū-ki are more objective. It also includes many paragraphs that simply do not exist in the Ryūkyū-koku yurai-ki, about the springs and wells, the bays and harbours or the guards houses.

The Ryūkyū-koku kyū-ki also includes information found in the Kojishū (Okinawan: 古事集), another book in thirteen volumes from the Ryūkyū Kingdom. Its precise edition date is not known, but it seems it was published between the Ryūkyū-koku yurai-ki and the Ryūkyū-koku kyū-ki.

Previously unpublished information found in the Ryūkyū-koku kyū-ki were probably obtained thanks to a 1725 ordinance that is mentioned as a memorandum in the Tokashiki Magiri yurai-ki (Japanese: 渡嘉敷間切由来記, lit. 'Chronicles of the origins of Tokashiki Magiri'). This ordinance asks each magiri to gather informations concerning its old castles, rites, springs, rivers, administrators and famous people.

=== Editorial choices ===
==== Chinese characters ====
The Ryūkyū-koku kyū-ki is entirely written in traditional Chinese characters. It gives the transcription in Chinese characters of the Okinawan names of the utakis and other mentioned sacred places, which was not the case in the Ryūkyū-koku yurai-ki and makes it a reference book for vocabulary and pronunciation studies as well.

The discontinuation in the use of Japanese characters in documents by the government of the Ryūkyū Kingdom is a general tendency that starts as soon as the end of the 17th century with the redaction of the Rekidai Hōan in 1697 and goes on during the whole 18th century with the Chūzan Seifu of Sai Taku (1701), the Kume-jima Nakazato magiri kyū-ki (Okinawan: 久米島仲里間切旧記, lit. 'Ancient chronicles of Nakazato Magiri on Kume Island') (1703), the Yaeyama taki-daki yurai-ki (Okinawan: 八重山嶽々由来記, lit. 'Chronicles of the origins of the sacred places in Yaeyama') (1705), the Kimihae yurai narabini ikai katsu kuji (Okinawan: 君南風由来并位階且公事, lit. 'Origins of Kimihae, noble ranks and official matters') (1705), the Ryūkyū-koku Chūzan ōfu kansei (Okinawan: 琉球国中山王府官制, lit. 'Organisation of the public servants of the royal government of Chūzan of the Ryūkyū Kingdom') (1706), the Nyokan osōshi (Okinawan: 女官御双紙, lit. 'Double documents concerning female public servants') (1706), the Miyako-jima kyū-ki (Okinawan: 宮古島旧記, lit. 'Ancient chronicles of Miyako Island') (1707), the Naha yurai-ki (Okinawan: 那覇由来記, lit. 'Chronicles of the origins of Naha') (1709), the Konkōkenshū (Okinawan: 混効験集, lit. 'Official Ryūkyūan Dictionary') (1711), the Chūzan Seifu of Sai On (1725), the Kyūyō (1745) or the Irōsetsuden (1745).

==== Chapters organisation ====
While the Ryūkyū-koku yurai-ki organises its chapters geographically, the Ryūkyū-koku kyū-ki organises them thematically (tun, nīyā, kami-ashiage, utaki, mui, ibi, springs, harbours…).

Each paragraph starts by mentioning the date of the described facts, which is probably an influence of Sai On’s Chūzan Seifu (1725).

==== Selection of the information to be published ====
The preface of the Ryūkyū-koku kyū-ki mentions that the Ryūkyū-koku yurai-ki includes “the relation of many facts in relation with China or Yamato (Japan), including some that are redundant, and others that are not worth being mentioned into a book”. Indeed, the Ryūkyū-koku yurai-ki describes the origins of many rites in China and Japan. The editors of the Ryūkyū-koku kyū-ki mention that they do not wish to repeat those facts. The Ryūkyū-koku kyū-ki was written at a time when the Ryūkyū Kingdom has finally got over its invasion by the Satsuma Domain, has put order into its domination by the Shimazu clan and is claiming once again its status of independent kingdom. This is the reason why it wants to confirm its own history and origins by the redaction of several books (official histories and chorographies), in order to affirm its personality, its ryūkyūanity. It is then, when compared with the Ryūkyū-koku yurai-ki, a book that permits to understand what the government at the time considered as ryūkyūanity.

=== Editors ===
The preface mentions a large number of contributors, but it is generally admitted that the book has mainly been written by Tei Heitetsu Ufumine Satonushi Pēchin Yūjitsu (Japanese: 鄭秉哲 大嶺里之子親雲上祐實) (who will later become Kohagura Uēkata).

Sessei

- Shō Tetsu Chatan Wōji Chōki (Okinawan: 尚徹 北谷王子朝騎), brother of king Shō Kei

Sanshikan

- Shō Wasei Nishihira Uēkata Chōjo (Okinawan: 向和聲/向和声 西平親方朝敘/ 朝叙)
- Mō Heijin Misato Uēkata Anman (Okinawan: 毛秉仁 美里親方安滿)
- Sai On Gushichan Uēkata Bunjaku (Okinawan: 蔡温 具志頭親方文若)

Main secretaries (Okinawan: 總宗司司正)

- Shō Kan Onna Wōji Chōchoku (Okinawan: 尚監 恩納王子朝直), brother of king Shō Eki, will later become Noguni Wōji.
- Shō Sejaku Nakazato Aji Chōryū (Okinawan: 向世爵 仲里按司朝隆)
- Shō Inshun Yagi Uēkata Chōkyō (Okinawan: 向允濬 屋宜親方朝喬)

Specialists (Okinawan: 經歷)

- Shō Kikan Matsuyama Satonushi Pēchin Chōryō (Okinawan: 向其寛 松山里之子親雲上朝良)
- Shō Eisei Genga Pēchin Chōgi (Okinawan: 向永成 源河親雲上朝義)
- Shō Shōretsu Machinato Satonushi Pēchin Chōkei (Okinawan: 向承烈 牧港里之子親雲上朝経)

Éditeur (Okinawan: 纂修司)

- Tei Heitetsu Ufumine Satonushi Pēchin Shunkyō (Okinawan: 鄭秉哲 大嶺里之子親雲上濬橋), will later become Tei Heitetsu Kohagura Uēkata Yūjitsu.

== Contents ==
The Ryūkyū-koku kyū-ki includes twenty volumes: nine main volumes (and a preface) and eleven appendix volumes (and a postface).

The Ryūkyū-koku kyū-ki describes in great detail the notable and sacred places of Shuri, Tomari, Naha and Tōei (Kuninda) and of the other parts of the kingdom, including the ones that have already disappeared at the time of redaction of the book. It lists the utakis, uganjus, hi-nu-kan, temples, shrines, springs, rivers and harbours. It gives details on the administrative organisation of the kingdom, the official ceremonies and rites. It also transcribes the dedicatory inscriptions of the bronze bells.

Far more detailed than the Ryūkyū-koku yurai-ki, it is a fundamental text for Ryūkyūan studies.

=== Conserved volumes ===
The Ryūkyū-koku kyū-ki includes twenty volumes:

Main volumes

- Preface (Okinawan: 予)
- Vol. 1 – Chronicles of Shuri, chronicles of Tomari Village, chronicles of Naha, chronicles of Tōei (Kuninda) (Okinawan: 首里記、泊邑記、那覇記、唐栄記)
- Vol. 2 – Administrative positions, discontinued positions, privileges (Okinawan: 官職部、廃官、知行)
- Vol. 3 – Public matters (list of yearly ceremonies in Shuri Castle) (Okinawan: 公事)
- Vol. 4 – Chronicles of the beginning of the ritual year (Okinawan: 事始記)
- Vol. 5 – Old castles, gates and bridges (Okinawan: 古城、関梁)
- Vol. 6 – Notable places in Shimajiri, Nakagami, Kunigami (Okinawan: 島尻、中頭、国頭)
- Vol. 7 – Temples and shrines (Okinawan: 寺社)
- Vol. 8 – Utakis and sacred places of Kume Island, Yōhekizan (Izena), Bashizan (Kerama) (Okinawan: 久米嶋記、葉壁山、馬歯山)
- Vol. 9 – Utakis and sacred places of Miyakoyama, Yaeyama (Okinawan: 宮古山、八重山)

Appendix volumes

- Annexes Vol. 1 – Tun (Okinawan: 神殿)
- Annexes Vol. 2 – Nīya and kami-ashiage (Okinawan: 根屋・神軒)
- Annexes Vol. 3 – Utaki, mui, ibi (Okinawan: 嶽・森・威部)
- Annexes Vol. 4 – Springs and wells (Okinawan: 泉井)
- Annexes Vol. 5 – Bays and harbours (Okinawan: 江港)
- Annexes Vol. 6 – Administrative positions (Okinawan: 官職)
- Annexes Vol. 7 – Nobility titles (Okinawan: 官爵)
- Annexes Vol. 8 – Hi-nu-kan (Okinawan: 火神)
- Annexes Vol. 9 – Dedicatory inscriptions on bells (Okinawan: 鐘銘)
- Annexes Vol. 10 – Districts and villages, administrators of districts and villages, stations (guards’ houses) (Okinawan: 郡邑・郡邑長・驛)
- Annexes Vol. 11 – Customs (Okinawan: 風俗)
- Postface (Okinawan: 跋)

== Recent editions ==
The text of the Ryūkyū-koku kyū-ki was published in the third volume of the Collection of historical documents from Ryūkyū (Japanese: 琉球史料叢書).

A version translated in Japanese was published by Yōjushorin Editions in 2005.

The text is available on Wikisource and on the website of Meiji University

== Posterity ==
The Ryūkyū-koku kyū-ki is one of the primary sources used for the redaction of the Kyūyō in 1743. Three hundred and seventy of its articles, especially the ones concerning legends and traditional stories are used (and completed) in the Kyūyō and the Irōsetsuden.
