= Uegusuku Castle (Kume) =

- 宇江城城
- Kumejima, Okinawa
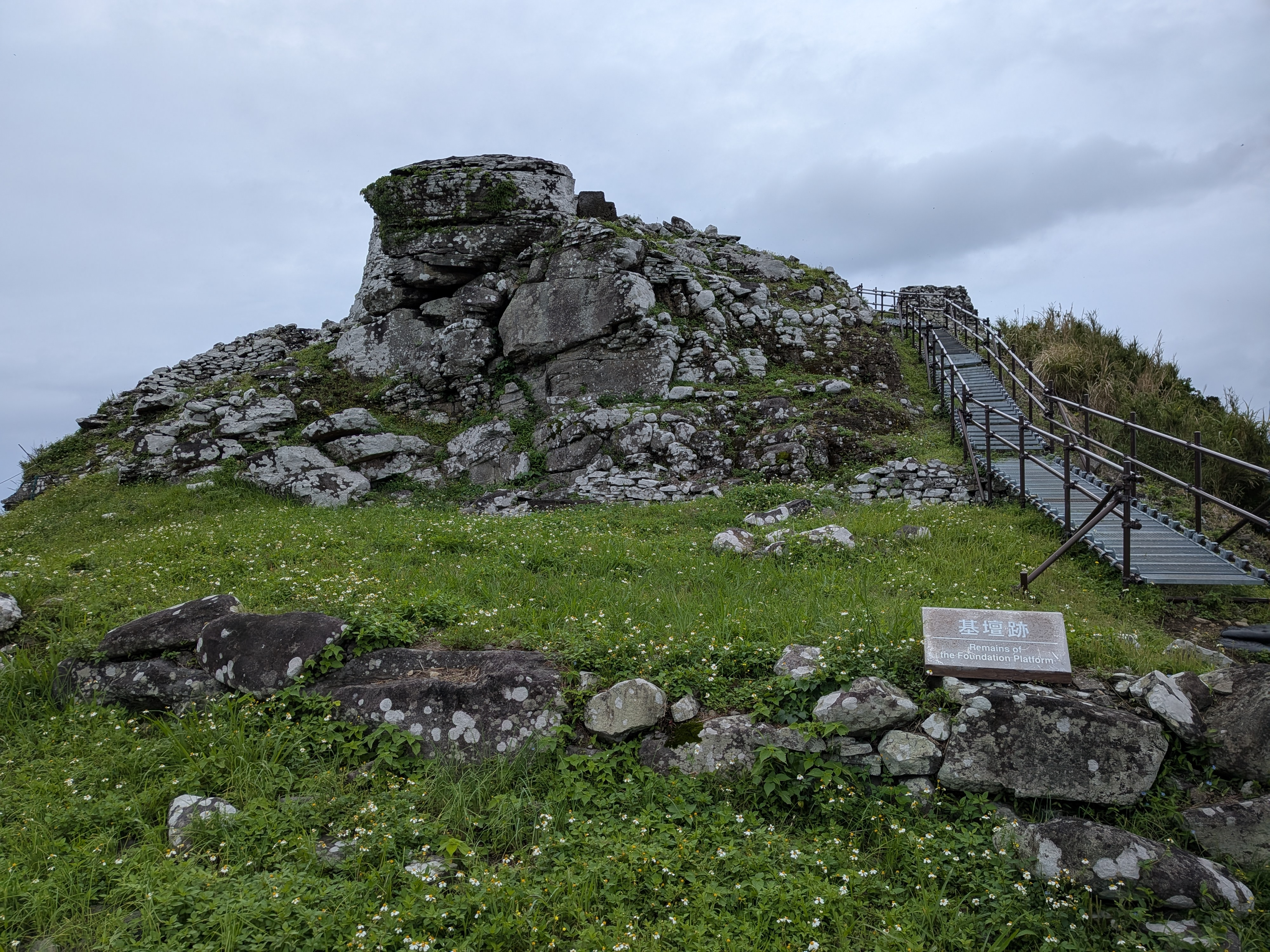

Site information
- Type: Gusuku
- Open to the public: yes
- Condition: Ruins

Location
- Uegusuku Castle Uegusuku Castle (Japan)
- Coordinates: 26°22′35″N 126°46′0.9″E

Site history
- Built: 15th century

Garrison information
- Occupants: Aji of Kume
- National Historic Site of Japan

Uegusuku Castle (宇江城城, Uegusuku jō; Okinawan: Wiigushiku) is a Ryūkyūan gusuku fortification located in the town of Kumejima, Okinawa, on Kume Island, Japan. Its ruins have been protected by the central government as a National Historic Site since 2009.

== Overview ==
Uegusuku Castle was built on the summit of Mount Uegusuku, approximately 310 meters above sea level on the island of Kumejima. Of the gusuku castles scattered throughout Okinawa, this castle was built at the highest elevation and is believed to have been constructed around the late 14th century to the mid-15th century, before the unification of the Ryukyu Kingdom. Its walls were made from slab-shaped andesite stones mined nearby. Archaeological excavations have unearthed many pieces of Chinese ceramics, suggesting that trade with China existed even before the unification of the Ryūkyū Kingdom. These include more than 40 tenmoku tea bowls, taikai tea caddies, and tea mortars, suggesting that matcha (powdered green tea) was consumed within the castle grounds. While gusuku were primarily fortifications, their gardens also served as ceremonial gathering places for people. After World War II, much of the castle walls were destroyed, but the walls to the north and east of the first bailey were spared.

Uegusuku Castle was the home to the Aji of Kume Magiri before the 16th century. It is now a ruined castle.

== See also ==
- List of Historic Sites of Japan (Okinawa)
