= Uezu House =

- 上江洲家住宅
- Interactive map of the Uezu House area

General information
- Architectural style: Traditional Ryūkyūan
- Location: Kumejima, Okinawa, 816 Nishime, Kumejima Town, Okinawa Prefecture, Japan
- Completed: 1750

Uezu House (上江洲家住宅) is a traditional Ryūkyūan home in Kumejima, Okinawa, Japan. It was the personal home of the Aji of Kume Island, built around 1750. There is a ¥300 entry fee.
