= Kumejima Prefectural Natural Park =

Park in Okinawa, Japan

- 久米島県立自然公園
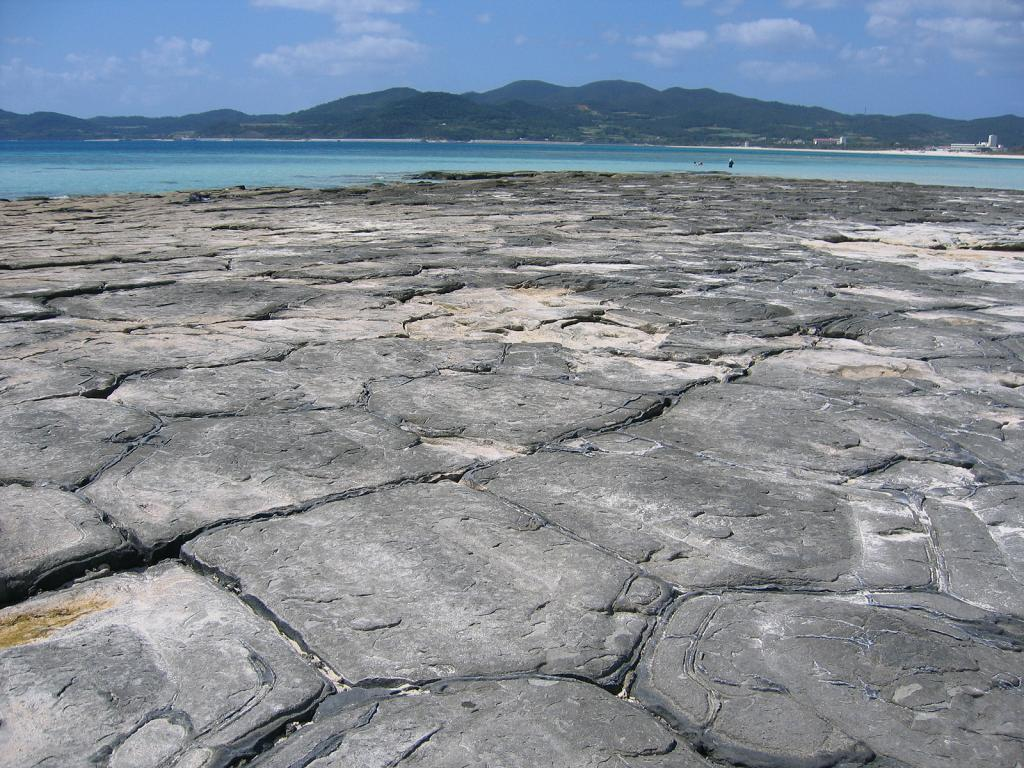
- Tatami ishi
- Interactive map of Kumejima Prefectural Natural Park
- Location: Okinawa Prefecture, Japan
- Area: 118.68 km^{2} (45.82 sq mi)
- Established: 30 May 1983

Kumejima Prefectural Natural Park (久米島県立自然公園, Kumejima kenritsu shizen kōen) is a Prefectural Natural Park in the islands of Kumejima, Okinawa Prefecture, Japan. It was established in 1983 and includes a designated marine zone of 57 km^{2}.

== See also ==
- National Parks of Japan
- Iriomote-Ishigaki National Park
- Okinawa Kaigan Quasi-National Park
