= Kumejima Airport =

Kumejima Airport Kume Jima Airport
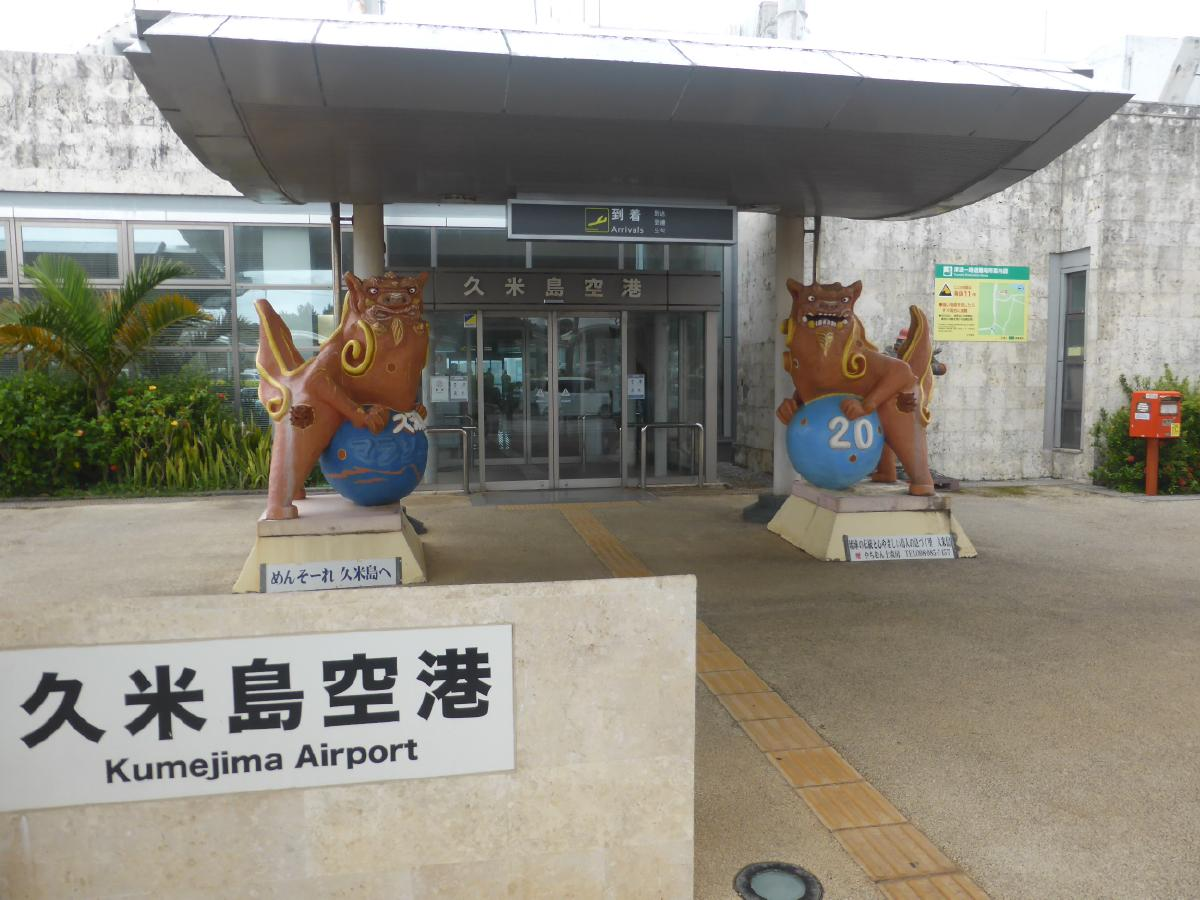
- IATA: UEO; ICAO: ROKJ

Summary
- Airport type: Public
- Operator: Okinawa Prefecture
- Location: Kumejima, Okinawa, Japan
- Elevation AMSL: 23 ft (7.0 m)
- Coordinates: 26°21′49″N 126°42′50″E

Map
- Location in Japan ROKJ (Japan)

Runways
Direction	Length		Surface
Direction	m	ft	Surface
03/21	2,000	6,562	Asphalt concrete

Statistics (2015)
- Passengers: 238,875
- Cargo (metric tonnes): 1,359
- Aircraft movement: 5,487
- Source: Japanese Ministry of Land, Infrastructure, Transport and Tourism

Kumejima Airport (久米島空港, Kumejima Kūkō) (IATA: UEO, ICAO: ROKJ) is an airport in Kumejima, a city and island in the Okinawa Prefecture of Japan.

The prefecture operates the airport, which is classified as a third class airport.

== Airlines and destinations ==
Airlines	Destinations
Japan Airlines	Seasonal: Tokyo–Haneda
Japan Transocean Air	Naha
Ryukyu Air Commuter	Naha
