= Gushikawa Castle (Itoman) =

Castle in Itoman, Okinawa, Japan

Gushikawa Castle 具志川城
- Itoman, Okinawa
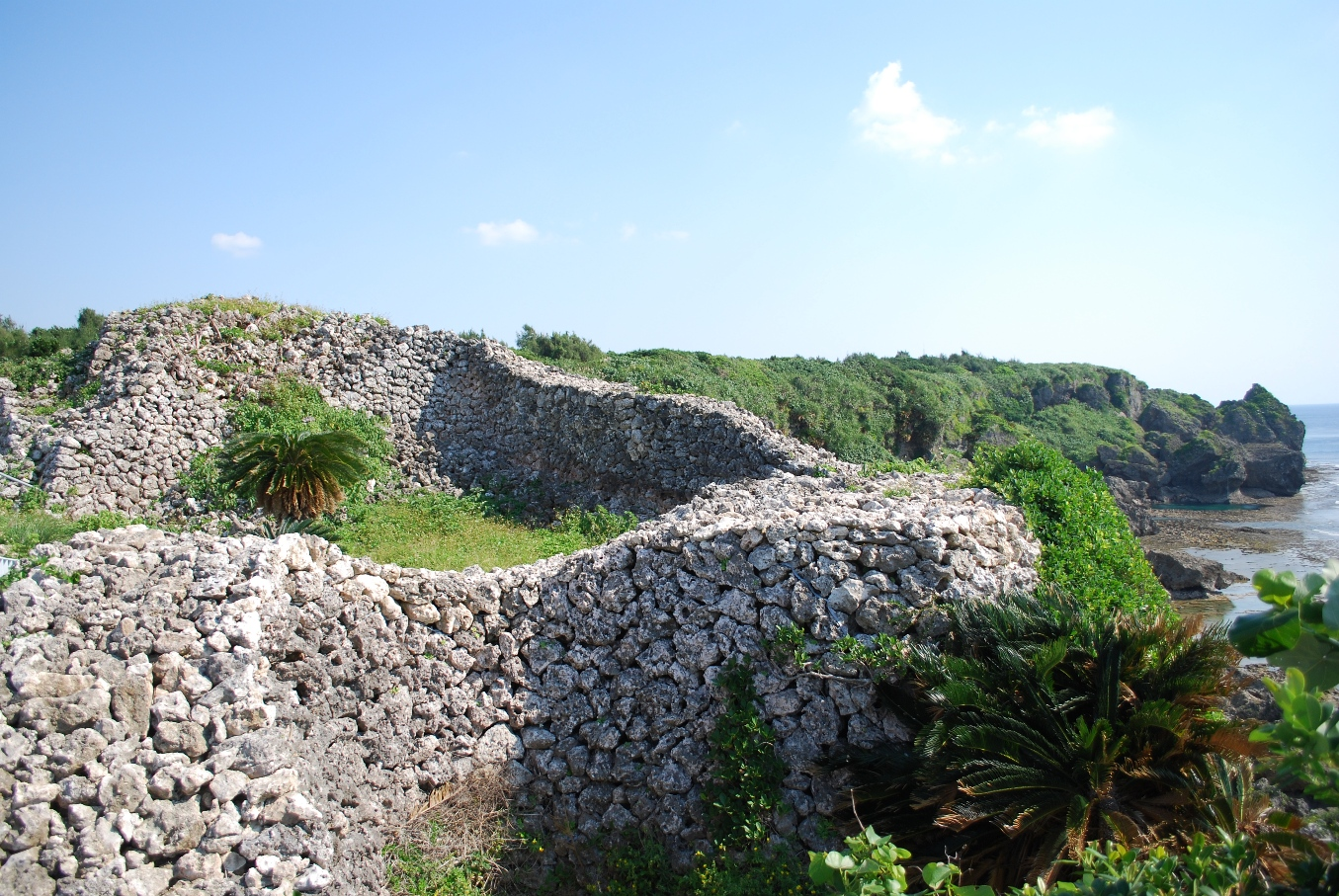
- Gushikawa Castle

Site information
- Type: Gusuku
- Open to the public: yes
- Condition: Ruins

Location
- Coordinates: 26°04′49″N 127°39′52″E

Site history
- Built: late 12th century
- Materials: Ryūkyūan limestone, wood

Gushikawa Castle (具志川城, Gushikawa jō; Okinawan: Gushichan Gushiku) is a Ryukyuan gusuku fortification in the city of Itoman, Okinawa, Japan. The castle ruins were designated a National Historic Site on May 15, 1972.

== Overview ==
The Gushikawa Castle was located on coastal cliffs in Kyan, Itoman city, at the southernmost tip of Okinawa Island, surrounded by sea on three sides. The fortifications measures 83 meters east-to-west and 33 meters north-to-south. The "Ichino-Kuruwa" (first bailey), which juts out into the sea like a peninsula. It was the main bailey of the gusuku, and remains of buildings have been confirmed. The "Nino-Kuruwa" (second bailey), was separated by a plaza from the first bailey, and has a hole known as the "Heefuchimi" (fire blowhole) or "Sufuchimi" (water blowhole), which leads to the coast. Traces of cut stone remain at the main gate.

According to the "Kumejima Gushikawa Magiri Kyuki" (compiled in 1743), Makanekui Anj, the lord of Gushikawa Castle on Kumejima, fled to this area on the main island after being attacked by Manikutaru Anj, the second son of Ishikinawa Anj, and built the castle of the same name. Archaeological excavations have unearthed Chinese ceramics, including celadon and white porcelain, suggesting that the castle existed from the late 12th century to the mid-15th century.

== Gallery ==
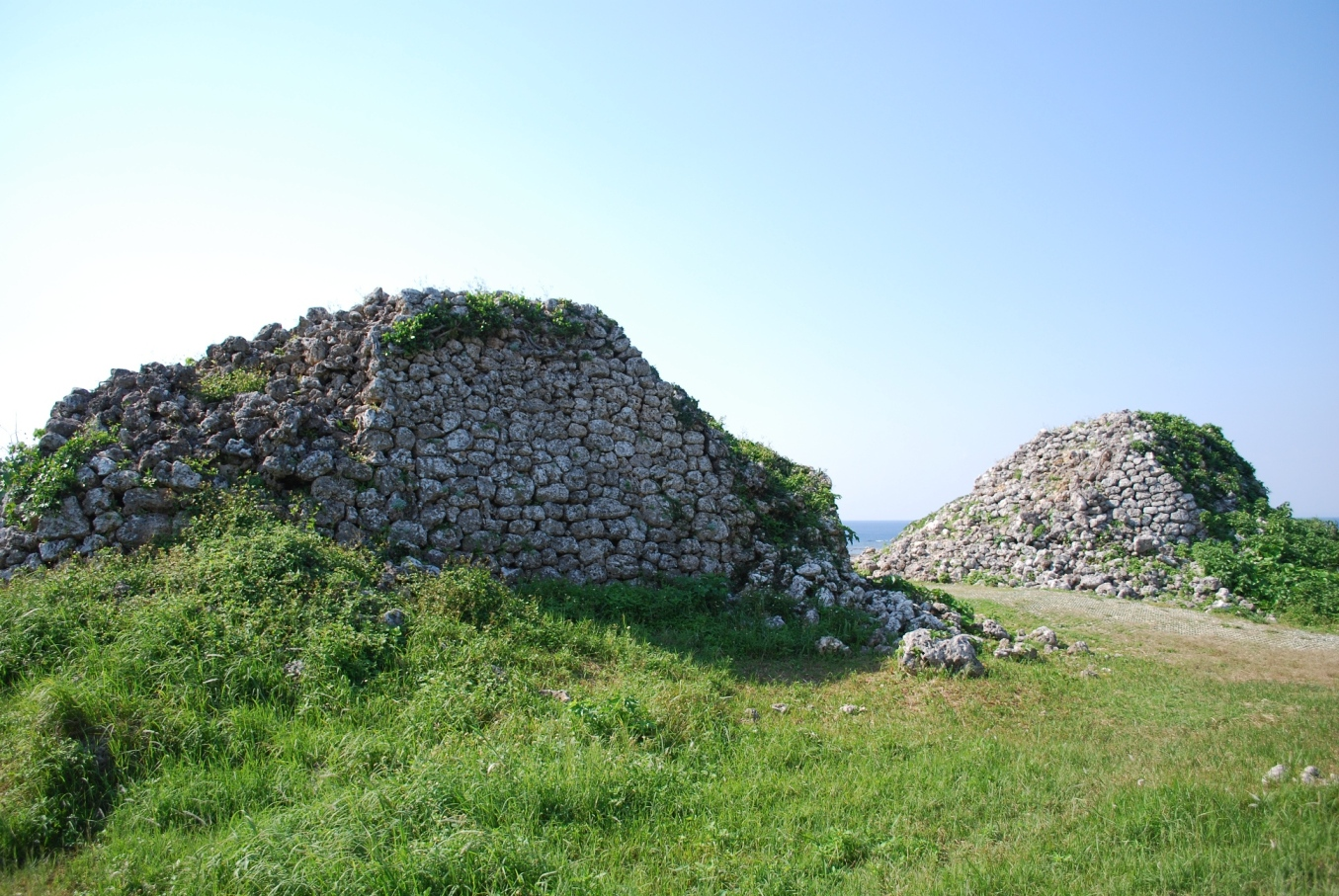
Castle gate

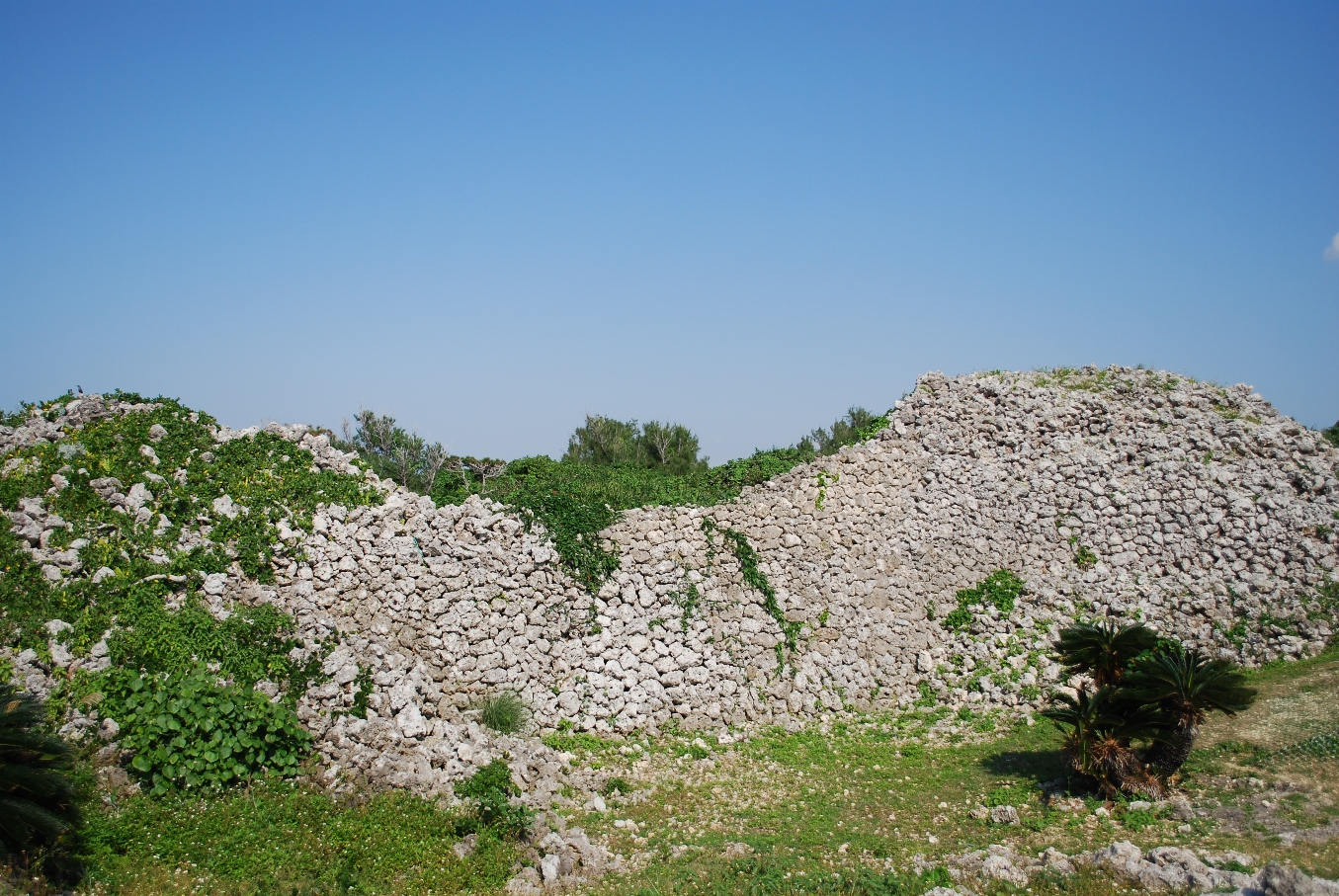
Castle gate (sea side)

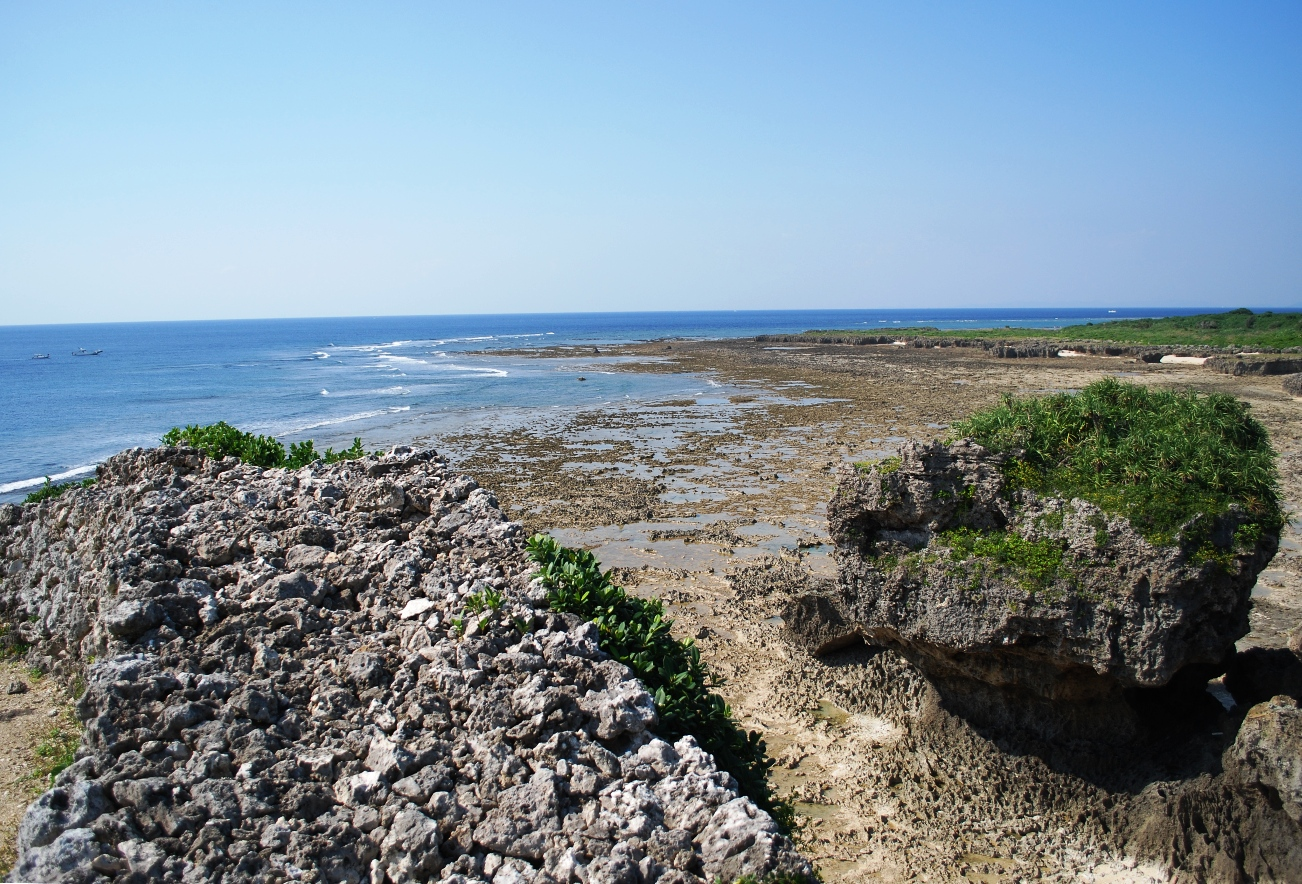
View from the castle walls

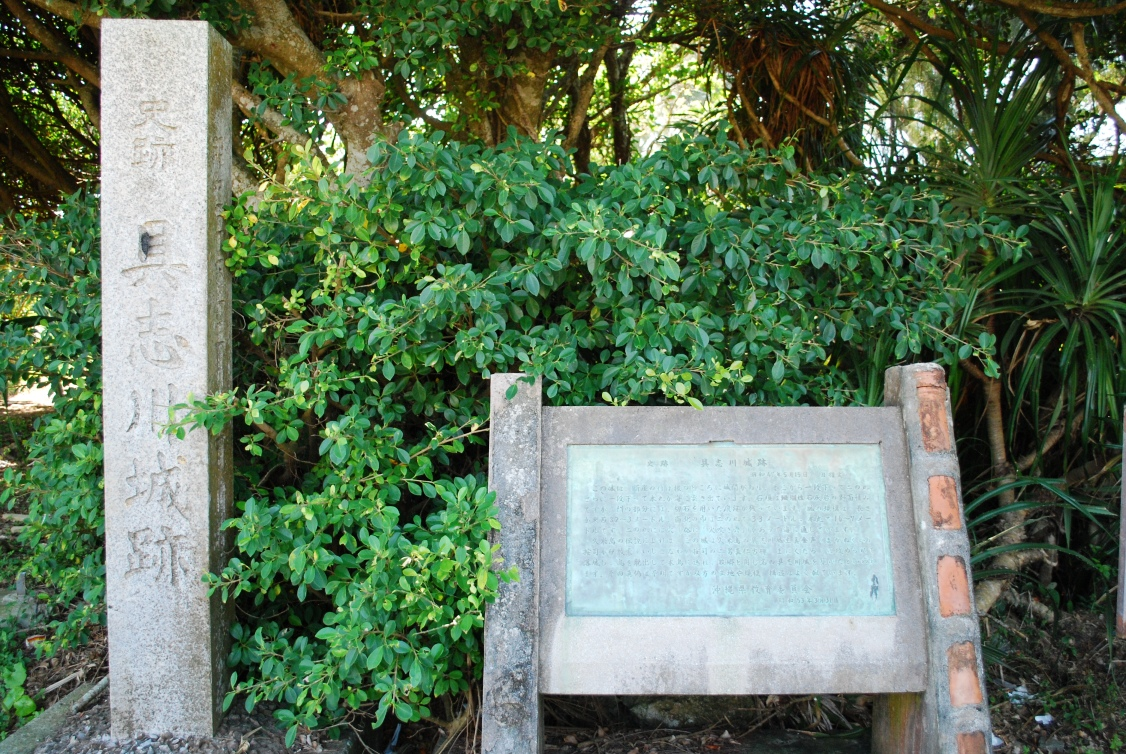
Entrance

== See also ==
- List of Historic Sites of Japan (Okinawa)
