= Ryūkyū-koku yurai-ki =

18th-century book on the Ryukyu Kingdom

Ryūkyū-koku yurai-ki (琉球国由来記; Records of the Origin of the Ryūkyū Kingdom) is a chorography compiled by the government of the Ryukyu Kingdom. It was the first chronography compiled by the royal government and was presented to King Shō Kei in 1713. It is an essential resource for Okinawan studies.

This book was largely written in Japanese. Later Tei Heitetsu (鄭秉哲) wrote its Kanbun translated version and titled it Ryūkyū-koku kyū-ki (琉球国旧記).

== Outline ==
The preface of the book, titled “Preface to the Records of the Origin of Various Matters” (諸事由来記序), states that it was presented to the king on the 11th lunar month of 1713 (Kangxi 52), which is a clear indication of the date of its establishment.

In addition, the “Preface to the Records of the Origin of Various Matters” describes the purpose of the book. It states that because the government did not have official chronicles, the origins of the various official formalities in the Forbidden Castle (Shuri) and of the ceremonies held each month and each year were not clear. This matter could not be considered lightly according to the Virtuous Government Principles, so that “our King” had his subject investigate the matter.

According to the “Commentary on the Ryūkyū-koku yurai-ki” written by Fuyū Iha, the ‘Our King’ mentioned in the “Preface to the Records of the Origin of Various Matters” is King Shō Kei, the 13th king of the Ryūkyū Kingdom. The same commentary also states that ‘this book should also be called the Engishiki (延喜式, "Procedures of the Engi Era") of the Ryukyu Islands.’

At the end of the “Preface to the Records of the Origin of Various Matters”, the following persons are listed as having been involved in the compilation of the book.

Sessei (Prime Minister)

Shō Yū Prince Tomigusuku Chōkyō 向祐（豊見城王子朝匡）

Sanshikan (Council of Three)

Shō Genryō Tashima Uēkata Chōyū 向元良（田嶋親方朝由）

Ō Shidō Ishadō Uēkata Seifu 翁自道（伊舎堂親方盛富）

Ma Kento Urasoe Uēkata Ryōi 馬献図（浦添親方良意）

Origins of the Old Rules Magistrates

Shō Ihei Nakazato Aji Chōei 向維屏（仲里按司朝英）

Ei Tokuan Itokazu Uēkata Chōchū 頴徳安（糸数親雲上朝忠）

Origins of the Old Rules Secretaries

Shō Iban Genga Uēkata Chōchū 向維藩（源河親雲上朝忠）

Shō Kōgyō Ukuda Uēkata Chōgū （宇久田親雲上朝遇）

In “Ancient Literature Lectures vol. 11: Record of Miraculous Events (霊異記 Reiiki), Clans Origins (氏文 Ujibumi) and Dependent arising (縁起 Engi)”, it is considered that the prime minister and the council of three, as the persons taking responsibility for the royal government, were only supervisors mentioned for administrative purposes, and that the actual research had been carried out by the Origins of the Old Rules Magistrates.

In the same book, it is said that the period of creation of the post of “Origins of the Old Rules Magistrate” is made quite clear by the mention in the genealogic records of the Sanshikan Tashima Chōyū of the creation of the “Old Records Office” on the 2nd day of the 3rd month of the lunar calendar of 1703 (Kangxi 42). Since we know the date of creation of the post of Origins of the Old Rules Magistrate, it can be deduced that the compilation of the Ryūkyū-koku yurai-ki lasted from the 2nd day of the 3rd lunar month of 1703 (Kangxi 42) to the 11th lunar month of 1713 (Kangxi 52).

The “Commentary on the Ryūkyū-koku yurai-ki” speculates that the Old Records Office was a temporary department, which was abolished with the completion of the book, as there is no mention of the position in the book's second volume, ‘Lists of the Official Posts’.

The same book also speculates that the Old Records Office became independent from the Genealogical Records Office (that had been established in 1689 (Kangxi 28)) shortly after the completion of the Genealogy Book of Chūzan (Chūzan Seifu, 中山世譜). With the completion of the Ryūkyū-koku yurai-ki the Old Records Office was abolished, with its affairs being taken over again by the Genealogical Records Office.

The same book (“Commentary on the Ryūkyū-koku yurai-ki”) states that for the various rituals of each place mentioned in the Ryūkyū-koku yurai-ki, instructions were sent to each Magiri Banjo (Guard House) [1] for the local magistrates to research and document the origins of the old rituals in their jurisdiction. It seems that information from those reports were then skimmed and rearranged to compile the book.

The submitted reports were gradually destroyed after the compilation was completed, so that only a few remain today [2], but a comparison of these reports and the book permits to see the general policy behind the compilation of the book.

In addition, there are mentions of the “Visible Ways of the Gods Account” (見神道記) in the chapters “Ameku Temple’s Great Gongen’s Origin” (天久山大権現縁起) and “Futenma Temple’s Three Location Great Gongen’s Origin” (普天満山三所大権現縁起) of the 11th volume of the Ryūkyū-koku yurai-ki (titled “Secret Origins of Various Temples”密門諸寺縁起), implying that several paragraphs of this volume referred to the Ryūkyū Shintō-ki (琉球神道記 “An account of the ways of the gods in Ryūkyū”), suggesting that the Ryūkyū Shintō-ki was used as a reference work when this volume was compiled.

== Configuration ==
The book consists of the following sections, but the “Commentary on the Ryūkyū-koku yurai-ki” states that the book can be divided into the first part, from volume 1 to volume 11, and the second part, in which local rituals are described, from volume 12 to volume 21.

The same Commentary also states that Volume 5 ‘Nakagusuku Utaki and Shuri Utaki year-round Rituals’ and the various Local Rituals of Volume 12 and after are in exactly the same form, and that Volume 6 ‘National Temples and Tama Udun’, Volume 9 ‘Complete Collection of Old Records of Tōei (Kume Island)', Volume 10 'Old Records of Various Temples' and Volume 11 'Secret Origins of Various Temples' are written in Chinese and their writing style does not match that of the other volumes, suggesting that the compilation process for this book may have been as follows.

It is assumed that the ‘Nakagusuku Utaki and Shuri Utaki year-round Rituals’ was compiled first, and used as a basis to compile the chapters about the various Local Rituals. Then, the records of the origins of various ceremonies, starting with the ‘Official Matters in the Royal Castle’ volume, were added afterwards and the book was named ‘Ryūkyū-koku Yurai-ki’ (Records of the Origins of the Ryukyu Kingdom).

Vol. 1 Official Matters in the Royal Castle

Vol. 2 Lists of the Official Posts

Vol. 3 Start of the Ritual Year qián (Summer Solstice)

Vol. 4 Start of the Ritual Year kūn (Winter Solstice)

Vol. 5 Nakagusuku Utaki and Shuri Utaki year-round Rituals

Vol. 6 National Temples / Tama Udun

Vol. 7 Records of the Origins of Tomari Village

Vol. 8 Records of the Origins of Naha

Vol. 9 Complete Collection of Old Records of Tōei (Kume Island)

Vol. 10 Old Records of Various Temples

Vol. 11 Secret Origins of Various Temples

Vol. 12 Local Rituals 1: The Eight Magiris of West Shimajiri

Vol. 13 Local Rituals 2: The Seven Magiris of East Shimajiri

Vol. 14 Local Rituals 3: The Eleven Magiris of Nakagami

Vol. 15 Local Rituals 4: The Nine Magiris of Kunigami

Vol. 16 Local Rituals 5: Ie Island / Iheya Island

Vol. 17 Local Rituals 6: Aguni Island / Tonaki Island / Idesuna in the same archipelago (as Tonaki) / Tori Island

Vol. 18 Local Rituals 7: The Two Magiris of Kerama Island

Vol. 19 Local Rituals 8: The Two Magiris of Kume Island

Vol. 20 Local Rituals 9: Miyako Island

Vol. 21 Local Rituals 10: Yaeyama Island

== See also ==
- Ryūkyū Shintō-ki

== Notes ==
1. Magiri Office.
2. The “Commentary on the Ryūkyū-koku yurai-ki” introduces the “Kume Nakazato Magiri Old Records”, the “Kume Gushikawa Magiri Old Records”, the “Origins and Kume’s Chinbē and Rank Ceremonies”, the “Kerama Island Tokashiki Magiri Origin Records”, the “Miyako Island Old Records”, the “Yaeyama Island Old Records” and the “Naha Origin Records”. Among these, the “Kume Nakazato Magiri Old Records” is a document that was found in the residence of an old household of Kume Island at the beginning of the Shōwa Period and the book suggests that if all the residences of the old households were to be searched, such documents might be found again.
