= Kume Island =

Island within Ryukyu Islands

Native name: クミジマ(Kumijima)
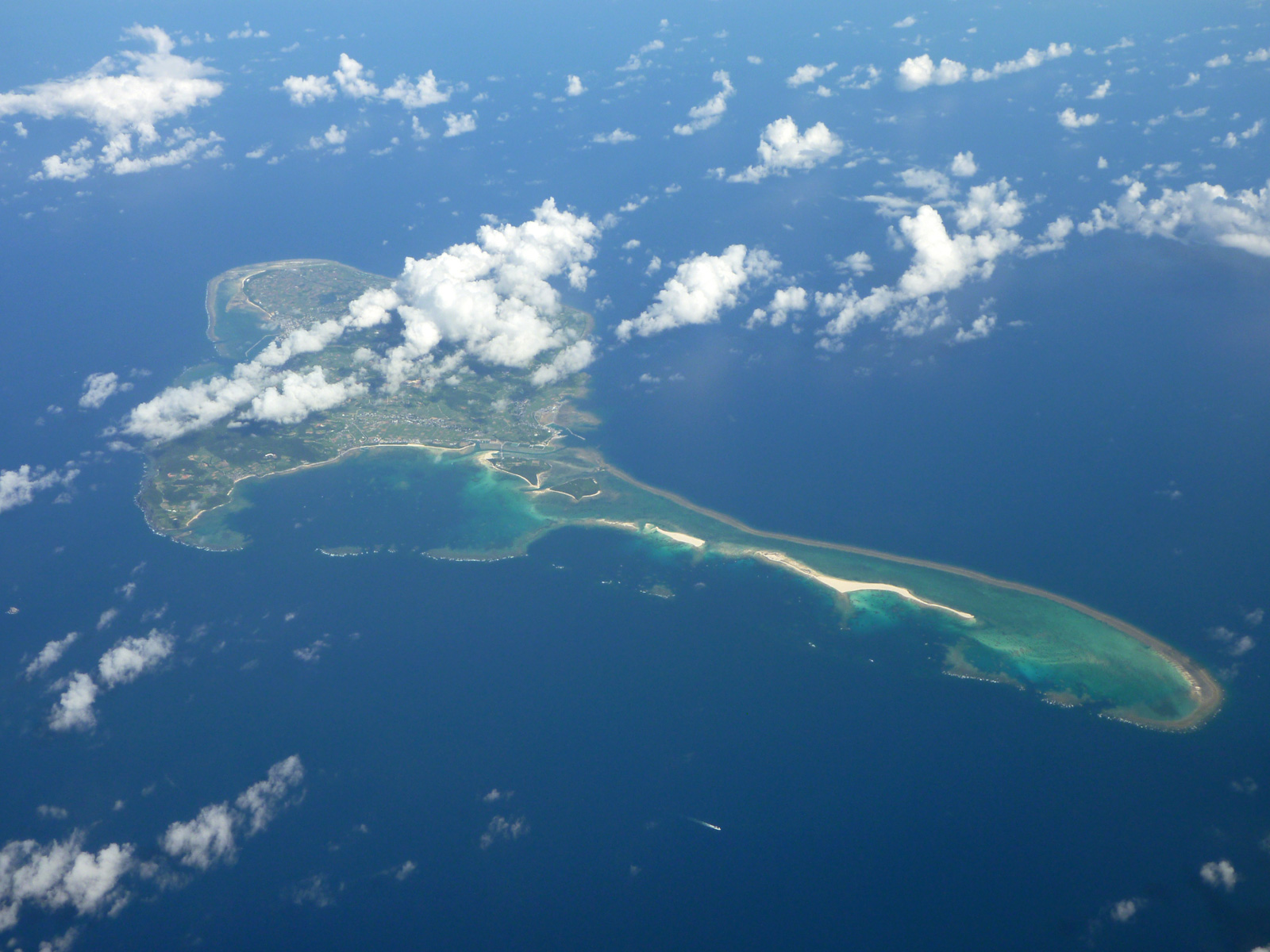
- Kumejima Island 2009

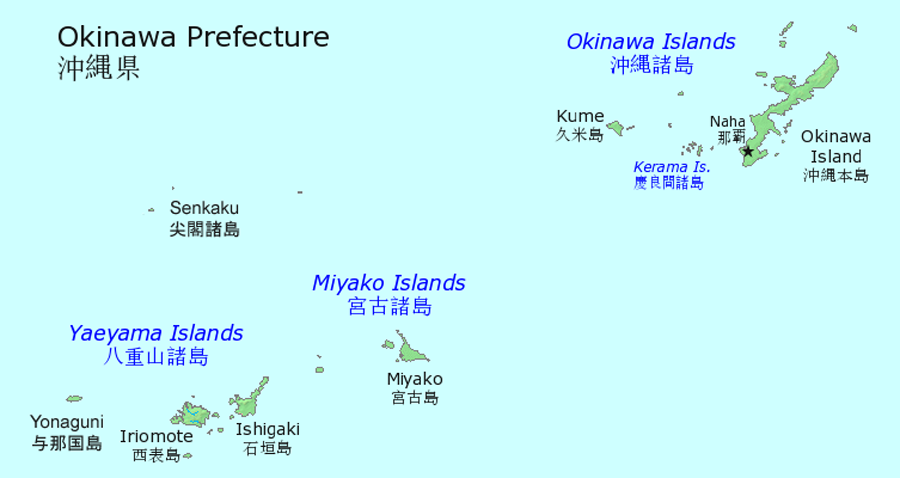

Geography
- Location: Pacific Ocean
- Coordinates: 26°20′28″N 126°48′18″E
- Archipelago: Okinawa Islands
- Area: 59.11 km^{2} (22.82 sq mi)

Administration
- Japan
- Prefecture: Okinawa Prefecture

Demographics
- Population: 8,713 (2010)
- Ethnic groups: Ryukyuan, Japanese

Kume Island (久米島, Kumejima; Okinawan: クミジマ Kumijima) is an island, part of the Okinawa Islands and administratively part of the town of Kumejima, Okinawa Prefecture, Japan. It has an area of 59.11 square kilometres (22.82 mi^{2}). The island had a population of 8,713 (2010).

Kume Island is a volcanic island. Its principal economic activities are the production of sugarcane and tourism.

== Climate ==
Climate data for Kumejima (1991−2020 normals, extremes 1958−present)
Month	Jan	Feb	Mar	Apr	May	Jun	Jul	Aug	Sep	Oct	Nov	Dec	Year
Record high °C (°F)	27.4 (81.3)	27.0 (80.6)	28.7 (83.7)	30.2 (86.4)	32.1 (89.8)	33.7 (92.7)	34.7 (94.5)	35.3 (95.5)	34.5 (94.1)	32.7 (90.9)	30.2 (86.4)	29.4 (84.9)	35.3 (95.5)
Mean daily maximum °C (°F)	19.5 (67.1)	20.0 (68.0)	21.8 (71.2)	24.3 (75.7)	27.0 (80.6)	29.9 (85.8)	32.0 (89.6)	31.8 (89.2)	30.5 (86.9)	27.9 (82.2)	24.9 (76.8)	21.4 (70.5)	25.9 (78.6)
Daily mean °C (°F)	17.0 (62.6)	17.3 (63.1)	19.0 (66.2)	21.5 (70.7)	24.2 (75.6)	27.2 (81.0)	29.0 (84.2)	28.9 (84.0)	27.7 (81.9)	25.3 (77.5)	22.4 (72.3)	19.0 (66.2)	23.2 (73.8)
Mean daily minimum °C (°F)	14.6 (58.3)	14.8 (58.6)	16.3 (61.3)	19.0 (66.2)	21.8 (71.2)	25.1 (77.2)	26.7 (80.1)	26.5 (79.7)	25.3 (77.5)	23.2 (73.8)	20.3 (68.5)	16.6 (61.9)	20.8 (69.5)
Record low °C (°F)	2.9 (37.2)	4.0 (39.2)	3.2 (37.8)	6.8 (44.2)	12.9 (55.2)	16.4 (61.5)	20.4 (68.7)	19.8 (67.6)	15.5 (59.9)	11.6 (52.9)	9.0 (48.2)	5.4 (41.7)	2.9 (37.2)
Average precipitation mm (inches)	138.3 (5.44)	141.2 (5.56)	195.5 (7.70)	196.8 (7.75)	260.3 (10.25)	307.4 (12.10)	154.4 (6.08)	197.7 (7.78)	235.6 (9.28)	152.7 (6.01)	129.6 (5.10)	134.0 (5.28)	2,243.5 (88.33)
Average precipitation days (≥ 1.0 mm)	12.7	11.7	13.0	11.5	12.0	11.2	7.9	9.8	10.6	8.6	9.0	10.7	128.7
Average relative humidity (%)	68	70	73	76	80	84	80	80	78	73	70	68	75
Mean monthly sunshine hours	75.2	80.1	107.6	118.4	136.2	158.9	250.3	231.9	198.6	162.3	108.3	89.9	1,717.8
Source: Japan Meteorological Agency

== See also ==
- Uegusuku Castle
