= Kumejima, Okinawa =

Kumejima 久米島町
- Town
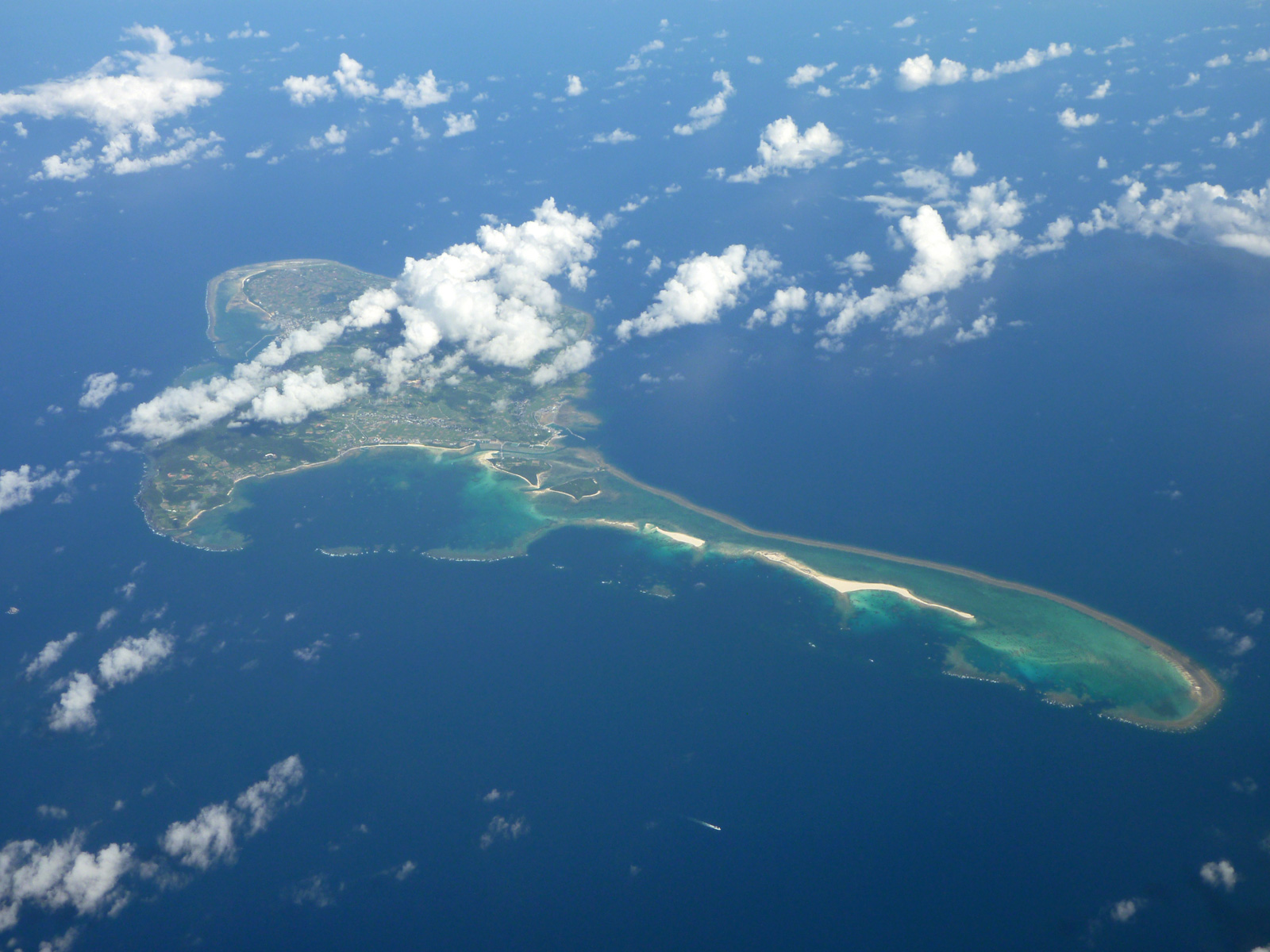
- Aerial view

- Flag Emblem

- Location of Kumejima in Okinawa Prefecture

- Location in Japan
- Coordinates: 26°20′27″N 126°48′18″E
- Country: Japan
- Region: Kyushu (Ryukyu)
- Prefecture: Okinawa Prefecture
- District: Shimajiri

Government
  - Mayor: Hideo Tōbaru

Area
  - Total: 63.5 km^{2} (24.5 sq mi)

Population (October 2020)
  - Total: 7,192
  - Density: 113/km^{2} (293/sq mi)
- Time zone: UTC+09:00 (JST)
- Climate: Cfa
- Website: www.town.kumejima.okinawa.jp

Kumejima (Japanese: 久米島町, Hepburn: Kumejima-chō; Okinawan: Kumishima) is a town located in Shimajiri District, Okinawa Prefecture, Japan. The town consists of the islands of Kume, Ōjima, Ōhajima, Torishima, and Iōtorishima. Among the islands, only Kumejima and Ōjima are populated. Kumejima is located approximately 100 kilometres (62 mi) west of Naha. The town can be accessed by the New Kumejima Ferry, Japan Transocean Air, or Ryukyu Air Commuter. Kumejima Airport serves the island. As of 1 October 2020, the town had an estimated population of 7,192 and a population density of 110 inhabitants per square kilometre (280/sq mi). The total area is 63.50 km^{2} (24.52 sq mi).

Kume Island is often said to be one of the most beautiful of the Okinawa Islands. It is well known for its textiles, called Kumejima-tsumugi which are designated an Important Intangible Cultural Property. The town is also known for its Kumesen Awamori (Okinawan sake) and deep sea water. Kumejima's main industries are sugar cane (sato-kibi), tourism, and deep seawater products.

== History ==
Historically due to Kume's abundance of freshwater, rice was once extensively cultivated. In 1506, the Ryukyu Kingdom invaded Kume under the leadership of Shō Shin. During Ryukyuan rule, Kume Island was often visited by Chinese envoys called "sapposhi" on their way to Shuri Castle on Okinawa Island. When the Ryukyu Kingdom was annexed by Japan, many noble families moved from Shuri to Kume.

At the end of World War 2, Japanese troops led by Tadashi Kayama refused to accept the surrender of Japan and killed 20 islanders suspected of being spies or collaborators, including a baby and children.

== Geography ==
An area of 119 km^{2} (46 sq mi) of land and sea is protected as the Kumejima Prefectural Natural Park and 255 ha (630 acres) of wetland have been designated a Ramsar Site.

Numerous unique rock formations around the island can be viewed including Tatami Rocks, Bird Mouth Rock, Miifugaa, Garasaa Mountain, Tachijami, and the Yajiyagama Cave system.

=== Administrative divisions ===
The town includes twenty-seven wards.

- Aka (阿嘉)
- Gima (儀間)
- Gushikawa (具志川)
- Higa (比嘉)
- Hiyajō (比屋定)
- Itōtorishima (硫黄鳥島)
- Janadō (謝名堂)
- Kadekaru (嘉手苅)
- Kanegusuku (兼城)
- Kitahara (北原)
- Magari (真我里)
- Maja (真謝)
- Nakachi (仲地)
- Nakadomari (仲泊)
- Nakandakari (仲村渠)
- Nishime (西銘)
- Ōhara (大原)
- Ōta (大田)
- Ou (奥武)
- Shimajiri (島尻)
- Torishima (鳥島)
- Uegusuku (宇江城)
- Uezu (上江洲)
- Une (宇根)
- Yamagusuku (山城)
- Yamazato (山里)
- Zenda (銭田)

== Climate ==
Kumejima has a humid subtropical climate (Köppen climate classification Cfa) bordering on a tropical rainforest climate (Köppen Af) with very warm summers and mild winters. Precipitation is abundant throughout the year; the wettest month is May and the driest month is July.

Climate data for Kumejima (1991−2020 normals, extremes 1958−present)
Month	Jan	Feb	Mar	Apr	May	Jun	Jul	Aug	Sep	Oct	Nov	Dec	Year
Record high °C (°F)	27.4 (81.3)	27.0 (80.6)	28.7 (83.7)	30.2 (86.4)	32.1 (89.8)	33.7 (92.7)	34.9 (94.8)	35.3 (95.5)	34.5 (94.1)	34.1 (93.4)	30.9 (87.6)	29.4 (84.9)	35.3 (95.5)
Mean maximum °C (°F)	24.6 (76.3)	25.2 (77.4)	26.6 (79.9)	28.3 (82.9)	30.3 (86.5)	32.3 (90.1)	33.4 (92.1)	33.3 (91.9)	32.6 (90.7)	30.6 (87.1)	28.5 (83.3)	26.1 (79.0)	33.6 (92.5)
Mean daily maximum °C (°F)	19.5 (67.1)	20.0 (68.0)	21.8 (71.2)	24.3 (75.7)	27.0 (80.6)	29.9 (85.8)	32.0 (89.6)	31.8 (89.2)	30.5 (86.9)	27.9 (82.2)	24.9 (76.8)	21.4 (70.5)	25.9 (78.6)
Daily mean °C (°F)	17.0 (62.6)	17.3 (63.1)	19.0 (66.2)	21.5 (70.7)	24.2 (75.6)	27.2 (81.0)	29.0 (84.2)	28.9 (84.0)	27.7 (81.9)	25.3 (77.5)	22.4 (72.3)	19.0 (66.2)	23.2 (73.8)
Mean daily minimum °C (°F)	14.6 (58.3)	14.8 (58.6)	16.3 (61.3)	19.0 (66.2)	21.8 (71.2)	25.1 (77.2)	26.7 (80.1)	26.5 (79.7)	25.3 (77.5)	23.2 (73.8)	20.3 (68.5)	16.6 (61.9)	20.8 (69.5)
Mean minimum °C (°F)	9.0 (48.2)	9.3 (48.7)	10.3 (50.5)	13.4 (56.1)	17.1 (62.8)	20.8 (69.4)	24.2 (75.6)	24.0 (75.2)	21.9 (71.4)	19.1 (66.4)	15.6 (60.1)	10.9 (51.6)	7.8 (46.0)
Record low °C (°F)	2.9 (37.2)	4.0 (39.2)	3.2 (37.8)	6.8 (44.2)	12.9 (55.2)	16.4 (61.5)	20.4 (68.7)	19.8 (67.6)	15.5 (59.9)	11.6 (52.9)	9.0 (48.2)	5.4 (41.7)	2.9 (37.2)
Average precipitation mm (inches)	138.3 (5.44)	141.2 (5.56)	195.5 (7.70)	196.8 (7.75)	260.3 (10.25)	307.4 (12.10)	154.4 (6.08)	197.7 (7.78)	235.6 (9.28)	152.7 (6.01)	129.6 (5.10)	134.0 (5.28)	2,243.5 (88.33)
Average precipitation days (≥ 1.0 mm)	12.7	11.7	13.0	11.5	12.0	11.2	7.9	9.8	10.6	8.6	9.0	10.7	128.7
Average relative humidity (%)	68	70	73	76	80	84	80	80	78	73	70	68	75
Mean monthly sunshine hours	75.2	80.1	107.6	118.4	136.2	158.9	250.3	231.9	198.6	162.3	108.3	89.9	1,717.8
Source: Japan Meteorological Agency

== Education ==
Okinawa Prefectural Board of Education operates Kumejima High School.

Kumejima Town operates municipal elementary and junior high schools.

Junior high schools:

- Kumejima Nishi Junior High School (久米島西中学校)
- Kumi Junior High School (球美中学校)

Elementary schools:

- Hiyajiyo (比屋定小学校)
- Kumeshima (久米島小学校)
- Misaki (美崎小学校)
- Nakazato (仲里小学校)
- Otake (大岳小学校)
- Shimizu (清水小学校)

== Culture ==
Uezu House is a traditional Ryukyuan Governor's house dating back hundreds of years. The walled grounds contain gardens, a main house, and outlying buildings. The house is a quiet and peaceful look back into the history of Okinawa.

In order to maintain and preserve the historic estate, there is a 300 yen entry fee for adults, payable at the house. If an attendant is not available, it is customary to leave the amount in a tray.

There are five castle sites on Kume Island that can be visited. The most prominent is Uegusuku Castle on Mount Uegusuku, which is the highest situated castle in Okinawa Prefecture. Gushikawa Castle is also designated a National Treasure.

== Cultural Properties ==
There are sixty-three cultural properties in Kumejima Town.

- Name (Japanese) (Type of registration)

=== Cultural Properties ===
- Anchor Stone from Uegusuku Castle (宇江城城跡の碇石) (Municipal)
- Criminal Records (科人公事帳) (Municipal)
- Former Nakazato Magiri Warehouse stone walls (旧仲里間切蔵元石牆) (National)
- Kominato Matsubara Tomb (小港松原墓) (Municipal)
- Painting: flowers and birds, colour on silk, by Son'oku (絹本着色花鳥図孫億筆) (Prefectural)
- Portrait of Kikumura Keisō (Katami Jitudē), colour on paper (紙本着色喜久村絜聡(片目地頭代)像) (Prefectural)
- Public records of Kume Nakazato Magiri (久米仲里間切公事帳) (Municipal)
- Public records of the villages of Kume Nakazato Magiri (久米仲里間切諸村公事帳) (Municipal)
- Round Black Lacquer Outer Box with Chrysanthemums, Flowers, Birds, and Insects, Chinkin Technique (黒塗菊花鳥虫沈金丸外櫃) (Prefectural)
- Round Green Lacquer Inner Box with Phoenixes and Clouds, Chinkin Technique (緑塗鳳凰雲沈金丸内櫃) (Prefectural)
- Tenkō-gū Shrine (天后宮) (Prefecture)
- Uezu Family Documents (上江洲家資料) (Prefectural)
- Uezu Family Residence (上江洲家住宅) (National)

=== Folk Cultural Properties ===
- Taizan ishigantō stone (泰山石敢當) (Municipal)

=== Historic Sites ===
- Chinaha Castle Site (伊敷索城跡) (Prefectural)
- Chinpē Dunchi Praying Site (君南風殿内) (Municipal)
- Dakidun Uganju Praying Site and its Large Banyan Tree (武富拝所と大ガジュマル) (Municipal)
- Gushikawa Castle Site (具志川城跡) (National)
- Gushikawa Magiri Kuramoto (Administrative Office) Site (具志川間切蔵元跡) (Municipal)
- Hantabaru Site (ハンタ原遺跡) (Municipal)
- Hōtoku Jinja Shrine (報徳神社) (Municipal)
- Ishidōnī Rock (石塘根) (Municipal)
- Kanegusuku Utaki Sacred Site and plant community (兼城御嶽と植物群落) (Municipal)
- Kume Island Ōhara Shell Mound (久米島大原貝塚) (Prefectural)
- Nakazato Magiri Kuramoto (Administrative Office) Site (仲里間切蔵元跡) (Prefectural)
- Namida Ishi (Tears Rock) (涙石) (Municipal)
- Nana Utaki Jinja Shrine (七嶽神社) (Municipal)
- Shimojibaru Cave Site (下地原洞穴遺跡) (Municipal)
- Shimojibaru Shell Mound (下地原貝塚) (Municipal)
- Shimojibaru Site (下地原遺跡) (Municipal)
- Sonami Beacon (ソナミの烽火台) (Municipal)
- Stone Tomb of Shimajiri (島尻の石墓) (Municipal)
- Suhara Castle Site (スハラ城跡・塩原城跡) (Municipal)
- Tunnaha Castle Site (登武那覇城跡) (Municipal)
- Uegusuku Castle Site (宇江城城跡) (National)
- Utida Stone (ウティダ石) (Prefectural)
- Utida Stone of Shimajiri (島尻のウティダ石) (Municipal)
- Watchtower Office Site (遠見番所跡) (Municipal)
- Yamato Tomari Coast (大和泊海岸) (Municipal)

=== Places of scenic beauty ===
- Aka-gurushi Hill (阿嘉黒石) (Municipal)
- Aka-no-Higemizu Waterfall (阿嘉のひげ水) (Municipal)
- Hiyajō-banta Cliff (比屋定バンタ) (Municipal)
- Tokujimu Coast and Andesite Cobble Area (トクジム海岸と一帯の安山岩) (Municipal)
- Ueda Forest (上田森) (Municipal)

=== Natural Monuments ===
- Anmāgusuku Rock (天宮城) (Municipal)
- Bedrock in the area of Ikkachi (fish stone wall) (イッカチ（魚垣）一帯の岩石) (Municipal)
- Dianthus superbus (flower) (カワラナデシコ) (Municipal)
- Giant Sago Palm Tree Cycas revoluta of Une (宇根の大ソテツ) (Prefectural)
- Kume Goeda-no-matsu Pine Tree (久米の五枝のマツ) (National)
- Lone Pine Tree of Kumibaru Utaki (米原御嶽の一本松) (Municipal)
- Lone Pine Tree of Sesu (瀬寿の一本松) (Municipal)
- Maja beautiful fukugi tree lane (真謝のチュラフクギ) (Prefectural)
- Pine tree lane of Takinda (タキンダの松並木) (Municipal)
- Sea almond and deigo tree of Nangijō Praying Site (南謝門のコバテイシとデイゴ) (Municipal)
- Sea almonds and banyan trees of Kumejima Elementary School (久米島小学校のコバテイシとガジュマル) (Municipal)
- Sea almonds and banyan trees of Nakazato Elementary School (仲里小学校のコバテイシとガジュマル) (Municipal)
- Sea almond of Gima Shiradōgura (儀間志良堂蔵のコバテイシ) (Municipal)
- Six Pine Trees of Ikeda (池田の六本松) (Municipal)
- Tachijami Rock (タチジャミ) (Municipal)
- Tatami-ishi rock formation of Ou Island (久米島町奥武島の畳石) (National)
- Ūrii Utaki area plant community (ウーリー御嶽一帯の植物群落) (Municipal)

== Deep Seawater and OTEC ==
Since 2001, the Okinawa Prefecture Deep Seawater Research Institute has researched the uses of deep seawater on Kumejima, fostering the development of new aquaculture and production industries totaling $20 million in yearly revenue. Due to the deep seawater resource, Kumejima now has the largest market share of Sea Grapes and Kuruma Prawns in Japan.

In March 2013, Okinawa Prefecture completed the world's only fully operational Ocean Thermal Energy Conversion Demonstration Facility. The facility is open to tours by appointment for free.

== Notable people ==
- Seiko Miyazato, historian and writer who wrote the lyrics to the "Song of Okinawa Prefecture"

== Sister cities ==
- Hawaiʻi County, Hawaiʻi, United States

== Gallery ==
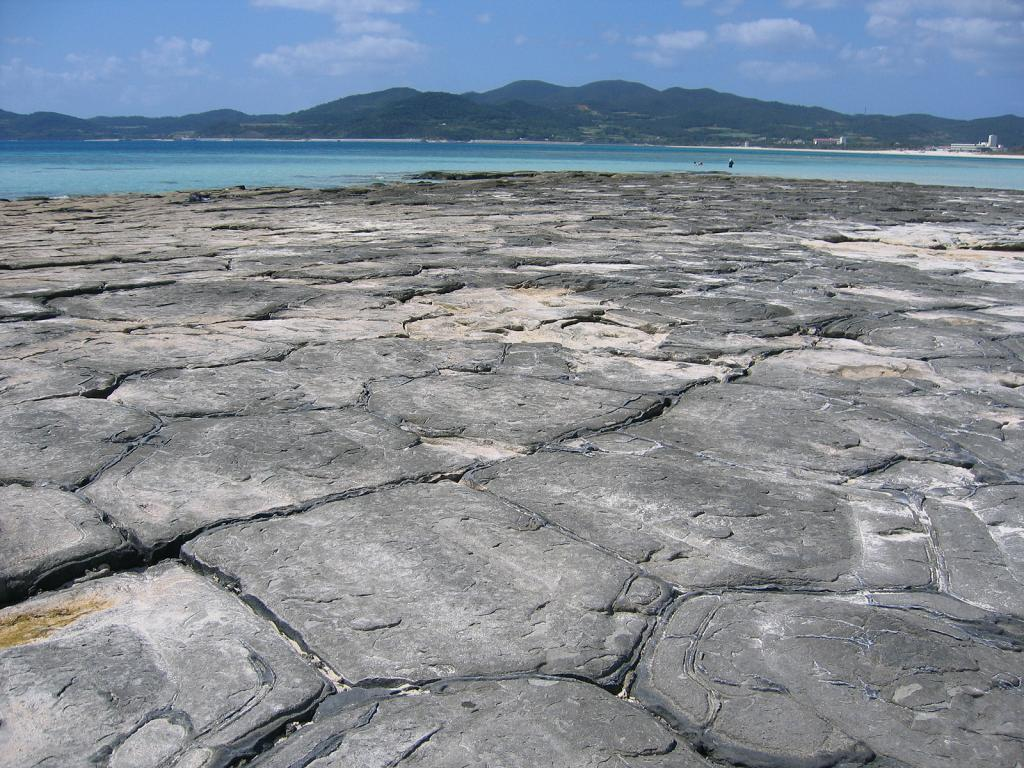
Tatami-ishi
