= Daughter of Katsuren Aji =

Queen of the Kingdom of Chūzan

Daughter of Katsuren Aji 勝連按司之女
- Queen of Chūzan

Queen consort of the Kingdom of Chūzan
- Tenure: 1350-?
- Predecessor: queen of Seii
- Successor: queen of Bunei
- Spouse: Satto
- Issue: Sachiyama Satunushi ♂ Bunei ♂ Lord of Goeku Castle ♂

"Daughter of Katsuren Aji" (勝連按司之女) is the name under which the queen consort of the first king of the Satto dynasty, Satto, is known. The Satto dynasty reigned over the central part of Okinawa Island (Kingdom of Chūzan) during the second half of the 14th century and the beginning of the 15th century. Her personal name, as well as her birth and death dates, are not given in the official sources of Ryūkyūan history (Chūzan Seikan, Chūzan Seifu…).,,

== Union with Satto ==
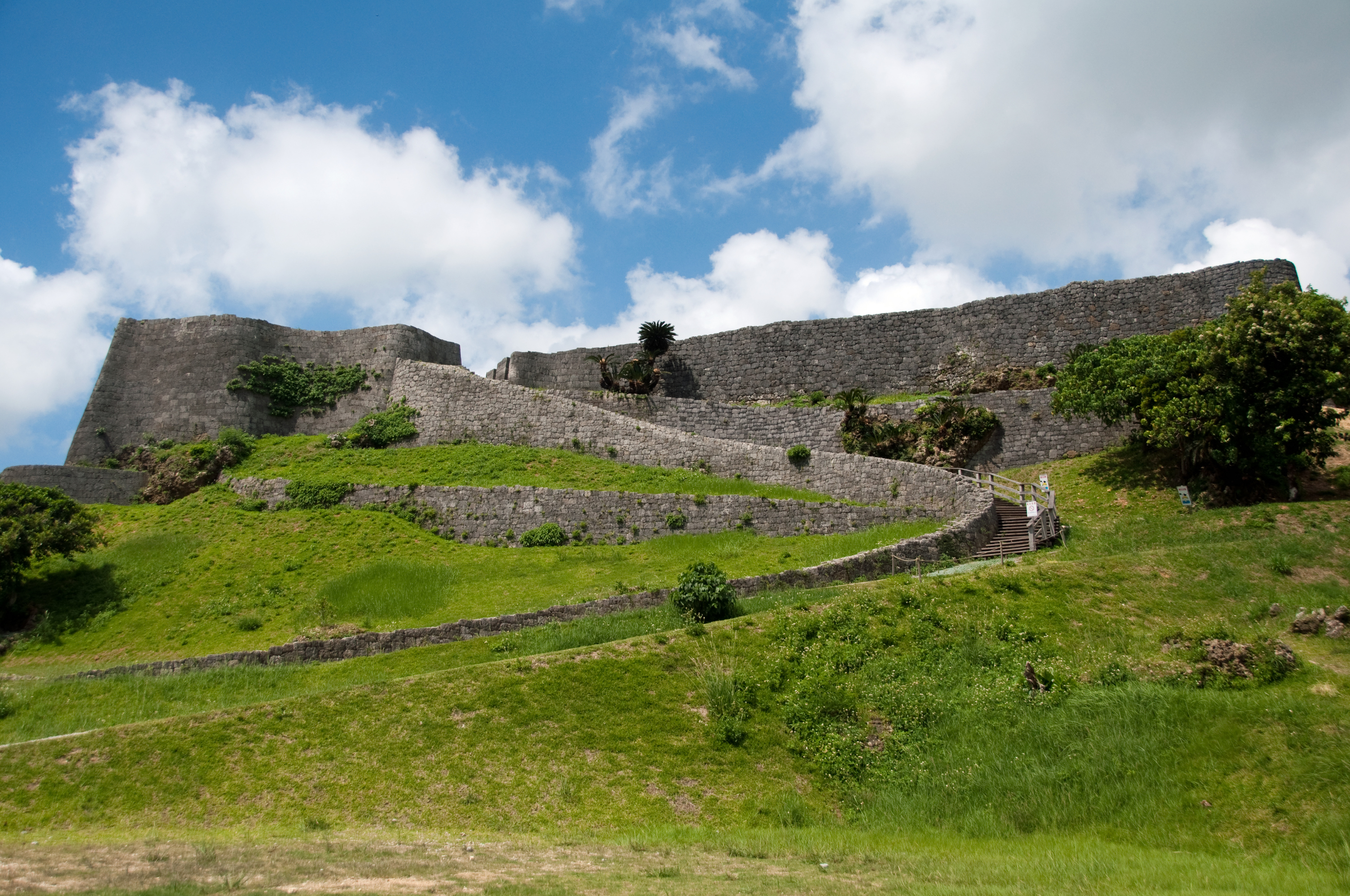
Katsuren Gusuku

The texts concerning Satto are highly fictionalised and include many legendary elements. The Chūzan Seifu and the Kyūyō mention that the daughter of Katsuren Aji who married Satto was both talented and beautiful,, the Chūzan Seikan describes her as being of rare kindness and beauty..

She refuses to mary many lords before she catches sight of Satto who has come to Katsuren in order to ask for her hand in marriage and sees in him the qualities she seeks in a husband. She declares to her father that she wants to marry him. Katsuren Aji, who had to rebuke until then a large number of powerful lords, first stands against this union with a modest man. She replies that he is not an ordinary man and that he will certainly make her fortune. Since she was lauded for her wisdom, Katsuren Aji finally complies with her daughter’s decision. He tries however to bury her under precious gifts to ease her future life, but Satto gets offended and she decides to decline her father’s gifts.,

== Political and economical role ==
According to the legend, when she arrives at Satto’s house, she realises that his residence Kuganinā (黄金宮) and his fields are full of gold and silver and teaches her husband the value of those metals. She hires through her father a number of craftsmen and goldsmiths and lays the foundations of Satto’s fortune.,

Satto is depicted as a mischievous and lazy lad before his wedding, but as a wise and generous man after his union with the daughter of Katsuren aji. The couple gives clothes and food to the people in need and iron tools to the peasants, and the popularity created by those generous actions will lead to Satto’s rise to power first as Urasoe Aji and then as king of Chūzan.,

== Issue ==
Her son Bunei is the second and last king of the Satto dynasty. Several traditions mention two other sons, Sachiyama Satunushi and the lord of Goeku Castle (越来城主). Sachiyama Satunushi is considered as the founding ancestor of the Tō (東) clan and the builder of Nanmin shrine. Satto would have had Goeku Gusuku built for his third son, known under the name of "lord of Gusuku Castle" or of "prince of Goeku" (越来王子).
