= Gusuku Period =

Historical period of the Ryukyu Islands

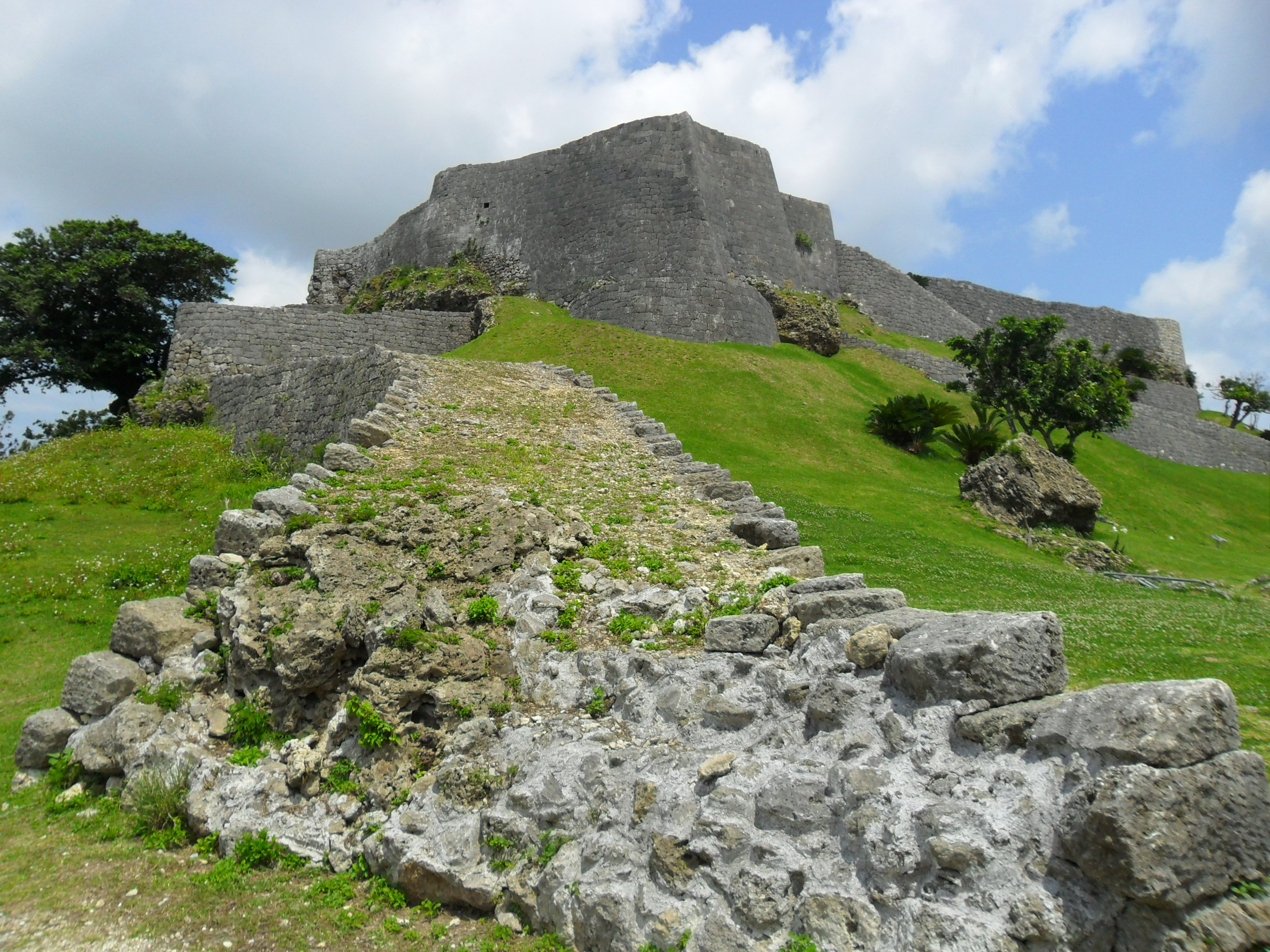
- The ruins of Katsuren gusuku, Uruma, Okinawa
- Geographical range: Ryukyu Islands
- Period: Post-classical
- Dates: c. 1050 CE–c. 1429 CE
- Characteristics: Gusuku, adoption of agriculture, increased trade connections, introduction of Japonic languages
- Preceded by: Shellmidden Period
- Followed by: Ryukyu Kingdom
Map
- The Gusuku culture spanned the Ryukyu Islands

The Gusuku Period (グスク時代, Gusuku jidai) is an era in the history of the Ryukyu Islands, an island chain now part of Japan. The period corresponds to the spread of agriculture and Japonic culture from Japan alongside increased social organization, eventually leading to endemic warfare and the construction of the namesake gusuku fortresses. Following the Shellmidden Period, (Note: c. 5000 BCE to the 11th century CE) the Gusuku is generally described as beginning in the 11th century after a dramatic social and economic shift over the previous centuries. The Shellmidden–Gusuku transition has been linked to Japonic-speaking migrants and influence from a Japanese trade outpost on the island of Kikai, leading to the emergence of the Proto-Ryukyuan language, the common ancestor of the modern Ryukyuan languages.

The period saw widespread agriculture across the archipelago, including the cultivation of foxtail millet, rice, barley, and wheat. Trade occurred with China, Korea, and Japan, including imports of ceramics and the export of mother of pearl. A unique form of vernacular architecture arose in the region, featuring elevated village houses, initially defended by palisades. The rise of the local nobility led to the steady expansion of fortifications, eventually evolving into the gusuku. The gusuku were large stone fortresses built in the hundreds across the archipelago, especially on Okinawa and Amami Ōshima.

By the 14th century, three kingdoms (the Sanzan) emerged on Okinawa as tributary kingdoms to the Ming Dynasty of China. Rather than territorial states, these may have been confederations of powerful local rulers who declared themselves kings within the Chinese tribute system. In 1429, King Shō Hashi of Chūzan became the sole tribute king, although he likely failed to achieve complete political control over Okinawa. After a series of short-reigning kings and violent succession disputes, Shō Shin conquered much of the Ryukyu Islands and governed from Shuri Castle in Shuri, Okinawa, marking the start of the centralized Ryukyu Kingdom and the end of the Gusuku Period.

== Background ==
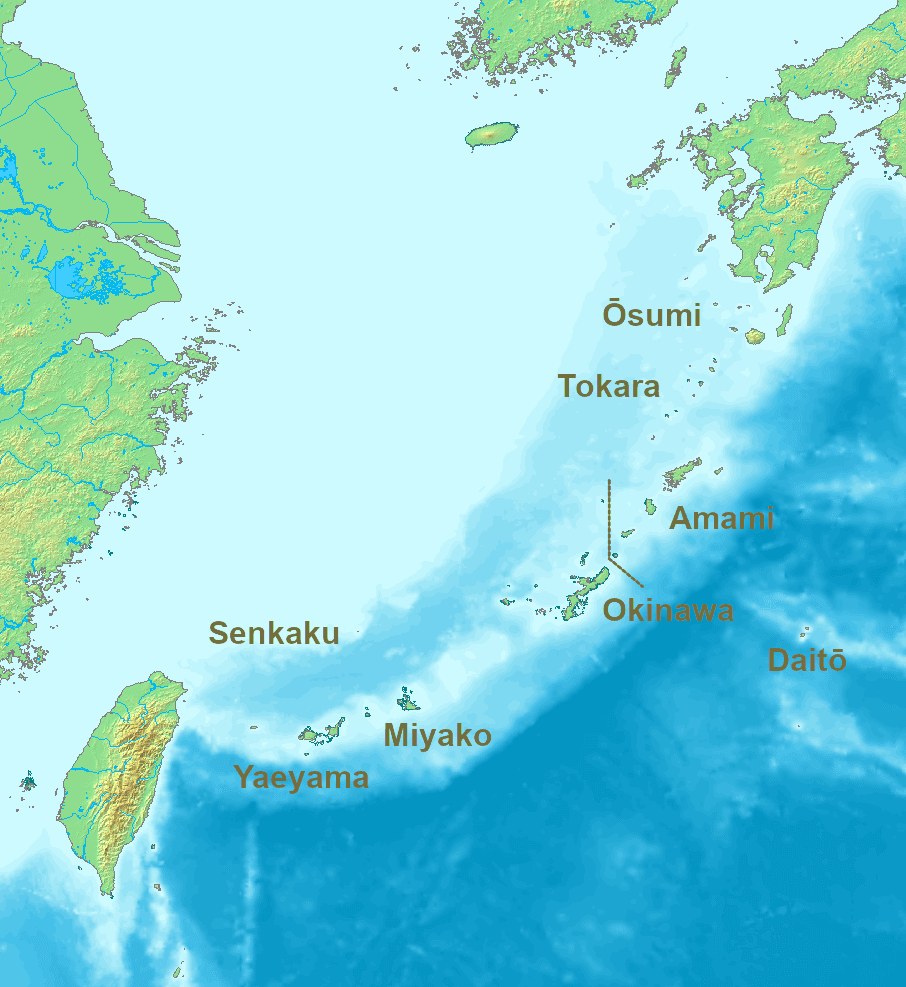
Island groups of the Ryukyu Islands

The Ryukyu Islands are an island chain on the eastern rim of the East China Sea, adjacent to the islands of Taiwan in the southwest and Kyushu to the northeast. The largest island of the chain is Okinawa, followed by Amami Ōshima (or simply Amami). During the glacial periods of the Pleistocene, land bridges connected the Ryukyus with the mainland via Taiwan, although the period these existed is disputed. The land bridges were gone by the time of the Late Pleistocene settlement of the Ryukyus around 32,000 years ago, requiring Paleolithic humans to have arrived at the islands via boats. Around 16,000 BCE, humans disappear from the archaeological record; they may have disappeared or been limited to the now-underwater coastline. Hunter-gatherer groups originating from Kyushu began to populate the northern and central Ryukyus around 5000 BCE, although recently discovered sites suggest possible initial dates around 12,000 to 7000. This repopulation began the Shellmound or Shellmidden Period.

Complex hunter-gatherer societies emerged during the mid-Shellmidden, but polities such as chiefdoms did not form. This is attributed to the low population sizes of the islands before the spread of agriculture. The Shellmidden people exploited plentiful shellfish and reef fish populations, hunted Ryukyu wild boar, and possibly tended domestic pigs. Although other East Asian populations adopted agriculture long before the beginning of the Common Era, no cereal cultivation occurred in the Ryuykus before c. 800 CE, with plant foods largely limited to nuts. Cultivation of taro or other root crops has been theorized, although without conclusive archaeological evidence. The lone unambiguously farmed crops from the Shellmidden are bottle gourd seeds recovered from the Ireibaru site on Okinawa. Archaeological samples have found evidence for a limited amount of farming from the 800s onward.

While theories of more significant pre-Gusuku agriculture have been put forward, this would require the population to have later abandoned their dependence on agriculture before the beginning of the Gusuku period. Cultivation remained very limited until a rapid expansion in the tenth to twelfth centuries, corresponding to an influx of migrants from Japan.

=== Chronology ===
Older sources use a later definition of the Gusuku Period, beginning c. 1200 CE and stretching well into the early Ryukyu Kingdom. However, following archaeological evidence for subsistence agriculture and greater social complexity prior to this date, 21st century sources have largely redefined the period as lasting from c. 1050 to c. 1429. This corresponds to the period of increased trade, societal shifts, and endemic warfare before the centralization of the kingdom of Chūzan and the unification of the Ryukyu Kingdom.

Within the Yaeyama Islands (or Sakishima more generally), (Note: Comprising the Miyako Islands and Yaeyama Islands, including Yonaguni) the period corresponding to the Gusuku is sometimes labeled the Suku Period, divided between the Shinzato Mura Period (12th–13th centuries) and the Nakamori Period (13th–17th centuries). Due to their proximity and trade links to Kyushu, the Ōsumi Islands largely follow corresponding archaeological periods in Japan, adopting rice and millet cultivation during the middle of the Yayoi Period (c. 1st century CE).

== Emergence ==
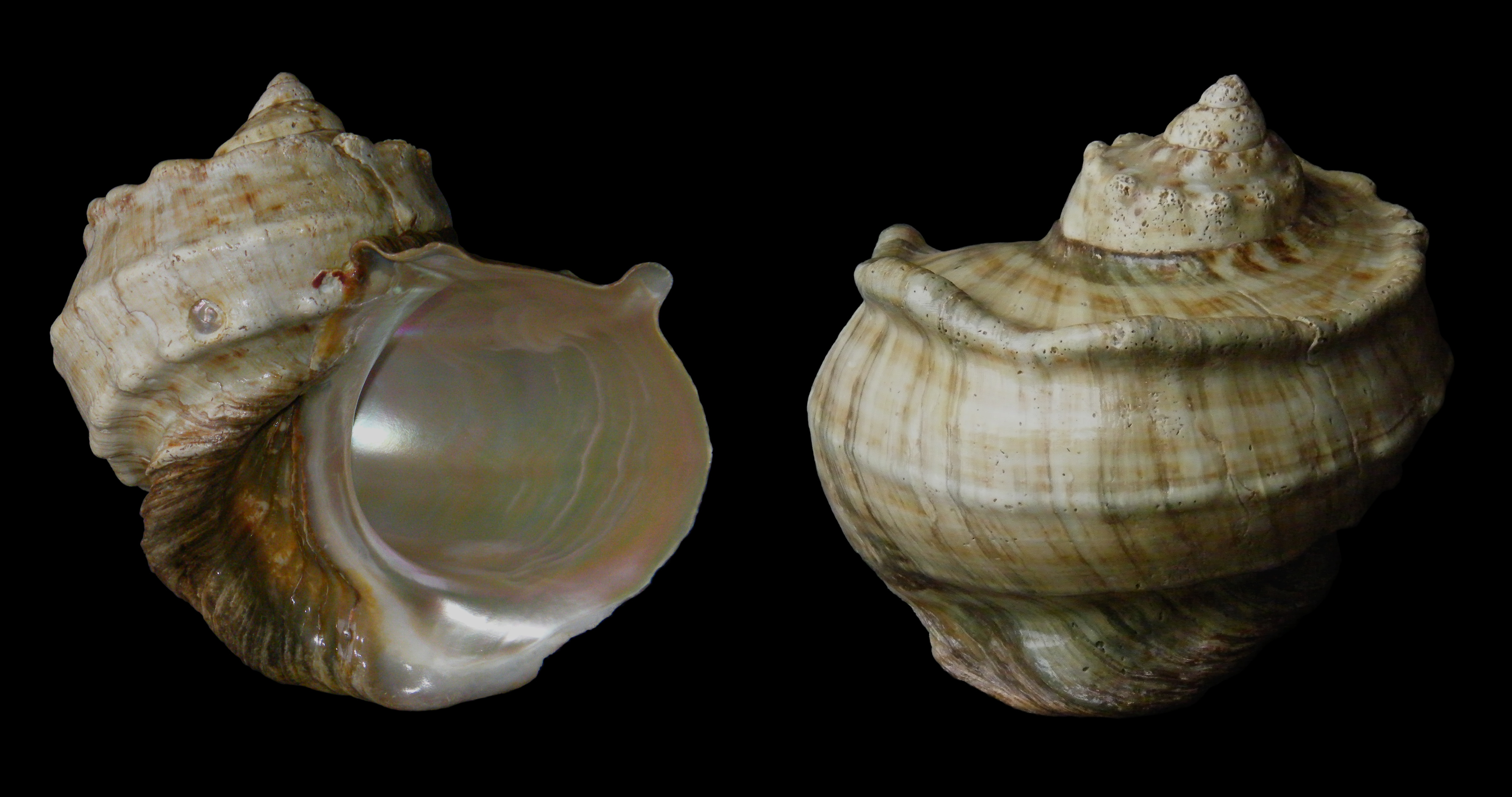
Shells of Turbo snails were prominent trade goods during the period.

Beginning around 300 BCE, the Shellmidden population saw a steady decline from its peak. Populations remained low across the 1st millennium CE. The islanders traded with Japan, but saw little cultural influence from it beyond pottery designs. During the 9th century, the Dazaifu (the regional Japanese government in Kyushu) established the Gusuku site (Note: Not to be confused with gusuku generally; the Gusuku site is a specific archaeology site on Kikaijima.) on the island of Kikai as a trading outpost. Exploiting the lucrative trade of turbo sea snail shells (a source of mother of pearl highly prized by artisans), Kikai became a major trading hub connected to the Japanese port of Hakata and the Korean kingdom of Goryeo. A small community of merchants from Goryeo settled on Kikai. Their settlement led to the creation of Kamuiyaki ware, a new form of stoneware with cultural influence from Korean ceramics. The Gusuku site became the center of a small state encompassing Kikai and portions of neighboring Amami.

Beginning in the 11th century, large numbers of agrarian Japonic-speaking peoples settled the Ryukyus, with Kikai as the origin of various successive migration waves across the archipelago. These migrations, while all originating on Kikai, spread progressively southward. The Amami Islands were the first to be fully settled, followed by the Okinawa Islands, the Miyako Islands, and finally the Yaeyama Islands. This migration was likely motivated by access to various trade goods found in the southern islands, highly coveted in Song China and by the aristocracy of Heian Japan.

=== Language and demography ===
The indigenous population of the Ryukyu Islands prior to the Gusuku Period was of the non-Japonic Jōmon ancestry, with little of the Yayoi genetics prevalent in mainland Japan. Interactions between this population and the Japonic newcomers varied across the archipelago. However, many Japonic communities formed cultural enclaves, evidenced by their material cultures coexisting for several centuries. In some cases, Japonic settlements were founded with practically no indigenous influence. Indigenous culture on the islands gradually assimilated, and vanished entirely by the 14th century.

Due to their shared set of innovations absent in Japanese, the modern Ryukyuan languages are generally thought to form one of the two or three main branches of Japonic, (Note: If including the Hachijō language of the Izu Islands as its own branch of the Japonic family) descended from a common Proto-Ryukyuan origin. They retain archaic features from Proto-Japonic that were lost in Old Japanese, suggesting a divergence date no later than the 7th century. However, Sino-Japanese vocabulary borrowed from Early Middle Japanese indicates that it maintained close contact with Japanese until the 8th or 9th century. This linguistic divergence long before the Gusuku Period suggests a pre-Proto-Ryukyuan (Note: "pre-Proto-Ryukyuan" is also called Proto-Kyushu-Ryukyuan in some sources.) homeland in southern Kyushu and the surrounding islands. Proto-Ryukyuan itself branched off from this earlier form within the Ryukyu Islands, possibly beginning on Kikai, and diversified as it spread across the archipelago.

Earlier, now-discredited, theories attribute the emergence of Proto-Ryukyuan to either the Japonic-speaking Hayato people settling the Ryukyus after the conquest of southern Kyushu by the Yamato state, or as an evolution from a trade pidgin on Kikai.

== Developments ==
=== Agriculture ===
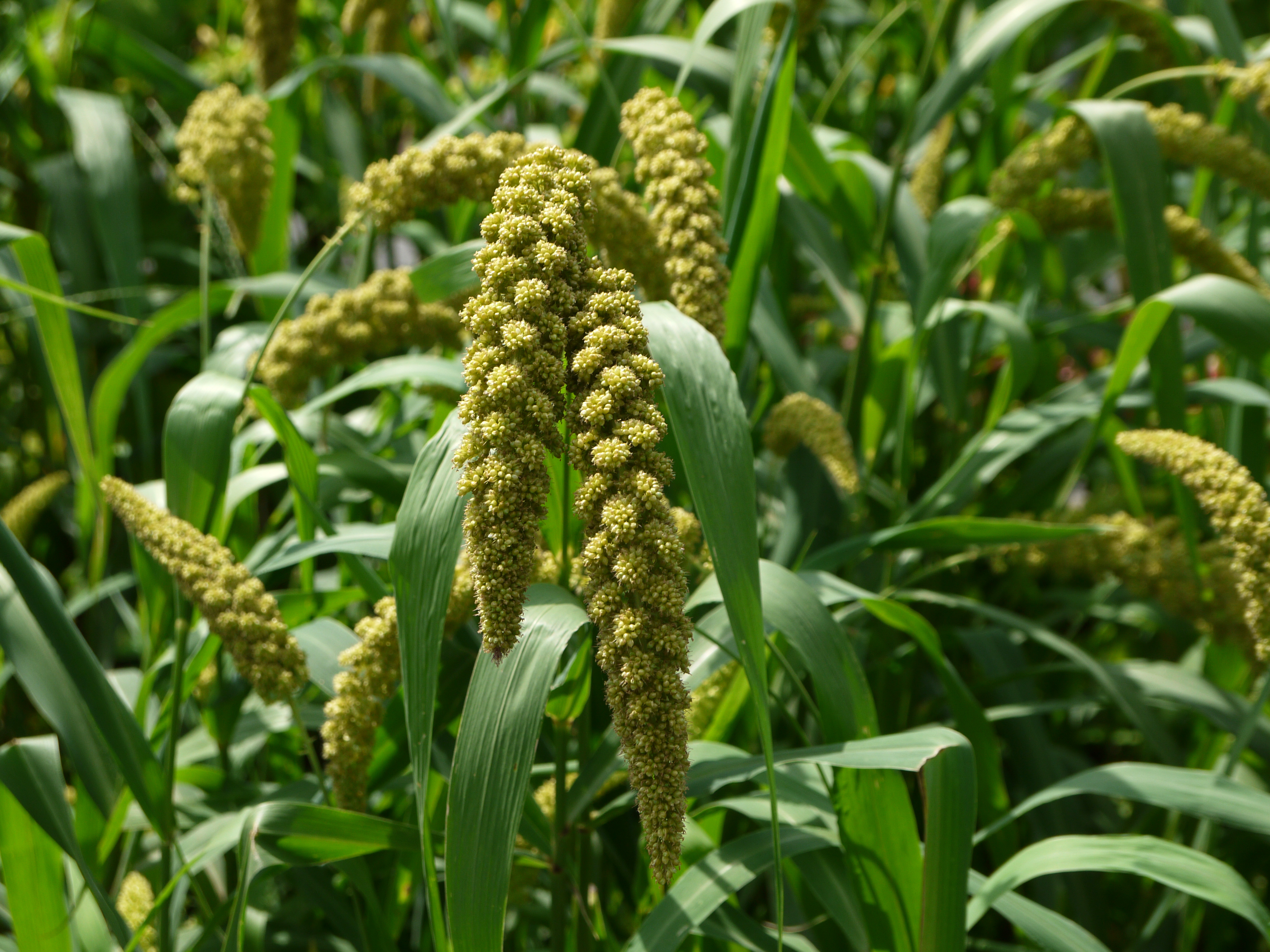
Foxtail millet was a common crop during the Gusuku period.

As the Shellmidden Period transitioned into the Gusuku, subsistence agriculture emerged. Agriculture likely took root in the Amami Islands in the 8th century, before spreading to the Okinawa Islands 100–200 years later. Rice and millet agriculture spread to Sakishima by the 12th century.

Cereal crops such as rice, barley, wheat, and foxtail millet have been found in Gusuku Period sites, alongside possibly beans. Sites in Southern Okinawa mainly grew millet and barley, while rice predominated in northern Okinawa and Amami. This rice was initially japonica rice, but tropical varieties were likely introduced later via trade with China and Southeast Asia. Initially in low-lying alluvial regions, farms gradually shifted to higher slopes. Wheat and barley were mainly grown through dryfield cultivation, with irrigation limited to the rice paddies. Cattle were used to cultivate both varieties of field. Archaeological examinations of Gusuku Period sites on Miyako Island have revealed similar crops to Okinawa and Amami. Foxtail millet composes the vast majority of finds at Miyako, alongside smaller amounts of Adzuki beans and broomcorn millet.

The centrality of agriculture to Gusuku Period society is a topic of academic contention. Historians and archaeologists have generally analyzed the Gusuku as a stratified agrarian society, attributing the formation of states and nobility to this agricultural base. Others have disputed this, suggesting that local agriculture was unlikely to produce a significant surplus, and instead attributing these developments to maritime trade.

=== Architecture ===
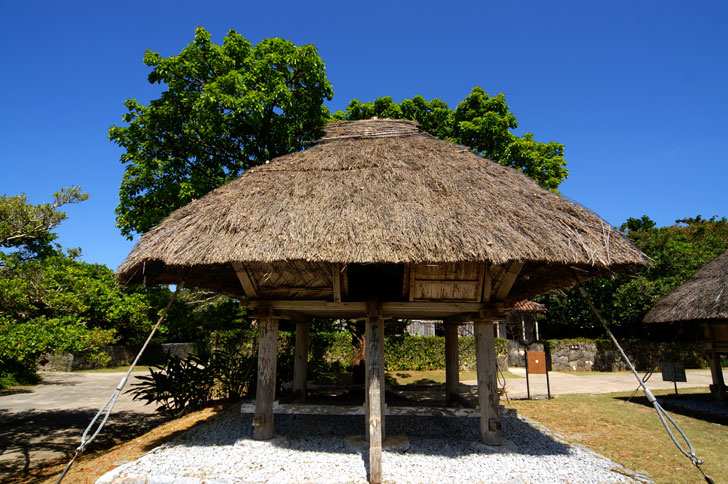
Reconstruction of an elevated storehouse at Ocean Expo Park, Okinawa

Shellmidden-era construction was largely limited to pit-houses. The larger settlements of the Gusuku saw the flourishing of vernacular architecture. Settlements during the 11th to 13th centuries typically comprised several elevated main houses raised on posts with diameters of 50 centimeters (1.6 ft) or more. Pillars within the house were typically spaced by a bay (ken) of roughly 1 metre (3.3 ft), significantly smaller than the ken spacings used in traditional Japanese architecture. Houses contained hearths, with the largest having two. Elevated storehouses (called takakura) were located 10–15 meters (30–50 ft) from the main structures, generally to the southwest to maximize sunlight. Some of these village sites include the remains of metalworking facilities, including pits for the storage of ironsand and hearths equipped with clay tuyeres.

==== Gusuku castles ====
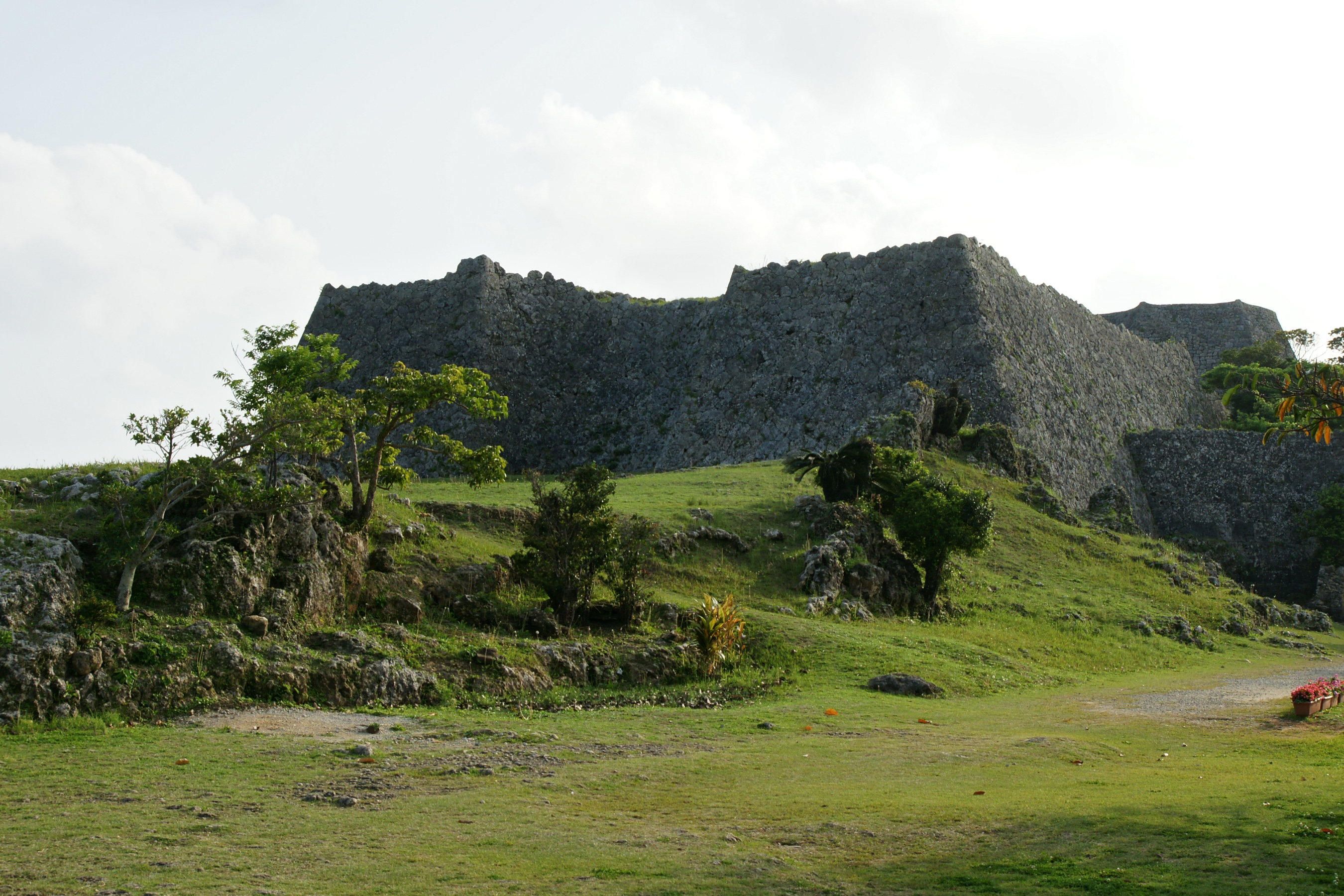
Nakagusuku, Okinawa

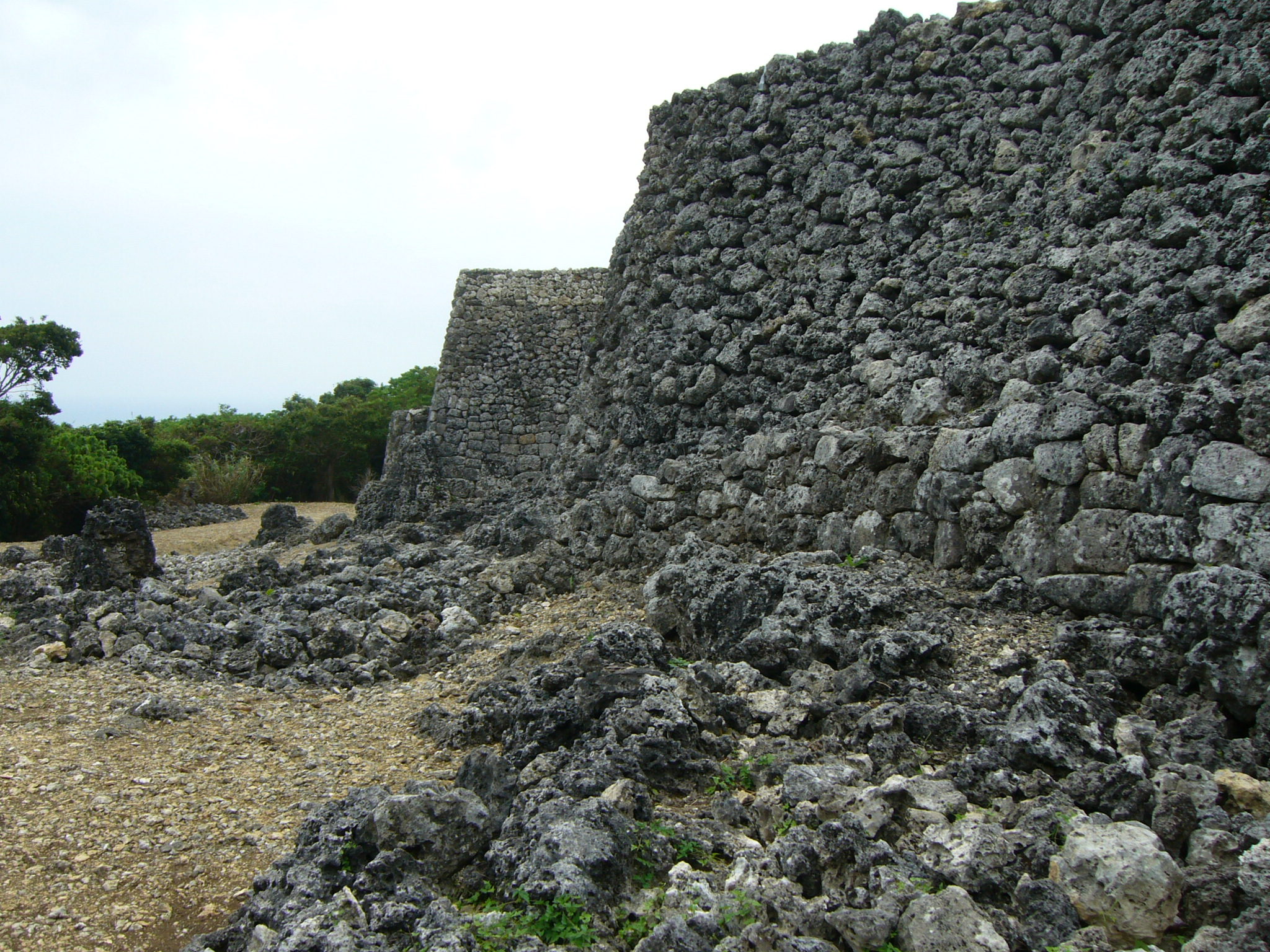
Itokazu Castle, Okinawa

In the 13th century, villages were often built in defensive positions surrounded by palisades. By the later portion of the century, some settlements were partially encircled by stone walls. These early fortifications enclosed residential areas of both commoners and elites, as well as some utaki shrines, with satellite villages outside their walls. During the 14th and 15th centuries, these fortifications evolved into the gusuku. The largest were massive stone fortresses enclosing elite residences, shrines, and work areas oriented around a central plaza. By the 15th century, there were approximately 100 gusuku on Okinawa, with some estimates putting the total around 200.

Stone-walled gusuku, found on the islands of Okinawa, Yoron, and Okinoerabu were likely inspired by Korean mountain fortresses. Many were built with coral limestone, although earthen construction is also attested in southern Okinawa. In the north of the island, where coral limestone was not available, ditches were dug across ridges for fortification. Many of the larger gusuku were likely built by slaves taken during pirate raids. They used Japanese and Korean-style roofing tiles, probably built by foreign tilesmiths who settled in the islands.

While many gusuku were permanent installations, some were occupied only during emergencies. They dramatically vary in size. Smaller gusuku measuring less than 2,000 m^{2} (0.5 acres) feature a single enclosure, while the much larger structures ranging from 1–2 hectares (2–5 acres) have multiple. Even larger gusuku exceeding 2 ha (5 acres) were built after the end of the Gusuku Period. Large amounts of military equipment, such as fragments of swords, armor, helmets, and arrowheads, have been recovered from gusuku sites. Firearms, in the form of Chinese hand cannons, were introduced to the islands during the fifteenth century. Some gusuku show damage from hand cannon fire.

Gusuku on Amami were built atop hills and mountains. They featured smaller enclosures and large ditches. They were built on "virtually every ridge and headland", protecting rivers and bays, often in direct line-of-sight of one another. Smaller enclosed fortifications were constructed in Sakishima, although some examples of stone-walled gusuku have been found.

=== Society and governance ===
A class of local nobility, the aji, began to emerge during the early Gusuku period. Local aji initially constructed small gusuku as a show of political power. As particular aji consolidated holdings and absorbed the territories of neighboring lords, the fortifications steadily grew in size and complexity. The most powerful nobles were referred to as aji-osoi ("leader of lords"). They commanded local armies, and held control over less powerful lords within their territories. Larger polities shared power between the ruler and various councilors. The strongholds of powerful rulers on Okinawa were named nekuni ("root country"). Centered on gusuku, these usually had access to great wealth and resources, were able to field armies, and ruled over or pacified a wide area. The most powerful gusuku centers on Okinawa were Katsuren, Nakagusuku, Sashiki, Hanagusuku, Urasoe, and Itokazu. In Sakishima, the island of Miyako was the preeminent base of political power.

=== Trade and foreign relations ===
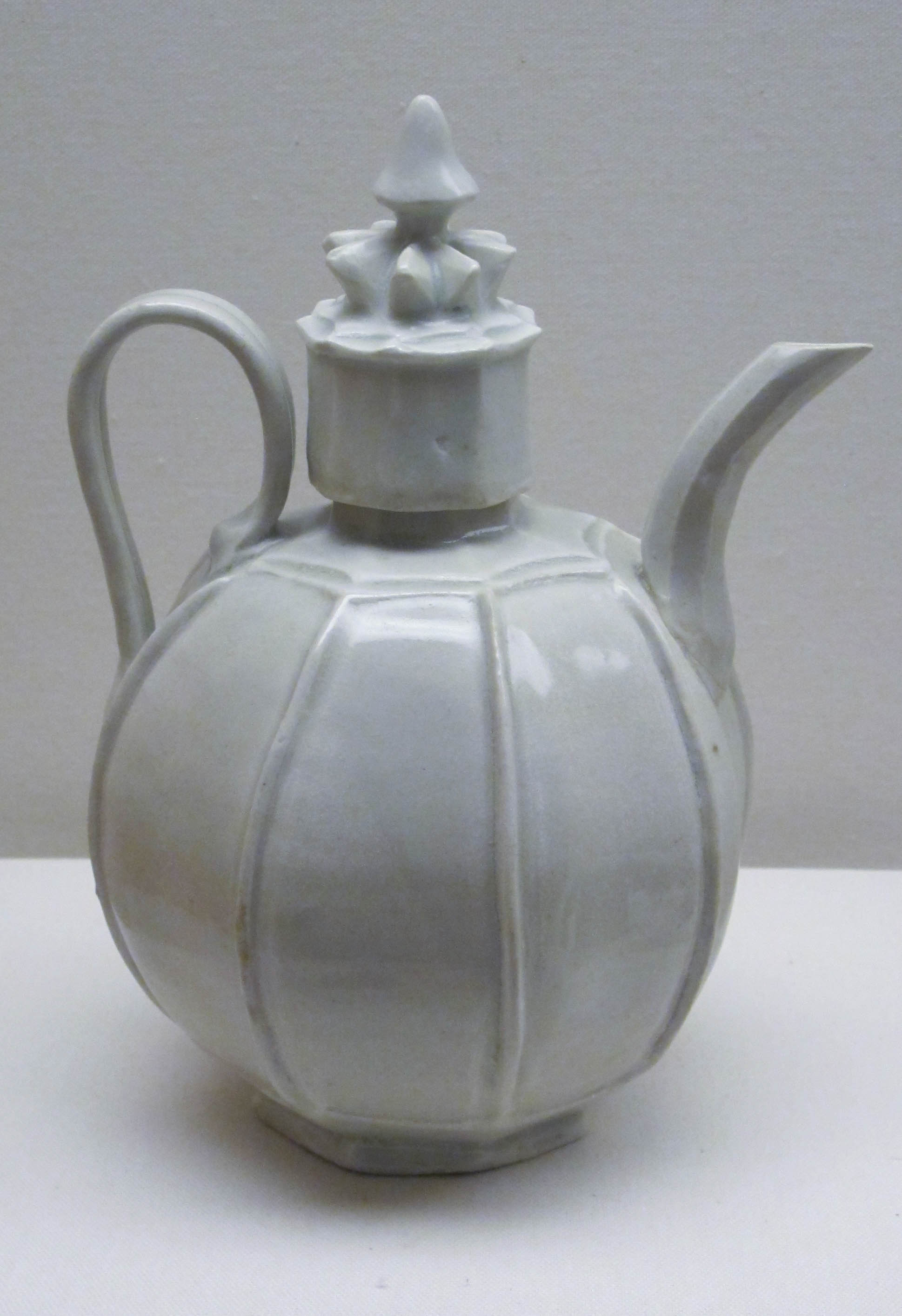
Song dynasty Qingbai ware was imported during the Gusuku Period.

Trade links between Kyushu and the central Ryukyus date to the Shellmidden Period, with shells as the primary export in exchange for Japanese pottery. The transition into the Gusuku Period saw trade expansion and the import of both Chinese ceramics and Japanese soapstone cauldrons from Kyushu, which were used in the Ryukyus alongside the locally-produced earthenware. The Gusuku people also imported iron knives and magatama beads from Japan. By the late 12th century, they began importing ceramics (such as Qingbai ware and celadon) directly from China, including forms of pottery not found in the main Japanese islands. By the 13th century, pottery imports shifted to Chinese Longquan celadon, with smaller amounts of Korean, Thai, and Vietnamese ceramics. In addition to the Japanese and Korean traders at Kikai, traders from the Song Empire became active in the Ryukyu Islands during the early Gusuku period.

During the late 14th century, tribute missions were sent by Okinawan lords to Ming China and Joseon Korea. Formal tribute relations with the Ming Empire commenced in 1372, with Okinawan lords sending regular emissaries with tribute goods to the imperial court (alongside token recognition of Ming suzerainty) every three years, in exchange for trade rights with the Chinese. The establishment of formal tribute status resulted in a much greater volume of trade between the Ryukyus and China. During the rule of Ashikaga Yoshimitsu (1368–1394) the Ashikaga shogunate (the military government of Japan) established the Ryūkyū Bugyō office to manage trade with Ryukyuan merchants. The Ryukyus also had intermittent trade connections with Southeast Asia. While merchants from Miyako and other islands in Sakishima sailed directly to Southeast Asia, rulers in Okinawa hired Chinese ships and crews to travel to the region.

==== Piracy ====
The Ryukyus were major bases for pirates, known regionally as the wokou, from the late 13th century to the end of the Gusuku Period. Many pirates were aligned with the Japanese Southern Court during the civil war against the Northern Court during the Nanboku-chō Period (1336–1392). These pirates had major bases on Kyushu and Tsushima. Following the collapse of the Southern Court in the 1380s and 1390s, pirates from Kyushu migrated to the Ryukyus, outside of the reach of the victorious Ashikaga shogunate. Naha (on Okinawa) served as the primary port of the Ryukyus and became a major center of piracy and slave trading during the 15th century.

== Emergence of the Ryukyu Kingdom ==
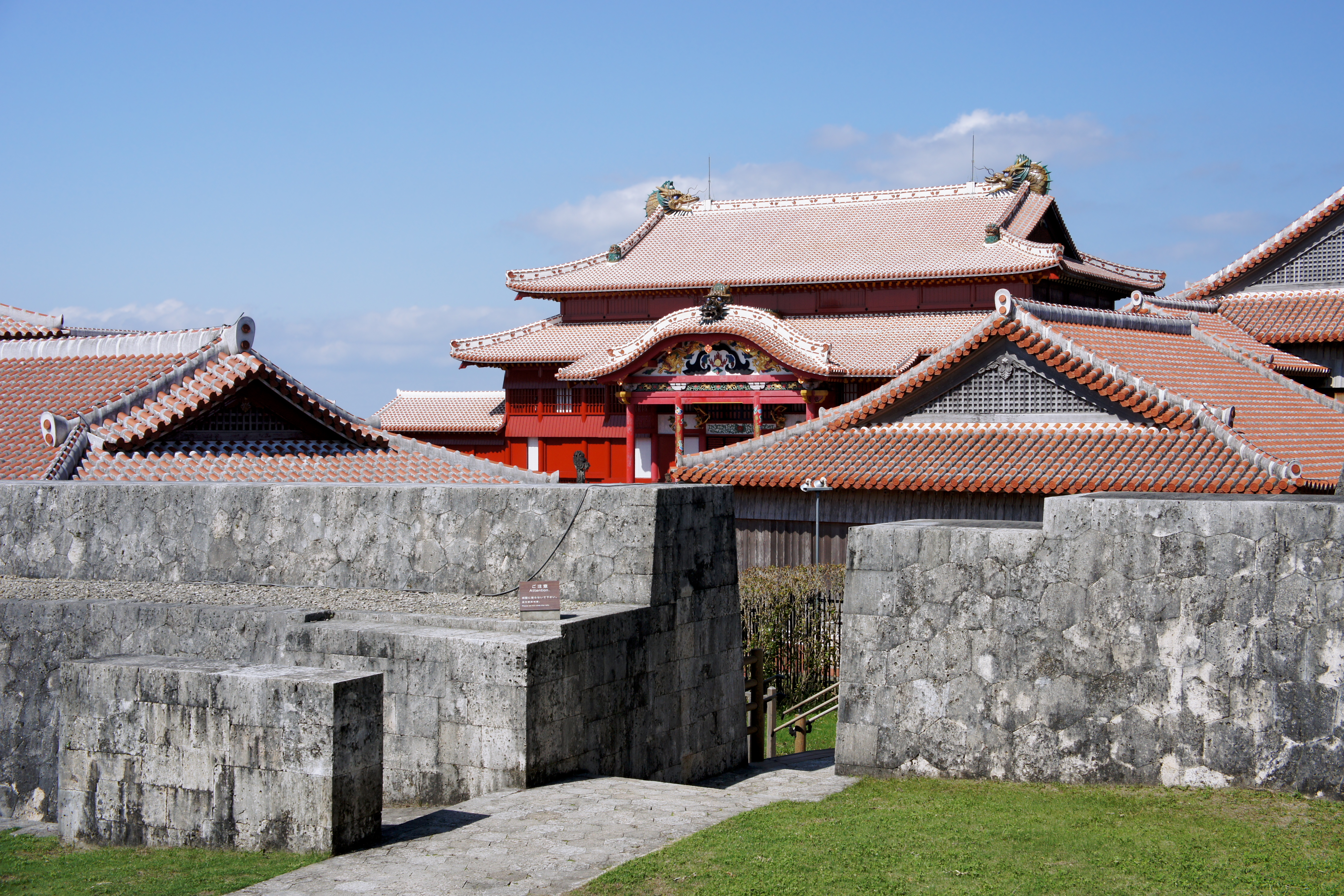
Shuri Castle, a gusuku which served as the capital of the Ryukyu Kingdom

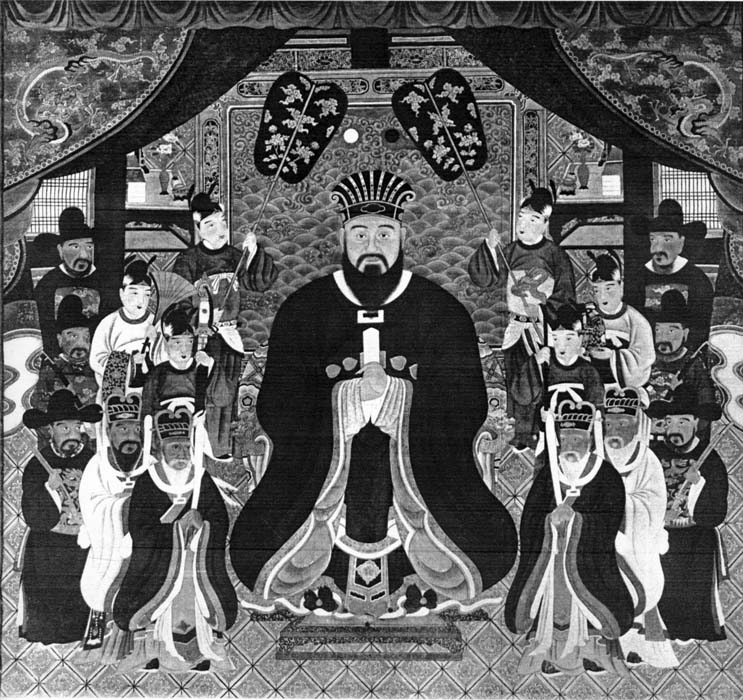
18th century depiction of Shō Shin and attendants by Shō Genko

Both contemporary Ming dynasty tribute records and later Ryukyuan official histories state that Okinawa was divided into three kingdoms, collectively termed the Sanzan, during the 14th and early 15th centuries: Sanhoku in the north, Chūzan in the center, and Sannan in the south. These polities may have functioned as loose confederations of nobles, with their kings as leaders. As each king was entitled to his own profitable trade arrangements with the Ming, local nobility would have strong incentives to present themselves as kings. They may not have corresponded to territorial control on the island, instead serving as labels which various powerful lords operated under during diplomatic and trade relations with the Ming.

By 1429, Okinawa's tribute relations with the Ming became the domain of a single ruler, Shō Hashi of Chūzan. Possibly the grandson of a pirate from Kyushu, Hashi likely took the throne from king Bunei with the aid of Chinese officials. Hashi was a powerful military leader, although he probably lacked political control over all of Okinawa. The various other kings of Chūzan succeed him as the sole tribute king of Okinawa, forming the First Shō dynasty with its base at Shuri Castle. After his death, the kingdom went through a rapid series of rulers, often marked by succession crises and wars. The kings of the First Shō dynasty may not have been linked as a bloodline or family. During this period, the southern Ryukyu Islands were ruled by a series of local warlords with some trade connections to Shuri and the Shō dynasty.

In 1453, Shō Taikyū became the ruler of Shuri and Chūzan. Before his death in 1460, he conquered Katsuren Castle, promoted Zen Buddhism, minted coins, and took full control of trade with Korea. Taikyū launched military expeditions to the northern islands, but failed to achieve political hegemony over Okinawa. Shō Toku took the throne after his death, beginning an eight-year rule described as despotic by the Ryukyuan official histories.

Shō En became king in 1470, possibly due to a coup d'état, and founded the Second Shō dynasty. His son Shō Shin (r. 1477–1526) oversaw the centralization of the Ryukyu Kingdom at Shuri and the subjugation of the outlying islands of the archipelago, such as Yaeyama. Lords were forced to live at Shuri, with agents titled aji-uttchi assigned to administrate the holdings in their place. This practice destroyed the last elements of Gusuku Period local governance.

== Historiography ==
=== Extant sources ===
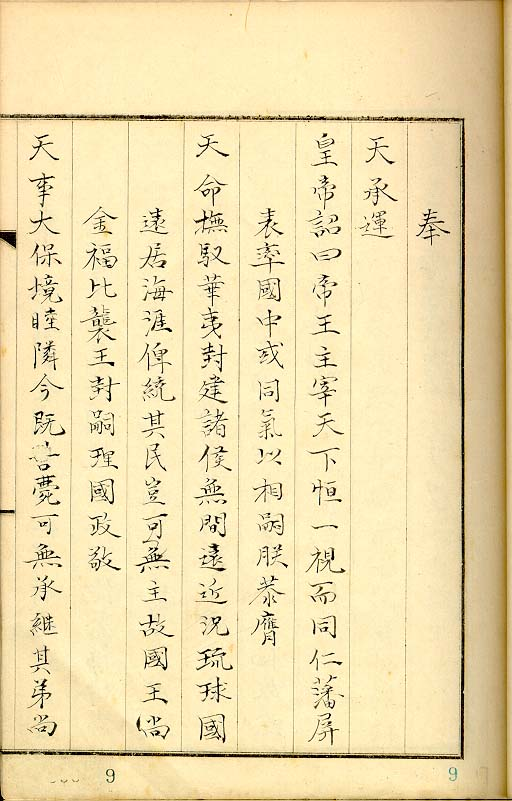
A page from the Rekidai Hōan, which records diplomatic and trade information from 1424 onward

Extremely few written documents date to the Gusuku Period, with primary sources limited to foreign diplomatic and tribute records during the latest portion of the period, such as the Ming Veritable Records and the Veritable Records of the Joseon Dynasty. A compilation of diplomatic and trade records, the Rekidai Hōan (''Precious Documents of Successive Generations''), began in 1424, around the end of the period; it was initially compiled by Chinese merchants and trade officials in Okinawa. Early royal inscriptions are found on the stele Ankokuzan Jukaboku no Kihi (commissioned by Shō Hashi in 1427) and the bronze bell Bankoku Shinryō no Kane (commissioned by Shō Taikyū in 1458).

The first official or state history of Ryukyu, the Chūzan Seikan ("Reflections on Chūzan") was published by Shō Shōken in 1650, long after the end of the Gusuku Period. It was mainly based on interviews with elderly officials. Later state histories include the two early-18th century editions of the Chūzan Seifu ("Genealogy of Chūzan") and the mid-18th century Kyūyō (''Beautiful Ryukyu''). Largely based on Confucian historiography and principles, it is not possible to corroborate most information from the official sources dating to periods before the 16th and 17th centuries. The Omoro Sōshi is a compilation of Ryukyuan chants or songs, comprising 22 volumes and 1,553 songs, with the earliest volumes compiled during the early 1530s. Difficult to decipher and understand, the Omoro at times disagrees with the official histories. However, both the official histories and the Omoro are biased towards Shō Shin and the Shuri area in their retelling, as well as towards Okinawa in general.

==== Traditional historiography ====
The official histories state that a sage king of divine ancestry, Tenson, was the first king of Okinawa and the founder of a holy dynasty which would rule for 17,000 years. Shunten, the son of the exiled samurai Minamoto no Tametomo, defeated the usurper Riyū around 1187 and began his own dynasty. A severe lack of written documentation before the 17th century limits the understanding of state and religion during the period. Shunten was almost certainly fictional, but may reflect the relocation of trading infrastructure to Okinawa after the 1188 invasion of Kikai. His depiction may have been inspired by the legendary Chinese Emperor Shun. Eiso is described as displacing Shunten's dynasty and ruling from 1260 to 1299. He is the earliest named ruler to appear in the Omoro. Although traditionally depicted as the king of a unified Okinawa, he was likely a regional warlord in Urasoe. The official histories describe a unified Okinawa splitting into the three kingdoms around 1320, during the reign of King Tamagusuku. They differ on the date of the reunification of the island by Shō Hashi, placing it either in 1422 or 1429. Due to this early date for unification, what the official histories depict as internal rebellions over the following decades may have been wars between Chuzan and neighboring polities.

=== Modern historiography ===
Zenchū Nakahara, writing in the 1950s, was among the first historians to identify the major cultural discontinuity between the Gusuku Period and earlier stages of Ryukyuan prehistory. Highly skeptical of the Ryukyuan official histories that formed the basis of prior historians' work, he based much of his research off the Omoro and the limited archaeological knowledge available at his time, focusing on the emergence of the aji, migrations from Japan, and endemic warfare in the twelfth century. Nakahara wrote that Shō Hashi and the First Shō Dynasty ruled Okinawa in name only, with a unified feudal society emerging only under the Second Shō. Other contemporary historians, such as Inamura Kenpu and Higa Shunchō, also identified the Gusuku as a distinct period, viewing it as a social and political transformation of an existing Japonic culture in Ryukyu analogous to Japan's earlier development.

The centrality of Japan to development in the Ryukyus was challenged in the 1980s and 1990s in favor of a mainly domestic origin, with historians such as Takara Kurayoshi and Murai Shōsuke emphasizing the independent emergence of a complex political order on Okinawa from agricultural surplus during the Gusuku Period, often placing more credence into the official histories. This in turn has been challenged by other historians who emphasize the importance of trade, with the Gusuku Period representing a sudden and dramatic break from earlier periods, as the large-scale migrations of Japonic peoples early in the period led to a significantly greater connection with maritime trade routes.
