= Kyūyō =

Official history of the Ryūkyū Kingdom

The Kyūyō-kiji (球陽記事, Okinawan:Chūyō chiji), generally abridged in Kyūyō (球陽, Okinawan:Chūyō) is an official history of the Ryūkyū Kingdom, compiled by a group of historians led by Tei Heitetsu Kohagura Uēkata Yūjitsu (鄭秉哲 古波蔵親方祐實) between year 8 of the Qianlong era (1743) and year 10 of the same era (1745), at the request of king Shō Kei. It includes a “central” (本巻) part (twenty-two main volumes and four appendix volumes) and an “external” (外巻) part (three main volumes and one appendix volume).

== Title ==
The name kyūyō is composed of two ideograms, the first, 球, corresponds to the “kyū” of Ryūkyū and the second, 陽, corresponds to the Chinese philosophic principle of yang, linked to light. It is a poetic way of naming Ryūkyū.

In Japan, the same type of poetic name is used to evoke Nagasaki (Kiyō (崎陽)) or Satsuma (Satsuyō (薩陽)). It seems this habit appeared in Japan by the 1770s in order to evoke Chinese-sounding names, many Chinese cities having the suffix 陽 in their name

The abridged name of “Kyūyō” has mainly spread after the fall of the Ryūkyū Kingdom. The original name of the book is “Kyūyō-kiji”, then abridged in “Kiji”. Kyūyō-kiji literally means “the articles of Ryūkyū”.

The “external” part of the Kyūyō is sometimes considered as an independent book and is known under the name of Irōsetsuden (遺老説伝).

== Edition ==
=== Dates ===
The redaction of the Kyūyō started in year 8 of the Qianlong era (1743) at the request of king Shō Kei, under the direction of Tei Heitetsu Kohagura Uēkata Yūjitsu, a bureaucrat from Kuninda, and was finished in year 10 of the same era (1745). The Kyūyō then counted fourteen volumes but the bureaucrats-historians (史官) of the Ministry of Genealogies (系図座) completed it regularly until year 5 of the Guangxu era (1879). Part of the original text has been lost.

It is possible that the “external” part of the Kyūyō, the Irōsetsuden, was written beforehand, at the beginning of the 18th century, at the same time as the Ryūkyū-koku yurai-ki.

The preface of the Kyūyō gives a list of the persons involved in its redaction:

Sanshikan

- Sai On Gushichan Uēkata Bunjaku (蔡溫 具志頭親方文若)
- Shō Kentoku Nakijin Uēkata Chōken (向儉德 (倹徳) 今歸仁親方朝見), will later become Fukuyama Uēkata (向儉德 譜久山親方朝見)
- Shō Tokukō Ginowan Uēkata Chōga (向得功 宜野灣親方朝雅)

General supervisors

- Shō Bunshi Motobu Wōji Chōryū (尚文思 本部王子朝隆)
- Shō Yiren Ufugusuku Aji Chōki (向依仁 大城按司朝倚), will later become Ie Wōji (向依仁 伊江王子朝倚)
- Shō Heiken Kunigami Uēkata Chōsei (向秉乾 國頭親方朝齊)

Editors

- Tei Heitetsu Isagawa Uēkata Yūjitsu (鄭秉哲 伊差川親方祐實), will later become Kohagura Uēkata (鄭秉哲 古波蔵親方祐實)
- Sai Kōbo Kudaka Satonushi Pēchin Katsujō (蔡宏謨 久高里之子親雲上克定)
- Ryō Kō Tōma Pēchin Shimei (梁煌 當間親雲上子明)
- Mō Jōhō Wauke Satonushi Pēchin (毛如苞 和宇慶里之子親雲上)

After the first edition of 1745, the articles are written by the Ministry of Genealogies (系図座), that employed bureaucrats-historians who had been to China.

=== Editorial choices ===
Whereas most of the official documents of the Ryūkyū Kingdom make use of Chinese era names (with the few exceptions of the ones addressed to the Satsuma Domain, that use Japanese era names), the Kyūyō is the only document to use a chronology based on the reigns of the kings of Ryūkyū.

It is integrally written in traditional Chinese characters.

It should be mentioned that arbitrary dates have been added to some events, some articles that were distinct in the sources have been merged, some others have been reinterpreted and can be different from the source from which they are extracted.

=== Sources ===
The redaction of the Kyūyō is based on previous official histories that have been published by the Ryūkyū Kingdom, namely the Chūzan Seifu, the Ryūkyū-koku yurai-ki and the Ryūkyū-koku kyū-ki, but also on many other “chronicles of the origins” (由来記) and “ancient chronicles” (旧記) of the different magiris and islands of the kingdom, on the Ryūkyū-koku himon-ki (琉球国碑文記; Records of the inscriptions of the steles of Ryūkyū) or the Haneji-shioki (羽地仕置; Sentences of Haneji).

After the original edition by Tei Heitetsu Kohagura Uēkata Yūjitsu's team, as the redaction is entrusted to the ministry of genealogies, extracts from articles from administrative documents were added as well.

After the second half of the 18th century, each magiri and island has to record all natural disasters, climatic anomalies or favourable climatic conditions and to send each year a report to the Ministry of Dissensions (大与座, Ōkumiza). It seems this order was specifically given in order to ease the redaction of the Kyūyō.

== Contents ==
The Kyūyō is an official history of the Ryūkyū Kingdom listing the events chronologically for the reign of each king. It covers a period going from the foundation myths of the kingdom to the end of the 19th century (1876).

It includes a “central” part (twenty-two main volumes and four appendix volumes) and an “external” part (three main volumes and one appendix volume). The “external” part is known under the name of Irōsetsuden.

The appendix volumes gather articles concerning the Satsuma domain or Japan, and the Irōsetsuden gathers the legendary events that do not have a precise date.

The Kyūyō reports the incidents and events of the kingdom, insisting on politics for each king. Among the official histories of the Ryūkyū Kingdom, it is the most detailed and precise. The book has a universal vocation and records any event, would they be political, economical, social or cultural, without making any distinction between events occurring in the capital city or in the peripheral magiris and islands, the nobility or the common people. In addition to the governmental politics, economy, culture and international relations, the Kyūyō also reports the creation or disappearance of magiris and villages, stories about commendable actions or natural phenomenons. It is an historical document of an exceptional quality, not only for historical studies, but also for ethnography or the study of local legends.

=== Volumes of the current version ===
The content of each of the currently preserved volumes is as follow:

Central volumes

- Main volumes
  - Vol. 1 – Tenson dynasty, king Shunten, king Shunbajunki, king Gihon, king Eiso, king Taisei, king Eiji, king Tamagusuku, king Seii, king Satto, king Bunei
  - Vol. 2 – King Shō Shishō, king Shō Hashi, king Shō Chū, king Shō Shitatsu, king Shō Kinpuku, king Shō Taikyū, king Shō Toku
  - Vol. 3 – King Shō En, king Shō Sen'i, king Shō Shin
  - Vol. 4 – King Shō Sei, king Shō Gen, king Shō Ei, king Shō Nei
  - Vol. 5 – King Shō Hō, king Shō Ken
  - Vol. 6 – King Shō Shitsu
  - Vol. 7 – King Shō Tei (1) until year 14 of his reign
  - Vol. 8 – King Shō Tei (2) from year 15 to year 29 of his reign
  - Vol. 9 – King Shō Tei (3) from year 30 to year 41 of his reign, king Shō Eki
  - Vol. 10 – King Shō Kei (1) until year 8 of his reign
  - Vol. 11 – King Shō Kei (2) from year 9 to year 16 of his reign
  - Vol. 12 – King Shō Kei (3) from year 17 to year 20 of his reign
  - Vol. 13 – King Shō Kei (4) from year 21 to year 30 of his reign
  - Vol. 14 – King Shō Kei (5) from year 31 to year 32 of his reign
  - Vol. 15 – King Shō Boku (1) until year 19 of his reign
  - Vol. 16 – King Shō Boku (2) from year 20 to year 32 of his reign
  - Vol. 17 – King Shō Boku (3) from year 32 to year 40 of his reign
  - Vol. 18 – King Shō Boku (4) from year 39 to year 43 of his reign
  - Vol. 19 – King Shō On (complete reign) 8 years of reign, king Shō Sei 1 year of reign
  - Vol. 20 – King Shō Kō (complete reign) 31 years of reign
  - Vol. 21 – King Shō Iku (1) until year 10 of his reign (Note: In the version of the library of the University of Tsukuba, the reign of Shō Iku is integrally related in Volume 21, in the version of the Library of the Cabinet of the National Archives of Japan, it is related in two volumes, 21 and 22)
  - Vol. 22 – King Shō Iku (2) from year 10 to year 13 of his reign
  - Vol. 23 – King Shō Tai (1) until year 10 of his reign (Note: In the version of the library of the University of Tsukuba, the reign of Shō Tai is integrally related in one volume, Volume 22, in the version of the Library of the Cabinet of the National Archives of Japan, it is related in two volumes, 23 and 24)
  - Vol. 24 – King Shō Tai (2) from year 11 to year 29 of his reign
- Appendix of the central volumes
  - Appendix Vol. 1 – King Shō Nei, king Shō Hō, king Shō Ken, king Shō Shitsu
  - Appendix Vol. 2 – King Shō Tei, king Shō Eki (Note: In the version of the University of Tsukuba, volume 1 and 2 are united in one volume)
  - Appendix Vol. 3 – King Shō Kei, king Shō Boku, king Shō On, king Shō Kō, king Shō Iku
  - Appendix s.n. – King Shō Tai (Note: In the version of the university of Tsukuba, volumes 3 and s.n. are united in one volume, Volume 2)

External volumes

- External volume 1 – Irōsetsuden
- External volume 2 – Irōsetsuden
- External volume 3 – Irōsetsuden
- Appendix of the external volumes – Irōsetsuden

== Preserved copies ==
- twelve volumes are kept at the Library of the Cabinet of the National Archives of Japan (国立公文書館内閣文庫) under the reference 178-398. According to the notes at the end of the text, it is a copy of the book belonging to the Shō family that had been borrowed by Ba Kensai Yonabaru Uēkata Ryōketsu (馬兼才 與那原親方良傑) and transcribed in 1885 by Manjirō Ada, an employee of the Records Office of the Japanese Ministry of Foreign Affairs. The handwriting is clear and clean, but the records concerning the diplomatic relations between Ryūkyū and Japan were heavily censored. The records of this copy stop at year 23 of the reign of king Shō Tai (1870).
- thirteen volumes are kept at the Library of the Cabinet of the National Archives of Japan under the reference 178-381. It is the same version as one of the aforementioned twelve volumes.
- twenty-two volumes kept in the storeroom of the library of the University of Tsukuba. The handwriting is less neat in this version. It is more complete and includes records until the annexation by Japan in 1879.

There are several copies kept at the University of the Ryukyus (two copies from the Iha Fuyū Fund, including one called the “book of Miyazato” and one from the Miyara Dunchi Fund) and in Okinawa Prefectural Library (from the Higashionna Kanjun Fund, named the “book of Goeku”).

The integrality of the conserved text of the main volumes of the Kyūyō has been published by the Yumani Editions in two volumes in 2023 and 2024.

The integrality of the text of the external volumes (Irōsetsuden) has been published by the Bensei Editions in 2024.

== See also ==
- List of Cultural Properties of Japan - writings (Okinawa)
