= Eiso dynasty =

Third dynasty of Okinawa Island

The Eiso dynasty (英祖王統) was the third dynasty in the traditional historiography of Okinawa Island. It was established by Eiso in 1259. Chūzan Seikan, the first official history of the Ryūkyū Kingdom, claimed that Eiso was a descendant of the ancient Tenson dynasty. During Gihon's reign, Okinawa suffered from several terrible disasters, including storm, flood and famine. Around 1254, Gihon appointed Eiso to be regent (sessei). Seven years later, Gihon abdicated in favor of Eiso, whom established the Eiso dynasty in the same year. Gihon had to hand over his power because he was unable to manage these disasters and that discontent made it necessary to share authority with a representative chosen from the old Tenson chieftains; or a rival from Tenson chieftains forced Gihon to relinquish power. Though commonly called the "kings", the Okinawan rulers at that time should be more accurately identified as paramount chiefs, or overlords among aji during the Gusuku period.

George H. Kerr suggested that the stories of Shunten and Eiso dynasties "reflect the increasing penetration of Japanese influence" among Ryukyu Islands.

The Eiso dynasty had five kings, lasted from 1259 to 1349. When the fourth ruler Tamagusuku ascended the throne in 1314, the Okinawa Island fell into confusion and split into three principalities: Chūzan, Nanzan and Hokuzan. The lord (aji) of Ōzato left for his own castle and declared himself to be King of Nanzan, while the lord of Nakijin declared himself independent of Chūzan and crowned himself as the King of Hokuzan. On the death of the last king Seii in 1349, the last king of Eiso dynasty died. Satto, the Governor of Urasoe, seized the throne for himself and established the Satto dynasty.

== List of rulers ==
Name	Kanji	Divine name	Reign	Age at death
Eiso	英祖	Wezo-no-tedako 英祖日子	1260–1299	70
Taisei	大成	Unknown	1300–1308	9 or 61
Eiji	英慈	Unknown	1309–1313	45
Tamagusuku	玉城	Unknown	1314–1336	40
Seii	西威	Unknown	1337–1354	21
