= Eiso =

Eiso may refer to:

- Eiso (era) (988–990), one of Emperor Ichijō's eras
- Eiso (king) (1229–1299), semi-legendary ruler of Okinawa Island
- Eiso dynasty (1259–1349), a dynasty on Okinawa Island founded by Eiso
