= Chūzan =

Kingdom from 1314 to 1429 on the island of Okinawa, now part of Japan

Coordinates: 26°14′48″N 127°43′55″E

Kingdom of Chūzan 中山
- 1314–1429
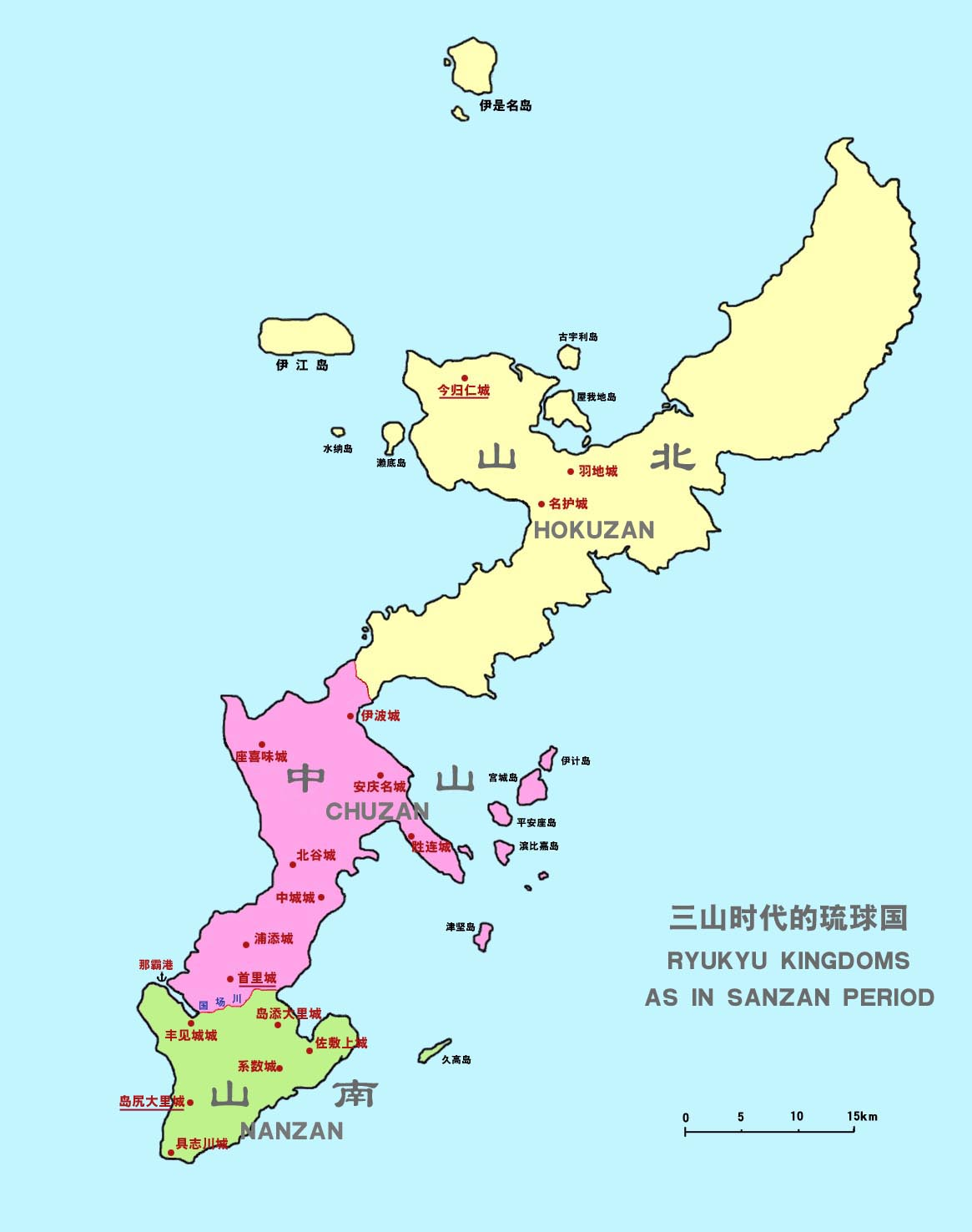
- Map of the Three Kingdoms (Sanzan) of Okinawa, with Chūzan the central portion in purple
- Capital: Urasoe
- Common languages: Ryukyuan, Chinese
- Religion: Ryukyuan religion
- Government: Monarchy
- King (国王)
  - 1314–1336: Tamagusuku
  - 1355–1397: Satto
  - 1398–1406: Bunei
  - 1422–1429: Shō Hashi
- History
  - Established: 1314
  - Ryukyuan unification: 1429
  - Japanese invasion: 5 April 1609
Preceded by	Succeeded by
Lordship of Urasoe	Ryukyu Kingdom

Chūzan (中山, Okinawan: Chūzan) was one of three kingdoms which controlled Okinawa in the 14th century. Okinawa, previously controlled by a number of local chieftains or lords, loosely bound by a paramount chieftain or king of the entire island, split into these three more solidly defined kingdoms within a few years after 1314; the Sanzan period thus began, and would end roughly one hundred years later, when Chūzan's King Shō Hashi conquered Hokuzan in 1419 and Nanzan in 1429.

The united Okinawan state was called the Ryūkyū Kingdom, but would continue to be referred to as "Chūzan" in various official documents of the Ryukyuan royal government, and those of many other states in the region.

== History ==
Tamagusuku succeeded his father Eiji as king of Okinawa at the age of nineteen, in 1314. However, he lacked the charisma or leadership abilities to command the respect and loyalty of the various territorial lords (aji), and many rebelled soon afterwards. The Lord of Ozato fled south and, along with his followers, formed the kingdom of Nanzan (南山, Southern Mountain), while the Lord of Nakijin, based some distance to the north, declared himself king of Hokuzan (北山, Northern Mountain). Thus, Tamagusuku, in Urasoe, became king of Chūzan.

Tamagusuku died in 1336, and was succeeded by his son Seii, then ten years of age. Seii's reign was relatively short, and defined by the interference and political abuses of his mother which led to an erosion of what little support the young king may have had from the territorial lords. The three "kingdoms" were little different from the loosely unified chiefdoms which came before, and the "kings" did not wield considerably greater power, nor were their administrations more organized or more politically stable than what came before. However, this became gradually less true over the generations; the king's power and organization advanced considerably by the time all three kingdoms were unified as the Kingdom of Ryukyu.

Seii was overthrown by the lord of Urasoe around 1349–1355; the reign of the new king, Satto, marked the emergence of Chūzan as a small but not insignificant player in regional trade and politics. A number of domestic policies and foreign relations begun at this time would continue until the end of the kingdom five hundred years later. Satto established diplomatic and trade relations with a number of states in the region, including the Ayutthaya Kingdom of Thailand and Joseon Dynasty of Korea, and saw the beginnings of Ryukyu's role in a flourishing system of regional trade. The first Ming dynasty envoys arrived in Okinawa in 1372, marking the beginning of tributary relations with China. From then on, Chūzan (and unified Ryukyu later) would send frequent tribute missions, and would rely upon the Chinese court to officially recognize each successive Ryukyuan king with a formal statement of investiture. China would have an incredibly strong influence on Ryukyu for the next five hundred years, politically, economically, and culturally, as it did with its numerous other tributary states.

This period also saw the beginnings of a bureaucracy in the royal government which would later grow to rule in the king's place and in his name, replacing direct monarchical rule. Kumemura, a community for Chinese immigrants was established; the Chinese living here, and their Ryukyuan descendants, would serve Chūzan (and later the unified kingdom) as diplomats, interpreters, and government officials. Kumemura quickly grew into Ryukyu's cultural capital, something of a complement to the political capital at Shuri and the commercial center at the port of Naha. A community for Ryukyuan envoys and scholars was similarly established in Fukien in China, and the first Ryukyuans to study in China's capital did so at this time as well, again establishing precedents for developments which would continue for centuries.

Satto's son Bunei succeeded him in 1395, and oversaw the continuation of the policies and developments of his father's reign. Relations with China grew stronger, and a number of institutions were established to cater to Chinese envoys to Chūzan. Trade boomed, and relations with other countries likewise continued to be expanded. Though China accepted tributary missions from Hokuzan and Nanzan as well at this time, they officially recognized only the King of Chūzan as a head of state in Ryukyu. Chūzan continued to enjoy formal diplomatic relations with Ayutthaya and Korea, and trade relations with Java, Sumatra, and other states, as did the other two Ryukyuan kingdoms. However, only Chūzan managed to establish formal relations with Japan's Ashikaga shogunate, having sent a mission in 1403. These political advantages, coupled with control of Naha, the most active port on Okinawa, allowed Chūzan to gain significant political and economic superiority over its two neighbors. It also benefited greatly culturally; trade always brings cultural exchange along with it, and many of the states in the region were experiencing great cultural surges as a result. In particular, it is believed that Buddhism from Korea and Shintō from Japan were first introduced to Okinawa to a significant extent at this time. Students and other travelers to Korea brought back texts, statues, rituals, and other Buddhist objects and ideas, and in exchange, King Bunei promised to send shipwrecked Koreans, and those who were the victims of Japanese pirates (wakō), back home safely.

Domestically, Bunei's reign saw significant development in the organization and formalization of the royal administration, and increased literacy and education among the administrative officials. Government documents, particularly those concerning trade and diplomacy, were first compiled in 1403. This compilation, the "Treasury of Royal Succession" Rekidai Hōan, continued to be compiled fairly regularly until 1619. However, this increased organization was not accompanied by political stability; the kings of Nanzan and Hokuzan, along with the emperor of China, all died within the span of just a few years (1395–1398). These events heightened tensions between the three kingdoms, all of which sought the favor of the Ming court, which was largely unresponsive; Bunei only received his formal investiture in 1406, ten years after succeeding his father, and less than a year before his own death.

As a result of these political instabilities, the aji (local territorial lords) began to seize more power for themselves within their tiny local domains. One aji, by the name of Hashi, deposed his neighboring lord of Azato in 1402 and seized his territory. Five years later, he led a rebellion and overthrew Bunei, establishing his own father, Shishō, as King of Chūzan. Hashi effectively ruled from the behind the scenes, and led Chūzan's army against the neighboring kingdoms, conquering Hokuzan in 1419 and Nanzan in 1429. In the intervening years, he formally succeeded his father to the throne and received investiture and the dynastic family name "Shang" (尚, Shō in Japanese or Okinawan) from the Ming court. Thus, the three kingdoms were united into the Ryūkyū Kingdom; Chūzan was not truly abolished, and the term Chūzan continued to be used to refer to the unified kingdom, or its king, up until the late 19th century.

Kings of Chūzan
Name	Kanji	Reign	Line or dynasty	Notes
Tamagusuku	玉城	1314–1336	Eiso	Son of Eiji
Seii	西威	1337–1349	Eiso	
Satto	察度	1350–1397	Satto	
Bunei	武寧	1398–1406	Satto	
Shō Shishō	尚思紹	1407–1421	First Shō	
Shō Hashi	尚巴志	1422–1429	First Shō	Continued to rule united Ryukyu until 1439.
