= Taisei (king) =

Taisei 大成

King of Ryūkyū
- Reign: 1299–1309
- Predecessor: Eiso
- Successor: Eiji
- Born: 1247
- Died: January 19, 1309 (aged 61–62)
- Issue: See list: Prince Urasoe; Eiji; Prince Gushichan; Prince Gushikawa; Prince Katsuren; Daniya-aji (a noro)
- House: Eiso
- Father: Eiso

Taisei (大成; 1247 – 19 January 1309) was a legendary local ruler of Okinawa Island.

== Life ==
He was the second ruler of the Eiso dynasty; that is, his father was King Eisō and his son was King Eiji. The years of Taisei's reign were uneventful. Taisei was the grandfather of Tamagusuku.

== Notes ==
Preceded by Eisō	King of Ryūkyū; 1299–1309	Succeeded by Eiji
