= Urasoe yōdore =

Royal mausoleum in Okinawa

Coordinates: 26°14′51.1″N 127°43′54.2″E

- 浦添ようどれ
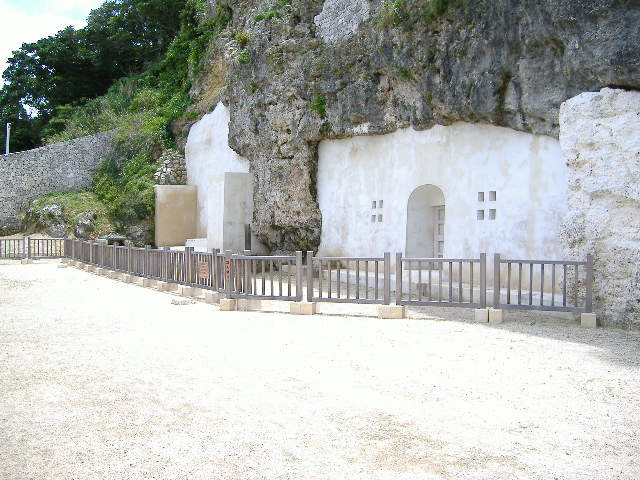
- Urasoe yōdore
- Interactive map of Urasoe yōdore
- Location: Urasoe, Okinawa
- Type: mausoleum
- Beginning date: 1261

Urasoe yōdore (浦添ようどれ or 浦添極楽山; Okinawan: Urashī yūduri) is one of the three royal mausoleums of the Ryukyu Kingdom, along with Tamaudun at Shuri Castle and Izena Tamaudun near Izena Castle in Izena, Okinawa. It is located in Urasoe, Okinawa, in a cave on a cliff to the northeast of Urasoe Castle. It houses the remains of three rulers of the Ryukyu Islands, along with one king of the Ryūkyū Kingdom separated from the others by several centuries.

== History ==
The mausoleum was established in 1261, during the reign of Eiso, before Okinawa was divided into three kingdoms, when it was simply ruled by a network of local chieftains under the leadership of one head chieftain or "king". It was completed by 1271, and included a first and second gardens, stone gateways, and stone monuments written in Chinese and Ryukyuan. Like many other structures on the island, it was extensively damaged during the 1945 Battle of Okinawa, and later researched and restored.

Eiso and two of his successors are entombed at Urasoe yōdore, in sarcophagi of a Chinese diorite stone; statues of the bodhisattvas Kannon and Jizō stand inside the cave. More than 300 years later, King Shō Nei requested to be buried at Urasoe and not in the Shō family royal mausoleum of Tamaudun. His reign had seen the invasion of Ryukyu by forces from Japan's Satsuma province, and the subjugation of the kingdom to Satsuma's suzerainty, and thus it is believed that he felt he had dishonored his family and his kingdom, and was not worthy of being buried with his ancestors.

== Burials ==
- Eiso (1229–1299)
- Shō Kōgō (尚 弘業; 1512–1576), grandfather of Shō Nei
- Shō I (d. 1584), father of Shō Nei
- King Shō Nei (1564–1620)
- Shō Ransō (尚 蘭叢; d. 1663), Queen consort of Shō Nei

== Gallery ==
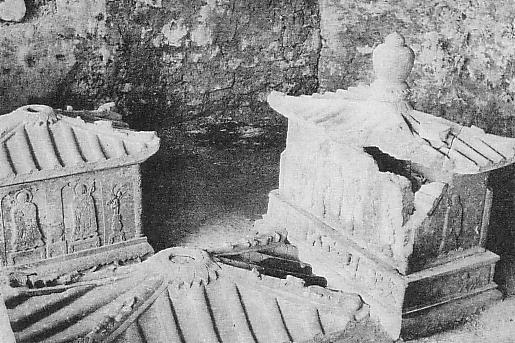
Tomb of King Eiso

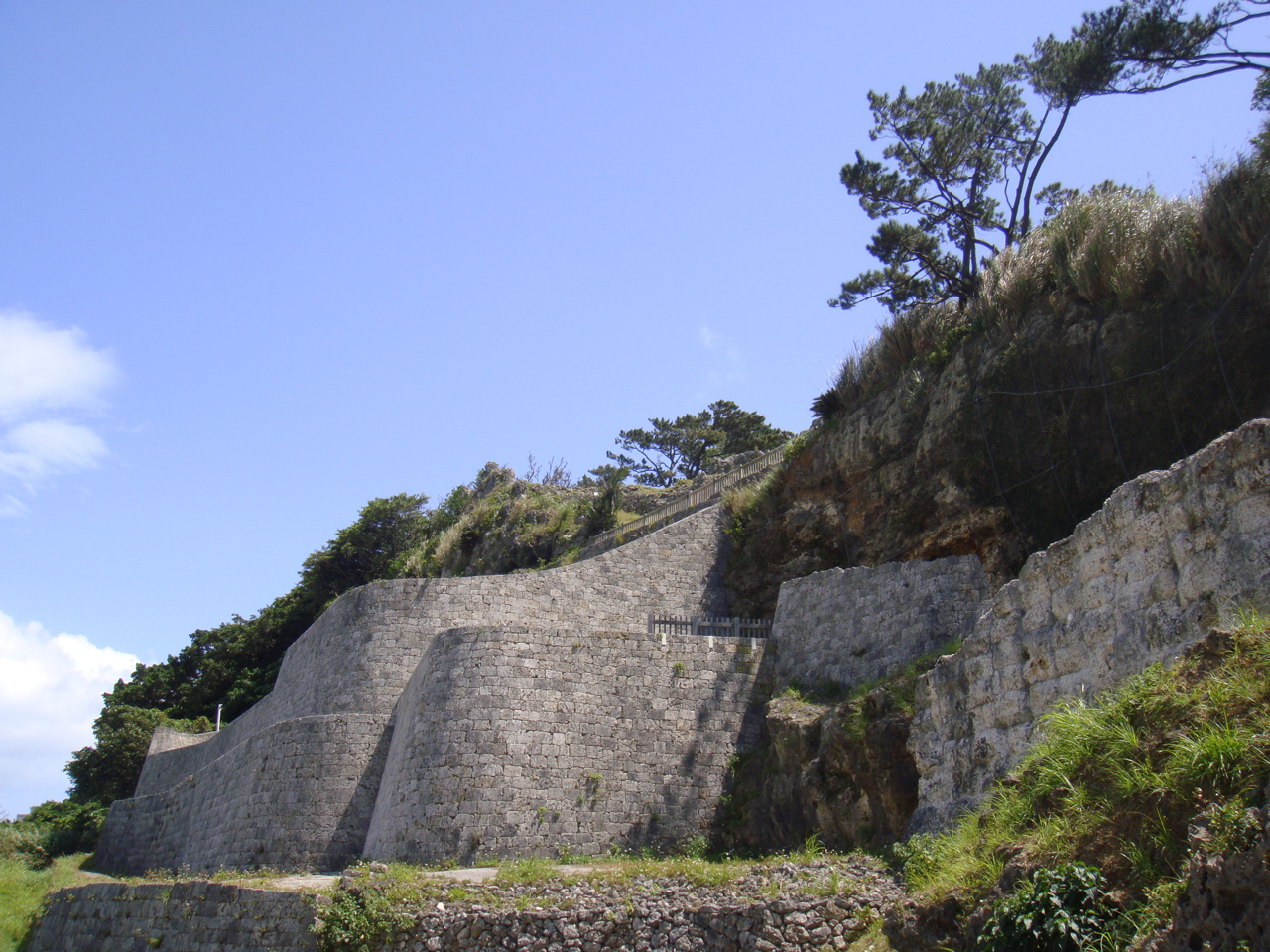
