= Eiso (king) =

Eiso 英祖

King of Ryūkyū
- Reign: 1259–1299
- Predecessor: Gihon
- Successor: Taisei
- Born: 1229; Iso Castle, Okinawa (purportedly)
- Died: 1299 (aged 69–70)
- Burial: Urasoe yōdore, Okinawa (purportedly)
- Divine name: Wezo-no-tedako (英祖日子)
- House: Eiso dynasty
- Father: Eso

Eiso (Japanese: 英祖, 1229 – 1299) was a semi-legendary king of Okinawa who reigned from 1260 to 1299. Described in the official histories of the later Ryukyu Kingdom as a descendant of the mythical Tenson dynasty, he was said to have had a miraculous birth and to have had great wisdom and virtue from infancy. After disease and famine struck the kingdom, king Gihon appointed him as sessei (prime minister). Prosperity returned, and Gihon purportedly resigned the throne to him and disappeared into hiding. He is traditionally credited with sponsoring the construction of the first Buddhist temple in Okinawa, Gokuraku-ji, establishing Okinawan rule over Amami Ōshima, rejecting the suzerainty of the Yuan dynasty, and overseeing the construction of his tomb, Urasoe yōdore.

Eiso is not attested in any contemporary accounts, although he is the earliest ruler mentioned in the Omoro Sōshi, a set of chants and songs compiled during the 16th century. He is mentioned by later Ryukyuan histories and monuments. Despite the traditional claims that he ruled over all of Okinawa, modern historians generally describe him as a local ruler around Urasoe. He is said to have ruled from Urasoe Castle, but the surviving construction postdates his reign; the Omoro Sōshi connects him to nearby Iso Castle.

== Traditional narrative ==
In the official histories of the Ryukyu Kingdom, Eiso is described as the son of a 13th-century Okinawan aji (lord) named Eso. According to the 18th century Chūzan Seifu, Eso was the aji of Iso and a descendant of the mythical Tenson dynasty. He married, but had no children with his wife for many years. In 1229, his wife (with a name unknown to the official histories) had a dream where she was impregnated by a divine entity, alternatively described as Shangdi or the Sun; at the next full moon, she gave birth, filling their house with a bright light and a sweet aroma. Her newborn son, Eiso, was heralded as a divine child. Eiso was supposedly wise, virtuous, and clairvoyant from infancy. He became well known among the populace for talent and virtue from when he was seven years old, and he received a great following as his fame grew.

These histories describe Shunten, the legendary son of samurai Minamoto no Tametomo, as the founder of the Shunten dynasty. His son Shunbajunki took the throne after his death in 1237, and his grandson Gihon became king after Shunbajunki's death in 1248. The following year, a great famine and epidemic are said to have struck the island, killing half of the population. Gihon declared his intention to resign as king, and consulted his ministers to find a suitable replacement. They recommended Eiso due to his auspicious birth and virtue. Gihon appointed Eiso as his sessei (prime minister), and the island's plague was halted, while harvests became bountiful. He became widely adored by the populace.

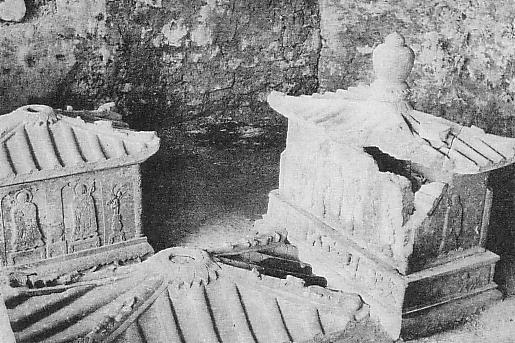
Eiso's purported sarcophagus at Urasoe yōdore, 1955

In 1259, Gihon is said to have resigned the throne in favor of Eiso, saying "You are beloved by Heaven. It is proper for you to receive the imperial command, so to serve as a parent-figure to the people." Eiso refused, despite the ministers encouragement, leading Gihon to resign and go into hiding, with his later life and death unknown. The Chūzan Seifu claims Eiso's first official act in office was to commission the construction of his tomb, the Urasoe yōdore. Due to his widely known virtue, he was able to establish his rule over the islands to the north of Okinawa, such as Amami Ōshima. He is credited as the patron of the first Buddhist temple in Okinawa, Gokuraku-ji, after a Japanese monk named Zenkan was shipwrecked on the island around 1270 and requested permission to construct a temple.

In 1272, an emissary from Kublai Khan, the emperor of the Mongol Yuan dynasty is said to have arrived at Eiso's court to demand Okinawa's submission to the Yuan. The emissary was rejected. A Yuan contingent came in 1276, again demanding Okinawan submission; when they were again rejected, they fought with the Okinawans before being driven away, taking around 130 people captive.

Eiso purportedly died in 1299 and was buried in his Urasoe yōdore tomb. The official histories record him as the progenitor of a line of four obscure rulers over the first half of the 14th century: Taisei, Eiji, Tamagusuku, and Seii. After Eiji's death in 1314, the young king Tamagusuku is said to have mismanaged the kingdom, and it collapsed into three small feuding states. Eiso's dynasty likely continued in southern Okinawa kingdom of Sannan: a late 14th-century noble named Ōejishi and an early 15th-century king named Ōōso may be members of this lineage.

== Historiography ==
No contemporary sources exist which mention Eiso; the first Okinawan ruler mentioned in outside sources is Satto, a late 14th-century king. The Omoro Sōshi, a collection of Okinawan songs and chants compiled in the 16th century, record him under the name "Ezo no Ikusamoi". He is the earliest known ruler to appear in these songs. Eiso is also mentioned by a 1522 monument erected by king Shō Shin criticizing the practice of junshi (ritual suicide after the death of a ruler). He is listed as one of the ancient Okinawan monarchs under whose reign the practice did not take place.

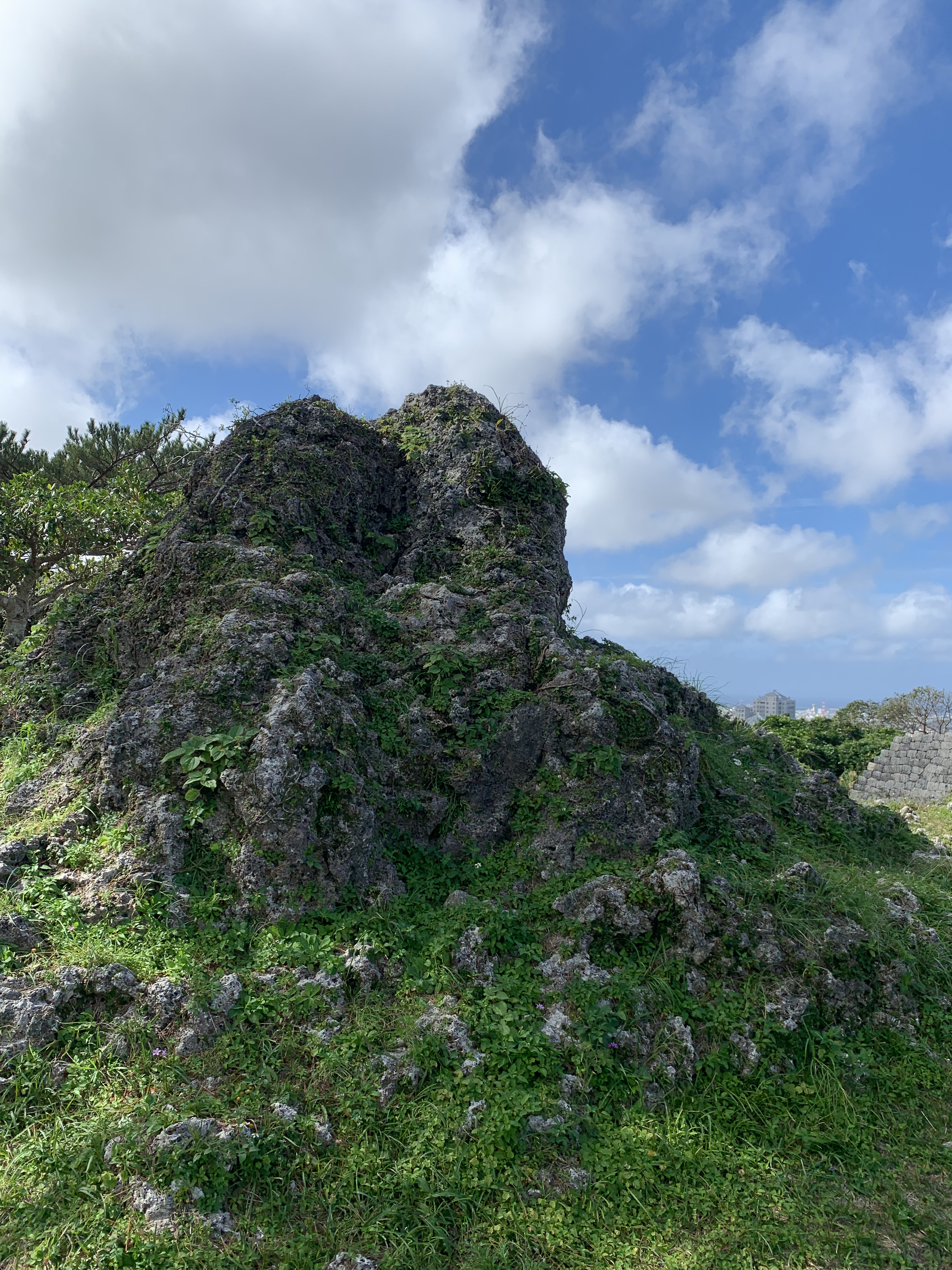
Ruins of Urasoe Castle, Eiso's purported capital

Urasoe Castle is traditionally described as the capital of many early Okinawan rulers, including Shunten, Eiso, and Satto. Much of the gusuku (castle) dates to the later 14th century, when it became a large and prosperous administrative center. As such, Satto may have been the earliest known Okinawan lord to rule from the site; historian Gregory Smits writes that it is extremely unlikely that Eiso ruled from Urasoe Castle or was buried at Urasoe yōdore, and that his purported status as sessei is an anachronism. However, he views it as likely that he was a real person, due to the ubiquitous mentions of him in early historical sources. The attribution of him to Urasoe may have been part of an attempt to tie the early kings of Okinawa together into a coherent succession.

Some of the songs in the Omoro Sōshi connect Eiso to Iso Castle (伊祖城跡), pronounced Iizu during the song's era, identically with the name of the king. As such, the king was likely named after the castle. Local legends describe Iso Castle as the birthplace of Eiso and the home of his ancestors.

Adjacent to the castle is the Urasoe yōdore mausoleum. A 1620 monument at the mausoleum, the Yōtore no Hi no Mon, is the earliest known source connecting Eiso to the site, although it is unknown if the idea predates this. The monument was erected by king Shō Nei, stating that the site is Eiso's tomb, and that he wished to renovate it and bury himself and his ancestors at the site. Archaeological excavations at the site found two lacquered wooden coffins within stone sarcophagi inside chambers within the adjacent cliff; stone tiles on the sarcophagi feature inscriptions marking them as Goryeo tiles made in the "Mizunoto Tori" year, part of the sixty-year Sexagenary cycle. Radiocarbon dating supports a late 13th-century date for the material. Using this, historian and archaeologist Asato Susumu writes that the sarcophagii were likely made in 1273.

The 18th century Chūzan Seifu, compiled by Sai On, and the 17th century Chūzan Seikan, compiled by Shō Shōken, are the prominent official histories of the Ryukyu kingdom. Both depict Eiso and Gihon, emphasizing their virtue, but they differ in their ideological and philosophical orientation. The Chūzan Seifu gives him the divine name Wezo-no-tedako (英祖日子).

The mid-20th-century historian Zenchū Nakahara saw Eiso as the first historical Ryukyuan monarch, the lord of a small area around Urasoe. Inamura Kenpu, writing in the 1960s, described Eiso as a prototypical example of the early nobility which emerged following the spread of agriculture to the islands. Most modern historians of Ryukyu view him as a local lord in Urasoe, although Asato affirms Eiso controlled all of Okinawa, arguing that Urasoe and its contemporary gusuku show enough uniformity in their construction to suggest that their lords were linked.

Preceded by Gihon	King of Ryūkyū; 1260–1299	Succeeded by Taisei
