= Satto =

King of Chūzan (r. 1350–1395)

Satto 察度

King of Chūzan
- Reign: c. 1355 – c. 1397
- Predecessor: Seii
- Successor: Bunei
- Born: Jana, Chūzan (purported)
- Died: c. 1397
- Issue: Bunei (purported)
- Divine name: Oho-mamono (大真物)
- House: Satto dynasty

Satto (r. c. 1355 – c. 1397) was a king of the Okinawan kingdom of Chūzan. In the traditional histories of the Ryukyu Kingdom, he is described as the successor to King Seii, and as a virtuous ruler who later became decadent. He was born to peasant farmers near Urasoe, but was able to purchase iron agricultural tools from Japanese traders, which he distributed among the peasantry; as a result, he became acclaimed by the people and allowed agriculture to flourish.

The first Okinawan ruler mentioned in Chinese sources, Satto accepted tributary status to Ming China, for which he was given lucrative trade license and declared the King of Ryukyu. Satto likely controlled only a small portion of central Okinawa, including his capitals of Urasoe and Shuri, and the main port of Naha. He established the temple of Gokoku-ji and may have begun construction on Shuri Castle. Historian Gregory Smits theorizes that he may have originated in Korea, due to political connections to Joseon and a name seemingly derived from a Korean term for a local official, sado. His purported son Bunei took the throne after his death and was later overthrown by the First Shō dynasty.

== Biography ==
The traditional histories of the Ryukyu Kingdom claim the island of Okinawa split into three kingdoms under the reign of the legendary king Tamagusuku. Northern Okinawa was said to have become the lordship of Hokuzan, while southern Okinawa became the lordship of Sannan. Tamagusuku controlled the region of Chūzan in central Okinawa around the communities of Urasoe, Shuri, and Naha, owing the allegiance of a number of local lords and chieftains known as aji. Whether these three polities existed as territorial states is debated academically. Tamagusuku was said to have died in 1336, and left the kingdom to his ten-year-old son Seii. Seii's mother served as his regent.

=== Reign ===
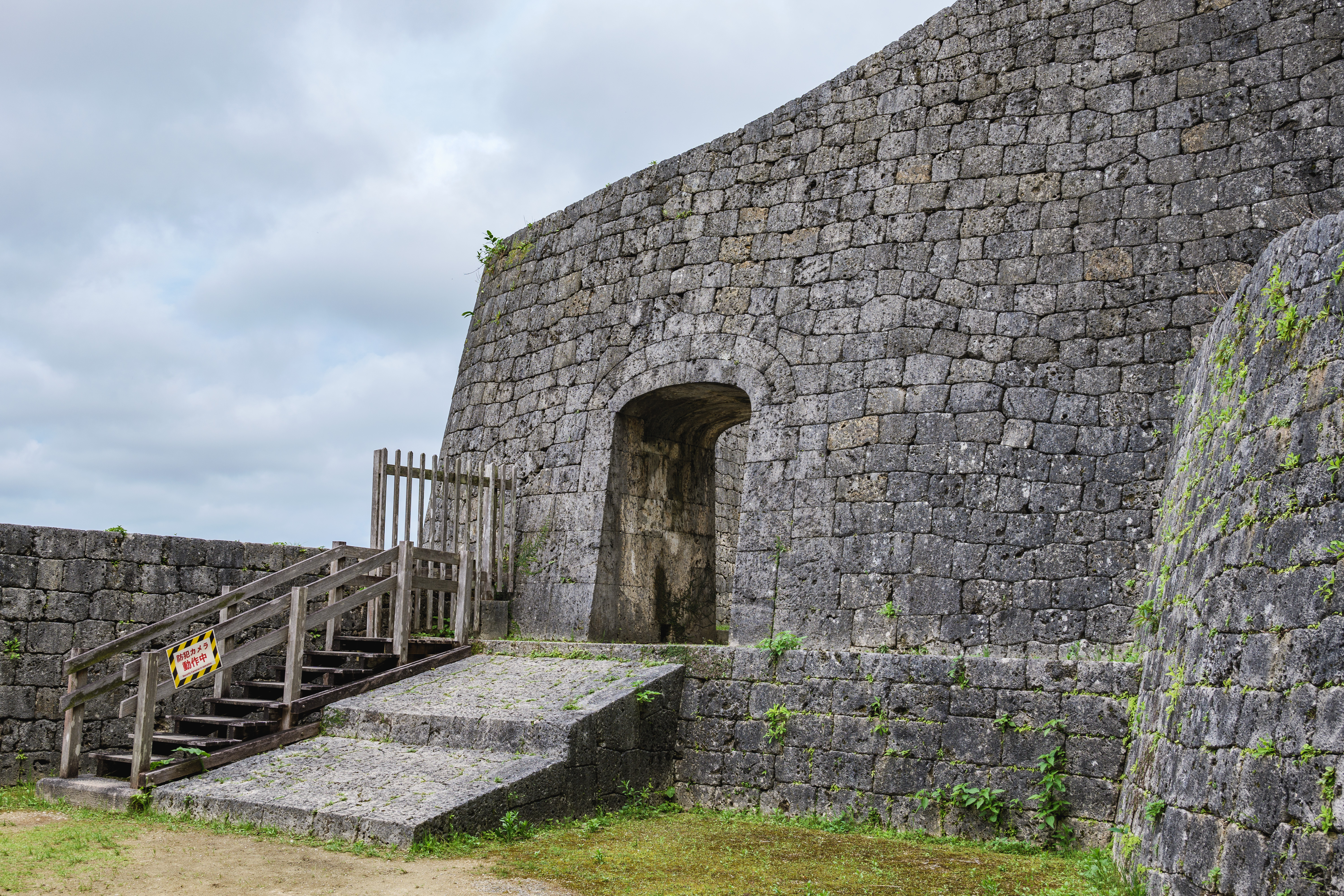
Satto was said to rule from Urasoe Castle, seen here as a modern reconstruction.

According to the official histories, Satto was born to a peasant family in Jana, a village near Urasoe. He was wise and hard-working, and was able to purchase large amounts of iron tools from Japanese merchants with help from his wife. He distributed these tools among the peasants, bringing him acclaim and allowing agriculture to flourish in the region.

Satto rose to prominence and took control of Urasoe, the capital of Chūzan, around the time of Tamagusuku's death. Seii died around 1355, and local rulers refused to enthrone the young king's heir. Satto took control of the kingdom, ruling from the gusuku of Urasoe, purportedly with a large amount of popular support. Although later histories describe the gusuku as the capital of the legendary king Shunten and the proto-historical Eiso, Satto is likely the earliest known king to rule from the site. Remains from the site date to around the late 14th century, and the gusuku appears to have become a significant power base around 1350.

"Satto" may be a generic title for a ruler; a king of Sannan bears the name Shōsatto, and a Ryukyuan diplomat sent by Satto to China in 1392 is also named Satto in the Ming annals. It is likely based off the Korean word sado, a local official, and there may have been multiple rulers who ruled under the name. Due to this, historian Gregory Smits theorizes that Satto may have been a seafaring merchant from Goryeo who fled to Okinawa around the 1330s. Smits suspects a relation with Onsadō, a king of Sannan mentioned in the Joseon annals who fled to Korea in 1398. Many historians believe Onsadō was the same person as Shōsatto.

The Chūzan Seikan ('Mirror of Chūzan'), a 17th century official history of the Ryukyu Kingdom, described Satto as a good king who in his later reign fell into decadence and lost his humility. He is credited with establishing Gokoku-ji, the second Buddhist temple in Okinawa, in 1384. The earliest portions of Shuri Castle may have been constructed under his reign, and he purportedly transferred the capital to Shuri. He is credited with establishing the community of Kumemura, a Chinese merchant enclave adjacent to Shuri, in 1392. A type of cash coinage, the Chūzan Tsūhō, was allegedly minted under Satto's reign, predating the three known types of Ryukyuan cash coins produced around the mid-15th century.

=== Tribute and international relations ===
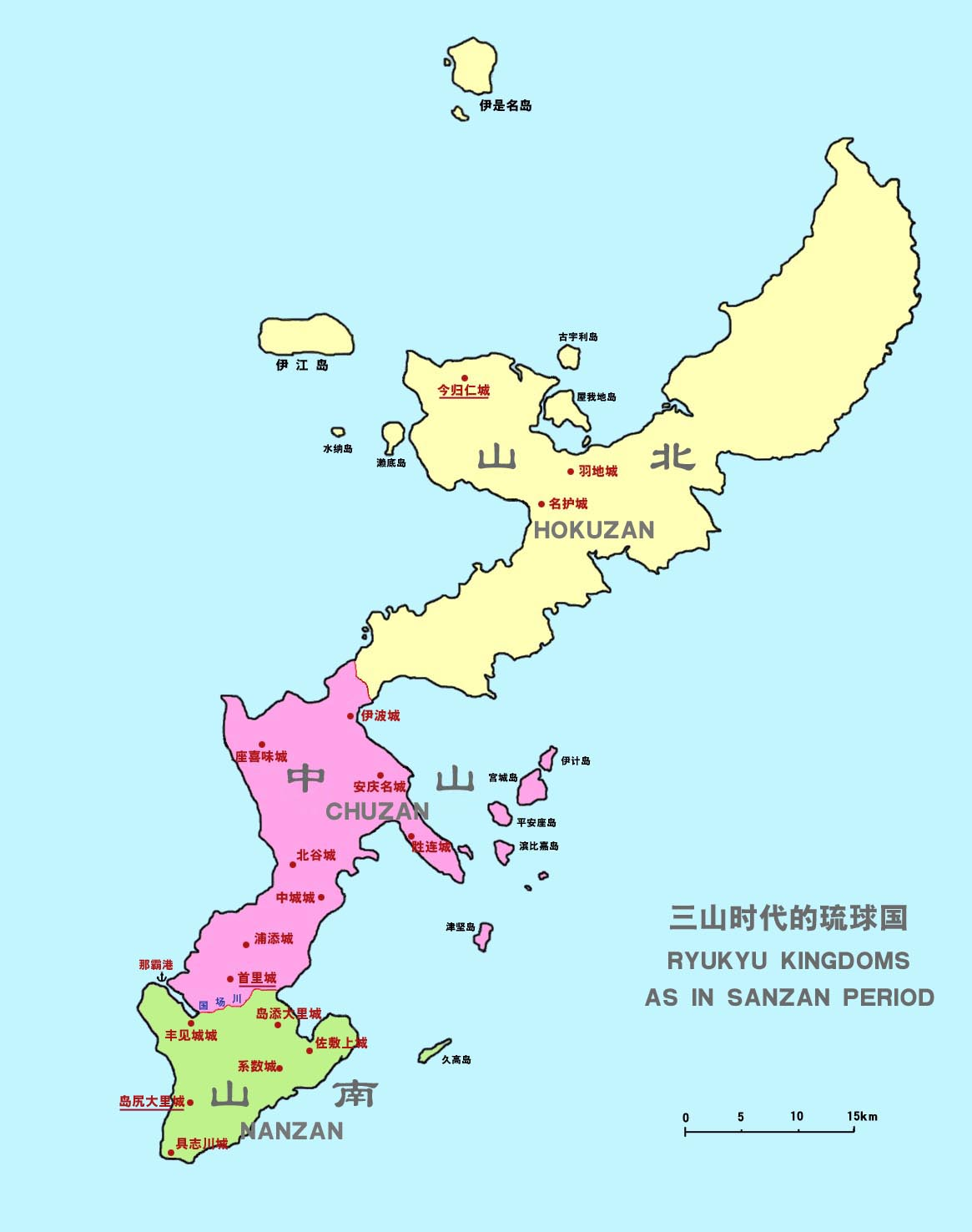
The traditionally-accepted division of Okinawa during the Sanzan period

The Ming dynasty took over China from the previous Yuan in 1368, and began to establish its tributary system across East Asia. A Ming official named Yang Zai traveled to Okinawa after an unsuccessful mission to Kyushu, and likely explained the Chinese tributary system to Satto before returning home to China. He returned to Chūzan in 1372 with a decree from the Ming court asking for tribute. Satto accepted, and was given the title "King of Ryukyu", despite only controlling a small region of central Okinawa.

Accepting tributary status allowed for lucrative trade licenses with China. In 1374, Satto dispatched his brother Taiki to Nanjing alongside a group of emissaries and an offering of Okinawan goods. The Hongwu Emperor gave the Chūzan emissaries various gifts, and sent a court official to accompany them home. Satto was given textiles, ceramics, books, alongside a silver royal seal and documents officially recognizing him as king. In 1382, the Ming began to recognize two other polities in Okinawa, Hokuzan and Nanzan, as kingdoms. All three states sent frequent tributary missions, although Hokuzan and Nanzan were forced to conduct trade through Chūzan's port of Naha. Between 1372 and 1398, 57 tributary missions were sent from Okinawa, the most sent to China by any country.

Satto is the first ruler of Okinawa mentioned in Chinese records. Historian Ikuta Shigeru theorizes from inconsistencies in tribute records that Satto, his supposed prince Bunei, and the Sannan king Shōsatto, may have been siblings.

In 1389, the year after Taejo of Joseon took control of Korea from Goryeo, Satto dispatched a embassy to the Joseon court. The envoy brought a group of Koreans who had been captured by pirates, alongside various gifts from Okinawa and the surrounding regions. In 1394, Satto petitioned Joseon court to send Shōsatto, the son of the king of Sannan, back to Okinawa.

Legends describe Yonahasedo Toyomiya, a member of one of the feuding noble clans in the Miyako Islands, sailing to Okinawa as part of a group of Miyako students and studying in Chūzan for three years of Satto's reign. Toyomiya pledged tribute to Chūzan and received gifts and trade agreements from Satto, after which he returned south, purportedly becoming the lord of Miyako and Yaeyama.

== Death and legacy ==
According to the official histories, Satto was cursed by heaven for his turn to decadence, and died after he touched a poisonous snake with his left hand. His purported son Bunei took the throne around 1397. Satto has no known tomb. Later official histories, such as the Chūzan Seifu, describe Bunei as a decadent ruler. He was overthrown by Shō Hashi in 1405, who installed his father Shō Shishō as king, ending Satto's dynasty and beginning the First Shō dynasty.

By the early 16th century and the reign of Shō Shin, Satto was acknowledged as part of a line of rulers which eventually formed the Ryukyu Kingdom. He was granted the divine name Oho-mamono (大真物). Smits describes his biographies in later official histories as hagiographical (adulatory and idealized), emphasizing his virtue to justify him taking over the throne from Seii's heir.

Regnal titles
Preceded by Seii	King of Chūzan; 1350–1395	Succeeded by Bunei
