= Zenchū Nakahara =

Japanese historian of Ryukyu (1890–1964)

Zenchū Nakahara (仲原 善忠, Nakahara Zenchū; 15 July 1890 – 25 November 1964) was a Japanese scholar, known particularly for his work on the Omoro sōshi, a written collection of songs and poems which constitutes an oral history of Okinawa and the Ryūkyū Kingdom.

Nakahara was born in Nakazato magiri, on Kumejima. He attended the Okinawa Normal School, and Hiroshima Normal High School, before going on to teach at various schools in Tokyo, Shizuoka prefecture, and elsewhere.

He first began research into Okinawan history around the age of 50. After the end of World War II, he researched the native Ryukyuan religion, and produced a paper which drew great praise from Yanagita Kunio, widely regarded today as the father of Japanese ethnology. He would go on to produce a number of papers on topics relating to Okinawan history, omoro, and ethnology, as well as a middle school textbook entitled History of Ryukyu (琉球の歴史, ryūkyū no rekishi).

== Selected works ==
- "On the seji faith" (霊力の信仰について, Seji no shinkō ni tsuite)
- "Omoro: A New Interpretation" (おもろ新釈, Omoro shinshaku)
- History of Ryukyu (琉球の歴史, ryūkyū no rekishi)
- Schoolbook Omoro Sōshi (校本おもろさうし, kōhon omoro sōshi)
- General Index and Encyclopedia of the Omoro Sōshi (おもろさうし辞典・総索引, Omoro sōshi jiten / sōsakuin)
