= Eiji (king) =

Eiji 英慈

King of Ryūkyū
- Reign: 1309–1313
- Predecessor: Taisei
- Successor: Tamagusuku
- Born: 1268
- Died: October 10, 1313 (aged 44–45)
- Father: Taisei

Eiji (英慈; 1268 – 10 October 1313) was a legendary local ruler of Okinawa Island. Born as the second son of King Taisei, his mother’s name was unknown.

== Life ==
He was the third ruler of Eiso Dynasty; that is, his grandfather was King Eiso and his father was King Taisei. The five years of Eiji's reign were uneventful, but after his death, the island was split into three polities. Eiji was the father of Tamagusuku.

== Notes ==
Preceded by Taisei	King of Ryūkyū; 1309–1313	Succeeded by Tamagusuku
