= Seii (king) =

Seii 西威 see-i

King of Ryūkyū
- Reign: 1337–1349
- Predecessor: Tamagusuku
- Successor: Satto
- Born: 1328
- Died: April 30, 1349 (aged 20–21)
- Father: Tamagusuku

Seii (西威; 1328 – 30 April 1349) was a legendary local ruler of Okinawa Island. He succeeded his father, Tamagusuku, in 1336, at the age of ten. His reign is characterized by the meddling of his mother in government affairs, and her corruption. The king's mother took advantage of her privileges and position, and severely damaged popular support for her son.

== Life ==
Seii died in 1349. The ruler of Urasoe, Satto, seized power for himself.

== Notes ==
| Preceded by Tamagusuku | King of Ryūkyū; 1337–1349 | Succeeded by Satto |
