= Tamagusuku =

Tamagusuku 玉城

King of Ryukyu King of Chūzan
- Reign: 1314–1336
- Predecessor: Eiji
- Successor: Seii
- Born: 1296
- Died: April 22, 1336 (aged 39–40)
- Father: Eiji

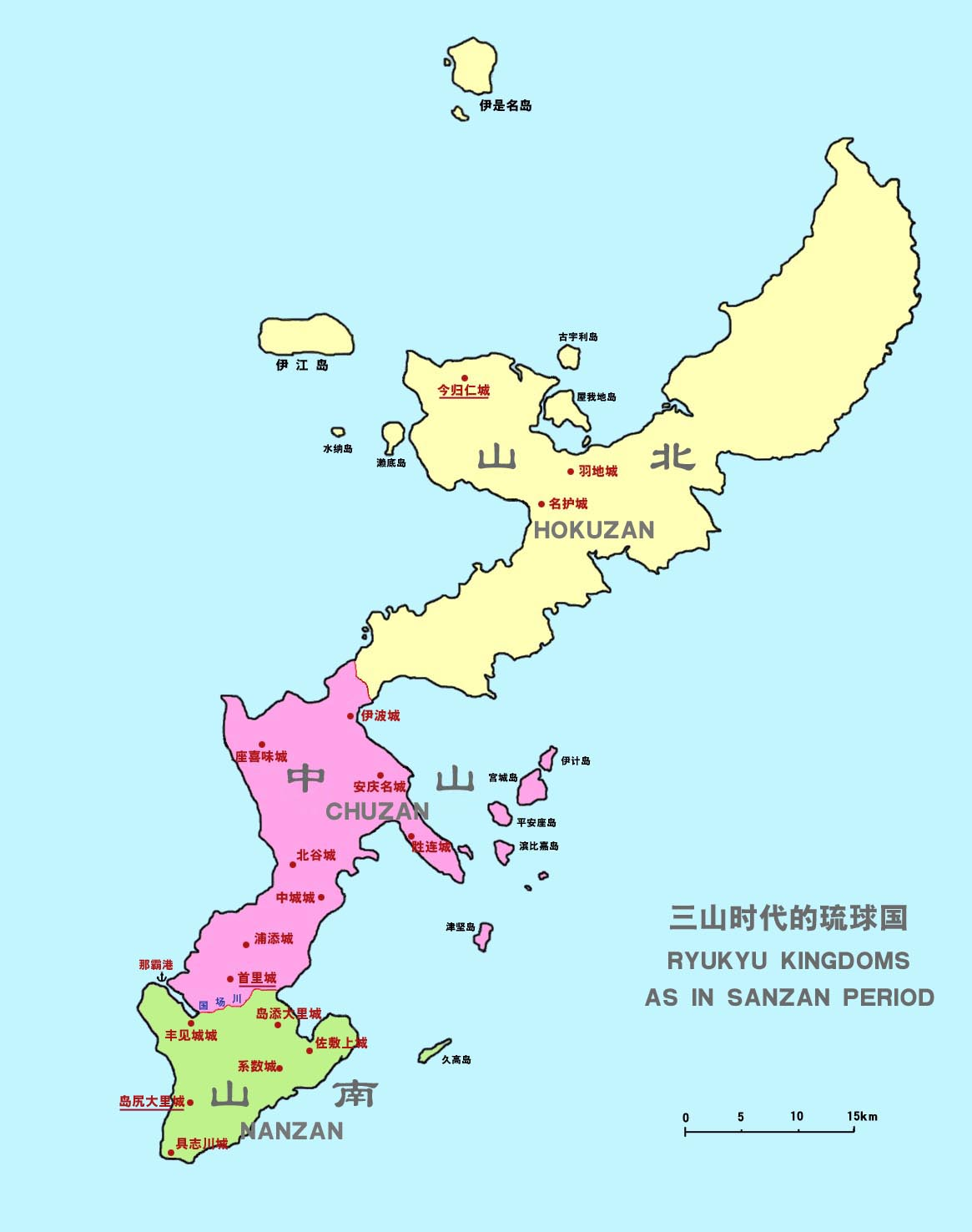
Okinawa Island was split into three polities during the Sanzan period

Tamagusuku (玉城; 1296 – 22 April 1336) was a legendary local ruler of Okinawa Island.

== Life ==
According to Ryukyu's official history, Okinawa was split into three polities during the reign of Tamagusuku. He was the third son of Eiji (r. 1309–1313), he was the fourth ruler of the Eiso dynasty.

Succeeding his father Eiji as paramount chief of Okinawa's territorial lords at the age of nineteen, Tamagusuku lacked the charisma and leadership skills to command respect and loyalty from those lords (the anji). A number of these lords rebelled, and the island of Okinawa came to be divided into three kingdoms. Tamagusuku, remaining in Urasoe, became the chief of Chūzan. His failure to institute reforms or innovations in governance is generally claimed as one of the causes of the fall of the dynasty, which ended with Tamagusuku's son and successor Seii.

The Aji of Ōzato fled south from Tamagusuku's capital at Urasoe and, along with his followers, became the King of Nanzan. The Lord of Nakijin, based some distance to the north, declared himself King of Hokuzan. He was succeeded by his only son Seii.

== Notes ==
Preceded by Eiji	King of Ryūkyū; 1314–1336	Succeeded by Seii
