= Uegusuku Castle (Tomigusuku) =

Coordinates: 26°22′36″N 126°46′10″E

Uegusuku Castle 宇江城城
- Tomigusuku, Okinawa

Site information
- Type: Gusuku
- Controlled by: Ryūkyū Kingdom (early 15th century?–1879); Empire of Japan (1879–1945); United States Military Government of the Ryukyu Islands(1945-1950); United States Civil Administration of the Ryukyu Islands(1950-1972); Japan(1972-present)
- Open to the public: yes
- Condition: Ruins

Location

Site history
- Materials: Ryukyuan limestone, wood

Uegusuku Castle (宇江城, Uegusuku jō; Okinawan: Wiigushiku) is a Ryūkyūan gusuku in Tomigusuku, Okinawa. The castle is in ruins.
