= Nago Castle =

Gusuku in Nago, Okinawa Prefecture, Japan

Coordinates: 26.5875758°N 127.9792328°E

Nago Castle 名護城
- Nago, Okinawa
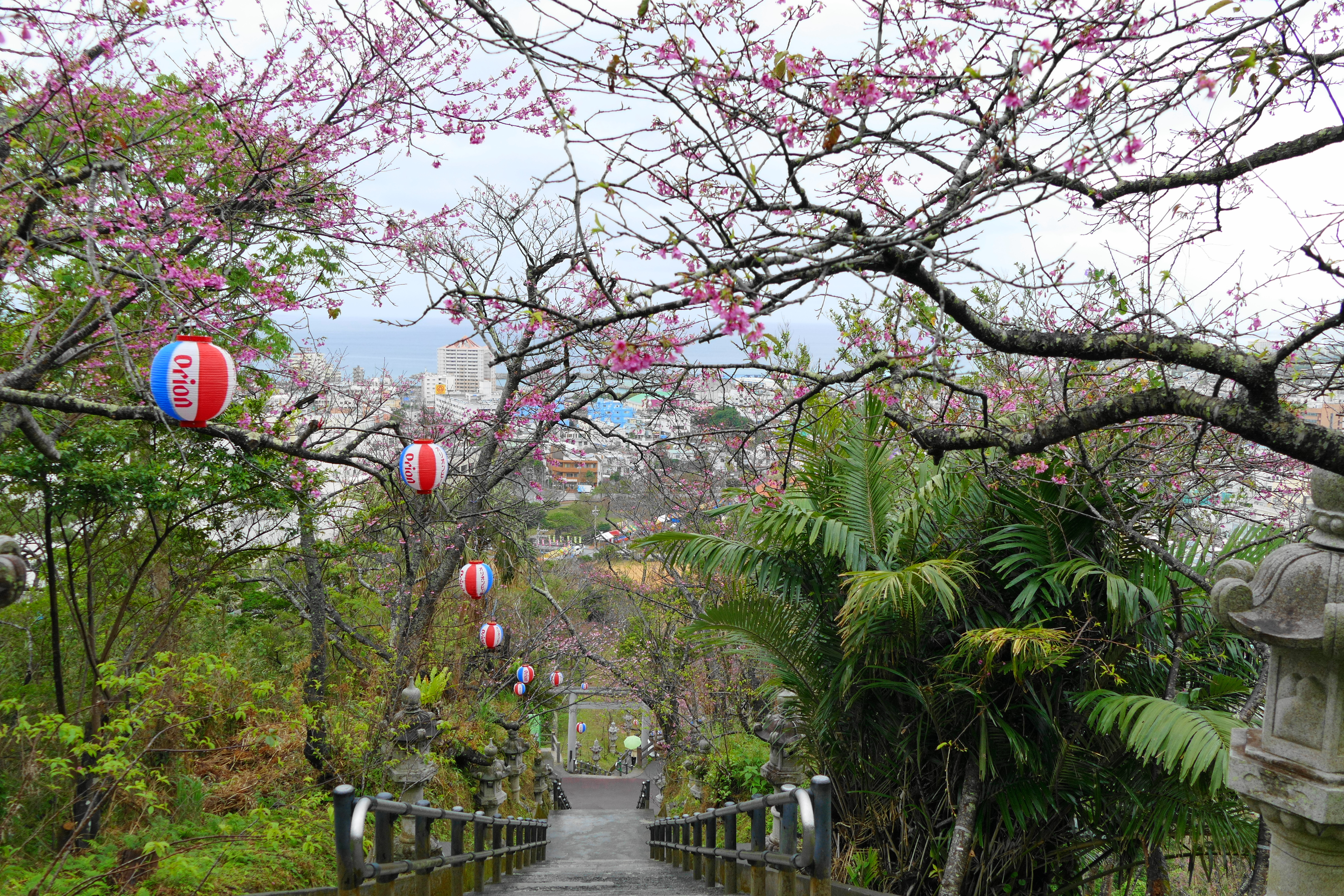
- Nago Castle in 2015

Site information
- Type: Gusuku
- Controlled by: Hokuzan (14th century–1416); Ryūkyū Kingdom (1416–1879); Empire of Japan (1879–1945); United States Military Government of the Ryukyu Islands(1945-1950); United States Civil Administration of the Ryukyu Islands(1950-1972); Japan(1972-present)
- Open to the public: yes
- Condition: Ruins

Location

Site history
- Built: early 14th century
- In use: early 14th century–1609
- Materials: Ryukyuan limestone, wood
- Battles/wars: Invasion of Hokuzan

Garrison information
- Occupants: Aji of Nago Magiri

Nago Castle (名護城, Nago jō; Okinawan: Nagu gushiku) is a Ryukyuan gusuku in Nago, Okinawa. It was built in the 14th century and served as the home of the Aji of Nago Magiri. In 1416, the army of Chūzan, led by Shō Hashi, attacked and captured the castle during the invasion of Hokuzan.
