= Gusuku =

Castles or fortresses in the Ryukyu Islands that feature stone walls

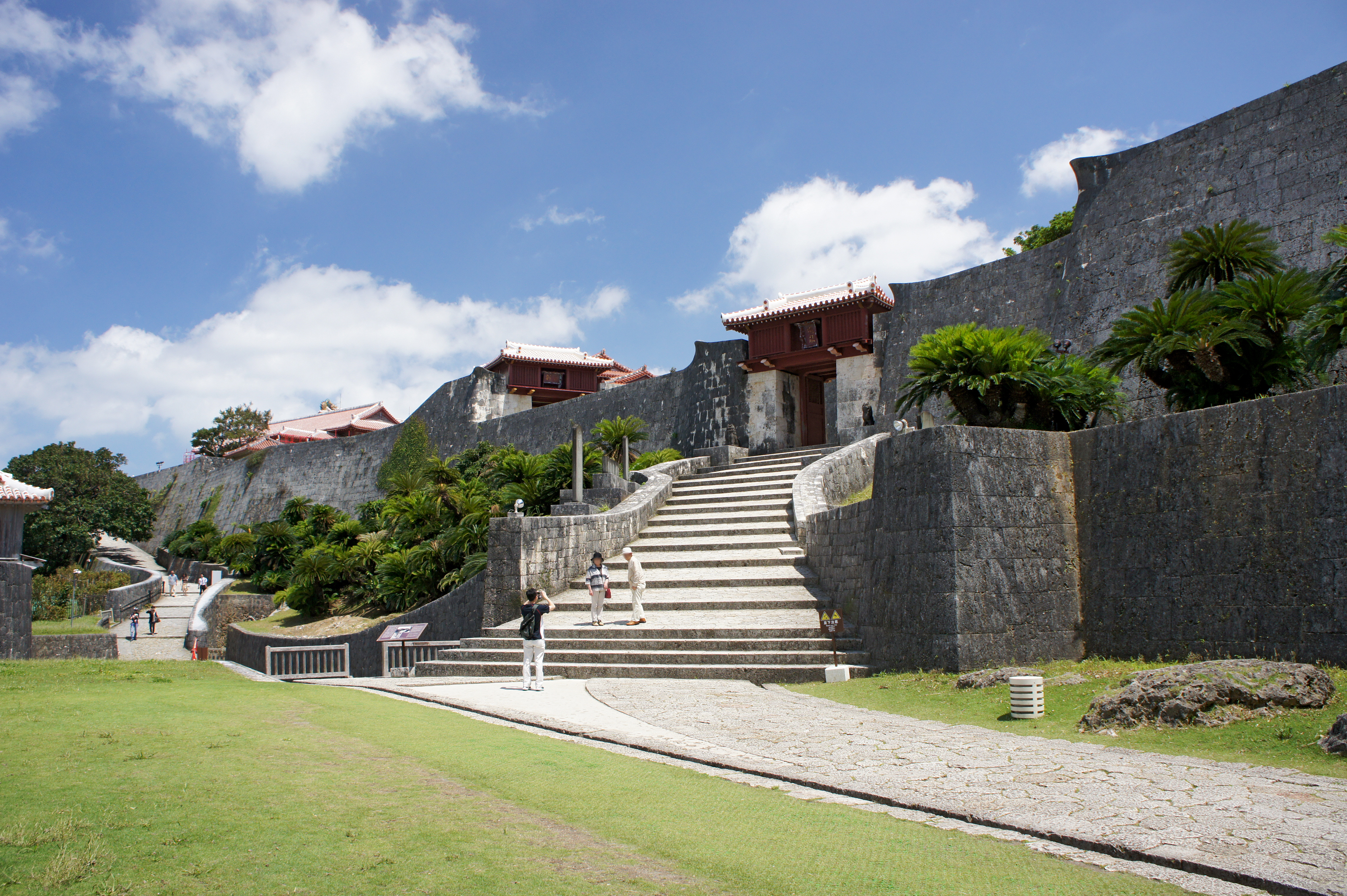
Walls of Shuri Castle

In the Ryukyu Islands, gusuku (グスク, 御城; Okinawan: gushiku) are castles and fortresses that feature stone walls. The origin of gusuku remain controversial. The Gusuku period of the islands is the archaeological period in which most gusuku are thought to have been built; it follows the shell-mound period and precedes the Sanzan period. Many gusuku and related cultural remains on Okinawa Island have been listed by UNESCO as World Heritage Sites under the title Gusuku Sites and Related Properties of the Kingdom of Ryukyu.

== Philological analysis ==
The Yarazamori Gusuku Inscription (1554) contains phrases, "pile gusuku" (くすくつませ) and "pile up gusuku and ..." (くすくつみつけて); apparently, gusuku in these phrases refers to stone walls. In the Omoro Sōshi (16th–17th centuries), the term gusuku is written as "くすく," or "ぐすく" in hiragana. Occasionally, the Chinese character "城" (castle) is assigned to it. In later ryūka and kumi odori, the reading shiro is also used for the same Chinese character, in addition to also using 城内 (shiro-uchi; inside the castle). The references to gusuku in the Omoro Sōshi are mostly about castles and fortresses, but sacred places and places of worship are called gusuku as well. In some cases, gusuku simply refers to Shuri Castle. The Liuqiu-guan yiyu (琉球館訳語), a Okinawan dictionary written in Chinese, maps Chinese "皇城" (imperial palace) to the transcription "姑速姑" (gu-su-gu). Similarly, the Yiyu yinshi (音韻字海) assigns "窟宿孤" (ku-su-gu) to "皇城."

== Etymology ==
There is no consensus about the etymology of gusuku. Chamberlain analyzed the word as the combination of gu (< honorific go 御) and shuku (宿). Kanazawa Shōzaburō also segmented into gu and suku but considered that the latter half was cognate with Old Japanese shiki, in which ki was a loan from Old Korean. Iha Fuyū proposed that suku was cognate with soko (塞, fortress). Hirata Tsugumasa considered that suku was cognate with Japanese soko (底, bottom). Similarly, Higashionna Kanjun raised doubts over the analysis of gu since older records always used honorific u (< o) instead of gu (< go). Nakahara Zenchū identified gu as go (stone).

== Common features ==
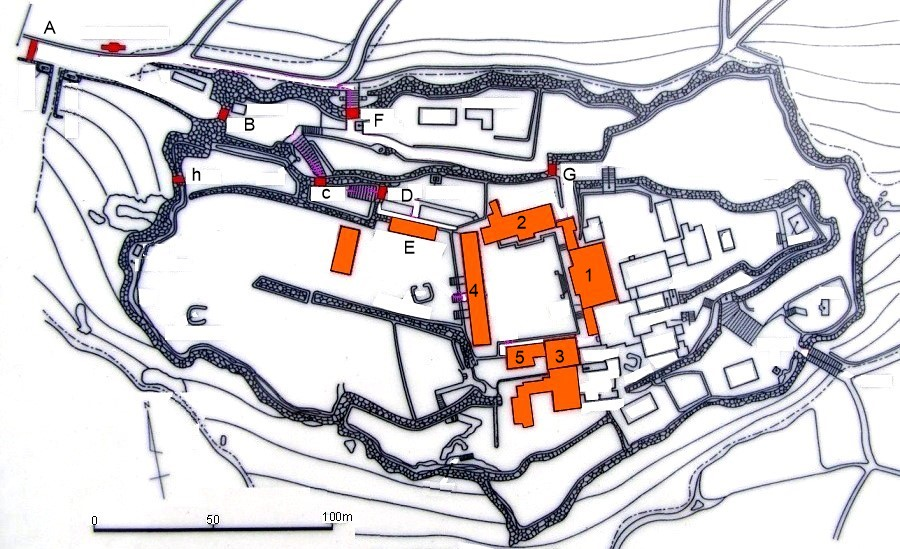
Layout of Shuri Castle

=== Walls ===
The most prominent feature of most gusuku is their wall(s). Gusuku walls are primarily made with Ryukyuan limestone and, sometimes, coral. There are three types of gusuku walls: aikata-zumi, nozura-zumi, and nuno-zumi. Examples of each are Nakagusuku Castle, Nakijin Castle, Zakimi Castle, and parts of Shuri Castle. The shape of gusuku walls usually follows the contours of the land. They are usually thick, and sometimes have low parapets atop them. Some gusuku walls, like those of Nakagusuku Castle, were designed to resist cannon fire.

=== Bailey ===
Gusuku have one or more baileys. The baileys of typical gusuku usually contained a residence, a well, an utaki, and storage buildings. Larger gusuku, like Nakijin Castle, could have more than five baileys, while smaller gusuku, like Iha Castle, had a single bailey.

=== Gates ===
Gusuku have one or more entrances, often guarded by a heavy gate or gatehouse. Gates were the strongpoints of gusuku. Many gusuku, like Nakijin Castle, were adapted to have gun ports next to their gates.

=== Main Hall ===
At the heart of most gusuku was the Main Hall (正殿, Seiden). The Main Hall was typically the residence of a feudal lord (Aji). The palace at Shuri Castle is the most prominent Main Hall, being the only one remaining, but the site of the Main Hall is very obvious at other gusuku, such as Katsuren Castle.

=== Utaki ===
Almost all gusuku contain or are near an utaki (御嶽), shrines and sites of religious importance in the Ryukyuan religion. The relationship between utaki and gusuku has led some experts to question the origin and essence of gusuku.

== Research ==
=== Okinawa Islands ===
Although it is widely recognized within the Okinawa Islands that gusuku are castles/fortresses, there is ample reason to question this perception. The origin and essence of gusuku were actively discussed in the 1960s and 70s and remain controversial.

Cultural geographer Nakamatsu Yashū claimed that the essence of gusuku was a sacred place. His theory was backed by decades of field work that was not limited to the Okinawa Islands but that extended to Amami, Miyako and Yaeyama. He revealed that an overwhelming majority of what were called gusuku by local communities did not look like castles or fortresses at all. In fact, they were too isolated from local communities, too small to live in and lacked water supply. Among hundreds of gusuku, only a dozen were fortifications. Each community usually had a gusuku. Gusuku were typically located on hills, but some were on sand dunes, on cliff edges, and in caves. In some communities, what were called gusuku were actually stone tombs. Nakamatsu explained the great diversity of gusuku by one feature in common: sacredness. According to Nakamatsu, a gusuku was in origin a place of "aerial burial." The reason that a dozen of gusuku were transformed into fortress/castle-like structures is unclear, but he conjectured that some rulers had expanded gusuku substantially by building their family residences around them. Shuri Castle, for example, encompasses sacred places such as Sui mui gusuku and Madan mui gusuku, which suggests the original nature of the castle.

Archaeologists from Okinawa Prefecture have labeled some archaeological findings as gusuku. Takemoto Masahide claimed that gusuku were defensive communities. He classified what he considered gusuku into three types:

- A: residence of political leaders, a fortress/castle with stone walls,
- B: defensive community, and
- C: place of ancestor worship or burial place.

According to Takemoto, Type B, which is overwhelming in number, appeared during the transitional period between primitive society and class society. As noted by Asato Susumu, there is a significant gap in the use of the term gusuku. While Nakamatsu referred to limited space as gusuku, Takamoto applied the term to the whole archaeological site.

Archaeologist Tōma Shiichi hypothesized that a gusuku was the residence of an aji (local ruler or warlord) and his family. Since most gusuku in the Okinawa Islands are accompanied with stone walls, he considered that the Gusuku Period was characterized by the formation of class society. Among archaeologists, however, Kokubu Naoichi supported Nakamatsu's theory considering poor living conditions of gusuku. Asato Susumu expressed concern about the association of gusuku with class society because the emergence of political rulers was not well attested by archaeological findings but mostly based on literature that was written centuries later.

Folklorist Kojima Yoshiyuki was also a supporter of the sacredness theory. However, he opposed to Nakamatsu's theory about the origin of gusuku as a burial place. He argued that the word gusuku originally meant stonework. Separately of this, local communities handed down mountain cult, which shared roots with that of Yakushima and by extension Japan. Some sacred mountains were later fortified with stone walls, and as a result, gusuku came to mean castles/fortresses.

In any case, a flood of archaeological discoveries in the 1970s led Okinawan archaeologists to establish archaeological periods of the Okinawa Islands that were distinct from those of Japan (Amami and the Sakishima group also have unique archaeological periods distinct from Japan and one another). In their framework, the Gusuku period is an archaeological epoch of the Okinawa Islands, which they consider was characterized by the widespread appearance of gusuku, the widespread use of iron, and farming. It follows the Shell Mound period and precedes the Sanzan period. It is parallel with the late Heian to Muromachi periods of Japan. Also, the beginning of the Gusuku period corresponds to that of the Old Ryukyu period of Okinawan historiography, both beginning in 1187 with the semi-legendary ascension of King Shunten.

Takanashi Osamu, an Amami-based archaeologist, criticized the trend of Okinawan archaeology. The Gusuku period lacked clear markers of dating from an archaeological perspective. Pottery seriation, in particular, remained poorly understood. The contemporaneousness of stone walls and excavated potteries was not established. He also noted a bias of Okinawan archaeologists, who he thought were preoccupied with questions of how the Okinawa-centered kingdom of Ryukyu was formed.

While typical castle/fortress-type gusuku in the Okinawa Islands were featured by stone walls, it was discovered in the 1980s and 90s that some fortifications in northern Okinawa Island lacked stone walls but instead were characterized by earthworks, kuruwa and dry moats. This style of fortifications is in fact rather common in Amami Ōshima and representative of medieval mountain fortifications (中世山城) of Japan. Naka Shōhachirō and Chinen Isamu, a historian and an archaeologist from Okinawa dated them to the late 12th to early 13th centuries and claimed that they were predecessors of gusuku with stone walls. This view was actively criticized by Takanashi Osamu in the late 1990s and 2000s.

=== Sakishima Islands ===
Archaeological studies in the Sakishima Islands in southern Ryukyu are not so active as those in the main Okinawa Islands. Some Okinawa-led archaeological reports labeled some sites in Miyako and Yaeyama as "gusuku-like." Archaeologist Ono Masatoshi raised concern about the naïve application of the Okinawan gusuku-as-fortifications framework and urged that scholars should not turn a blind eye to the diversified nature of archaeological sites with stone walls in these islands. Few gusuku sites can be attributed to the fact that the Sakishima Islands were over a hundred years behind Okinawa socially and technologically. In 1500, Ryukyu invaded and annexed the islands, which would have limited further local gusuku development. The primary gusuku site in Yaeyama is Furusutobaru Castle, residence of Oyake Akahachi, which was attacked by Nakasone Toyomiya of Miyako shortly before the invasion by Ryukyu.

Linguist Nakamoto Masachie noted that in some dialects of Yaeyama, gusuku/gushiku means stone walls themselves (not a structure with stone walls) and conjectured that this might be the original meaning of gusuku. According to Ono Masatoshi, gusuku has various meanings, depending on dialects of Yaeyama, including a partition of a mansion and stone walls surrounding an agricultural field. Nakamatsu Yashū claimed that suku-like word forms were more prominent in Miyako and Yaeyama than gusuku.

Regardless of whether it is appropriate to call them gusuku, the Yaeyama Islands have archaeological remains with stone walls, such as Mashuku Village of Hateruma Island, Hanasuku and Gumaara Villages and Shinzato Villages of Taketomi Island. These villages were abandoned around the time of the conquest by the Ryukyu Kingdom. What are common to these villages are that they were located on top of cliffs, divided by inhomogeneous cell blocks and lacked roads. The whole village and each cell block were surrounded by stone walls. This type of abandoned settlement can also be found on Miyako Island but they are rather exceptional. The local people call these remains busu nu yashiki (bushi's mansion), busu nu yaa ishigaki (bushi's house's stone walls) or busu nu yaa (bushi's house), busu nu yama (bushi's mountain) in Ishigaki, bushin yaa (bushi's house) in Hatoma, nishi nu bushi nu yaa (bushi's house in the north) in Aragusuku.

In the archaeology of Yaeyama, human settlements prior to the conquest by Ryukyu are called "Suku Villages" because the names of these ruins have the suffix -suku. By extension, the archaeological epoch of the Suku Culture (11–16th centuries) is sometimes used by archaeologists.

=== Amami Islands ===
Formal studies of gusuku in the Amami Islands group in southern Kagoshima Prefecture were started by Nakamatsu Yashū in the 1960s and 70s. He revealed that most of what were called gusuku by local communities of Amami were by no means fortifications. He also noted that Amami had -suku toponyms, which were otherwise considered specific to Miyako and Yaeyama. However, his study on Amami went largely unnoticed.

In the 1980s and 90s, Miki Yasushi, an expert of medieval mountain fortifications of Japan, extended his research to the Amami Islands, largely independently of Okinawan archaeology. His comprehensive study found 129 gusuku toponyms in Amami Ōshima. Similarly, a 1982 research project by Kagoshima Prefecture covered 45 fortifications in Amami. Miki carefully noted that, as Nakamatsu had shown, most of what were called gusuku were not fortifications, and that conversely, some fortifications were not called gusuku by the locals. A major difference from those in the Okinawa Islands was that gusuku in Amami (except those in Okinoerabu and Yoron) nearly completely lacked stone walls. As a historian from Japan, Miki took much notice of the religious nature of gusuku in Amami, which is completely absent from Japanese fortresses.

Publications from Amami gained attention of some Okinawan archaeologists in the 1980s and 90s, and they attempted to place Amami's gusuku in the Okinawan gusuku-as-fortifications framework. Naka Shōhachiro investigated some gusuku in Amami Ōshima and discovered kuruwa and dry moats there. He claimed that the primary function of those gusuku was defensiveness, not religiousness as Nakamatsu claimed. He dated them to the late 12th to early 13th centuries and considered that they subsequently evolved into those with stone walls in Okinawa. By contrast, Miki conjectured that the construction of these fortifications was triggered by repeated invasion by the Ryukyu Kingdom in the 15th and 16th centuries.

In his survey of earlier studies, Takanashi Osamu criticized Naka's theory because his dating lacked evidence. In fact, gusuku with established dates were mostly from the 14th to 16th centuries. While other archaeologists had focused on mountain fortifications, he paid attention to gusuku in flat land. He also indicated the possible presence of gusuku in the Tokara Islands, which are located to the north of Amami.

From 1995 to 2000, a comprehensive investigation of gusuku was conducted in Naze (merged into the city of Amami in 2006) of northern Amami Ōshima. This project initially relied on gusuku toponyms to find archaeological remains but discovered far more remains in the mountains than expected. Among 45 sites discovered, only five had gusuku toponyms. This suggests that these sites were not gusuku in origin and that some of them were later transformed into gusuku. The toponymic survey also found that some earlier archaeological reports had labeled gusuku even though the referents were not called gusuku by locals. As a result, so-called "Uragami Gusuku", for example, was renamed to "Uragami-Arimori site."

Earlier studies pointed to the similarity between gusuku in Amami, northern Okinawa Island and medieval mountain fortifications of Japan. Takanashi went further claiming that these fortifications were indeed medieval mountain fortifications. He considered the possibility that there were gaps in time among (1) the beginning of the archaeological sites, (2) the construction of defensive structures and (3) the applications of the name of gusuku. He re-evaluated Nakamatsu's sacredness theory and presented a working hypothesis that gusuku in Amami were of secondary origin, possibly related to the introduction of the noro priestess system by the Ryukyu Kingdom.

== List of castle/fortress-type gusuku ==
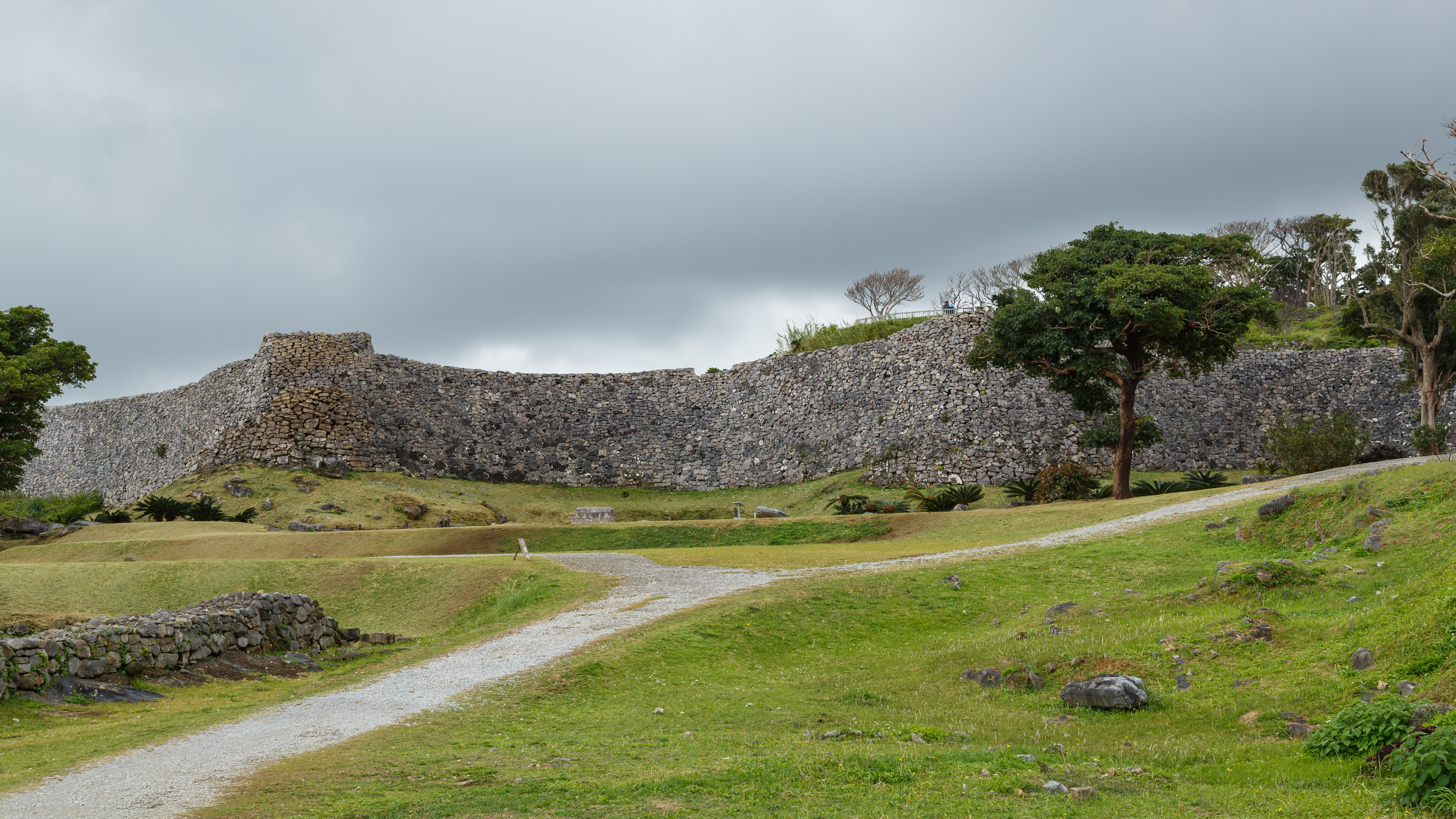
Nakijin Castle in northern Okinawa

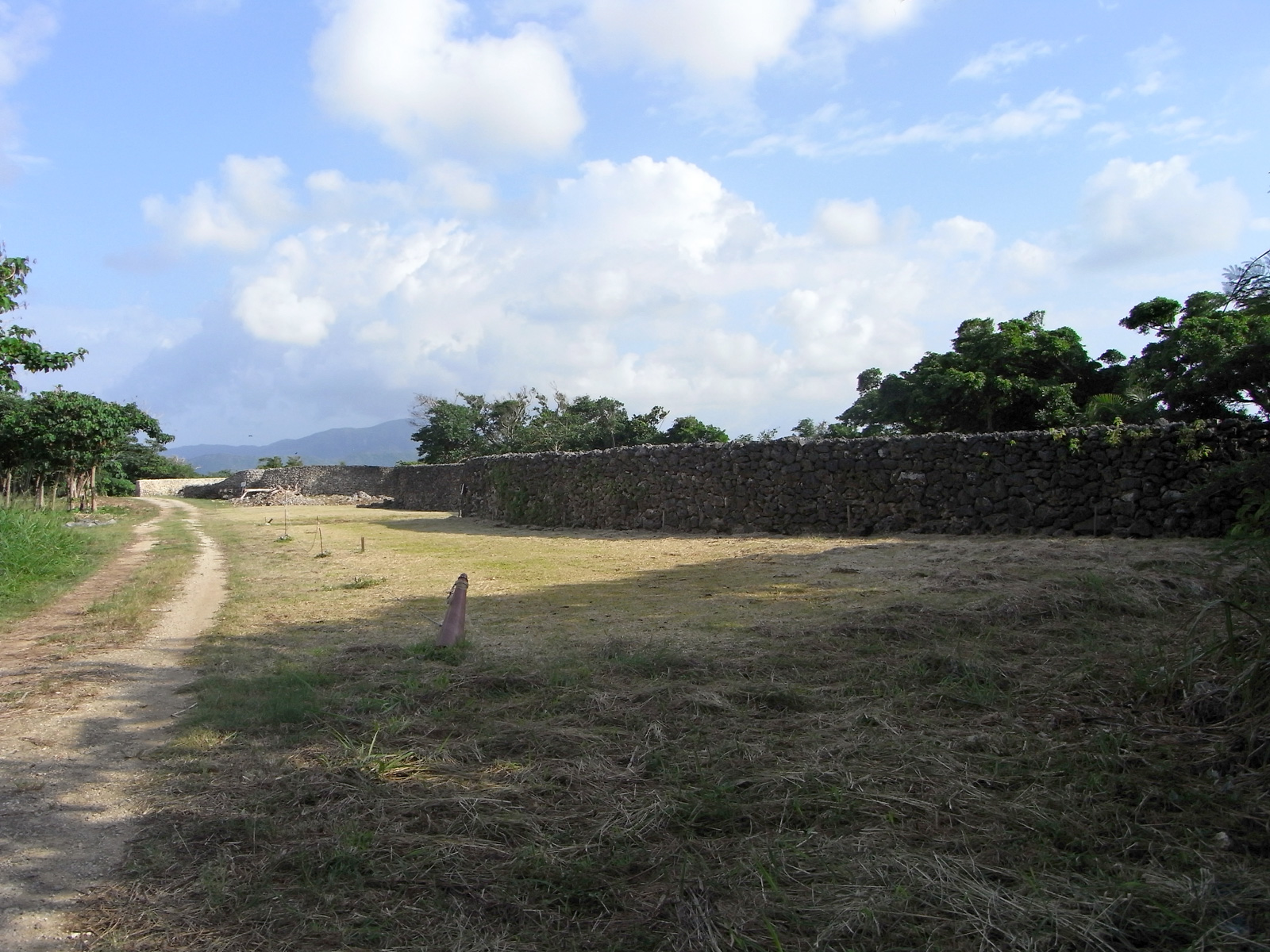
Furusutobaru Castle on Ishigaki Island

=== Amami Islands ===
- Amami (Akagina Castle – Ruins; Beru Castle – Ruins; Ishihara Castle – Ruins; Yononushi Castle – Ruins)

=== Okinawa Islands ===
- Ikei (Ikei Castle – Ruins)
- Izena (Izena Castle – Ruins)
- Kume (Chinaha Castle – Ruins; Gushikawa Castle (Kume) – Ruins; Suhara Castle – Ruins; Tunnaha Castle – Ruins; Uegusuku Castle (Kume) – Ruins)
- Okinawa (Agena Castle – Ruins; Chibana Castle – Ruins: Chinen Castle – Ruins; Gushikawa Castle (Itoman) – Ruins; Iha Castle – Ruins; Iso Castle – Ruins; Itokazu Castle – Ruins; Kakinohana Castle – Ruins; Katsuren Castle – Partially reconstructed; Kin Castle – Demolished; Komesu Castle – Ruins; Kyan Castle – Ruins; Mie Castle – Ruins; Nago Castle – Ruins; Nakagusuku Castle – Partially reconstructed; Nakijin Castle – Ruins; Nanzan Castle – Ruins; Ōzato Castle – Ruins; Sashiki Castle – Ruins; Shuri Castle – Mostly reconstructed; Tamagusuku Castle – Ruins; Tomigusuku Castle – Ruins; Uegusuku Castle (Tomigusuku) – Ruins; Urasoe Castle – Partially reconstructed; Yamada Castle – Ruins; Yarazamori Castle – Demolished; Zakimi Castle – Partially reconstructed)

=== Sakishima Islands ===
- Hateruma (Shimotabaru Castle – Ruins)
- Ishigaki (Furusutobaru Castle – Ruins)
- Miyako (Kubaka Castle – Ruins; Takausu Castle – Ruins; Temaka Castle – Ruins; Ufutaki Castle – Ruins)

== See also ==
- Gusuku period
- Mount Gusuku
- Historic Sites of Okinawa
- Japanese castle
- Chashi
- Ryukyuan architecture

== Works cited ==
- Hokama, Shūzen (1995). 沖縄古語大辞典 [Dictionary of Archaic Okinawan]. Tokyo: Kadokawa.
