= Furusutobaru Castle =

Castle in Ishigaki, Okinawa, Japan

Coordinates: 24°21′1.73″N 124°11′43.8″E

Furusutobaru Castle フルスト原城
- Ishigaki, Okinawa
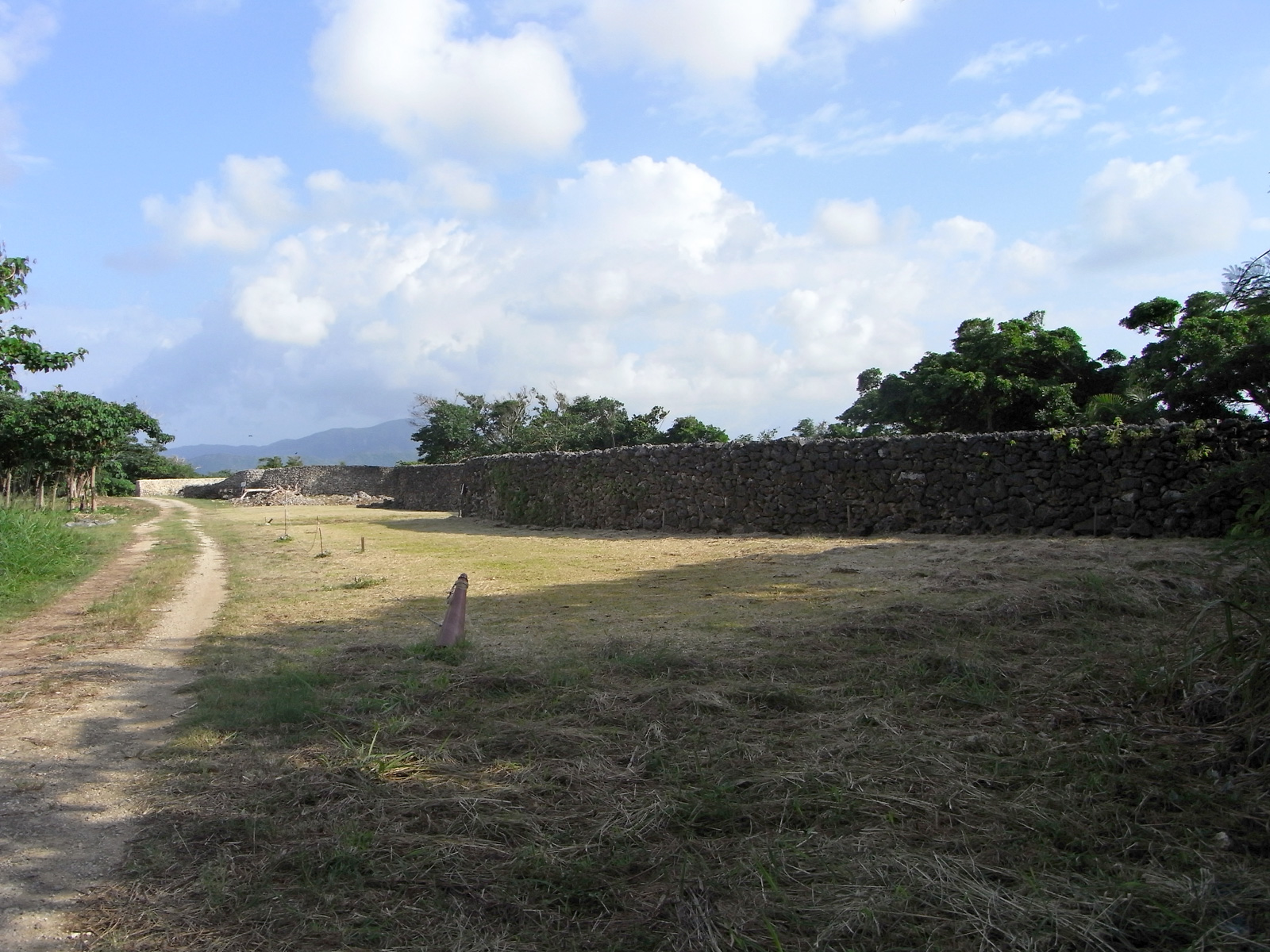

Site information
- Type: Gusuku
- Open to the public: yes
- Condition: Ruins

Location
- Location within Okinawa Prefecture Location within Japan

Site history
- In use: 15th century–1500
- Materials: Ryukyuan limestone, wood
- Battles/wars: Attacked by Nakasone Toyomiya (1500)

Garrison information
- Occupants: Oyake Akahachi

Furusutobaru Castle (フルスト原城, Furusutobaru jō) are the ruins of stone ramparts that were thought to have been a Ryukyuan gusuku fortification, but are now thought to have been a residence site, as many household items have been excavated but no weapons have been found. Located in the city of Ishigaki, Okinawa, it was designated a National Historic Sites in 1978.

== History ==
The Furustobaru Ruins are located in the Ohama district of southern Ishigaki Island. Overlooking Miyara Bay, the site sits on the eastern side of a hill approximately 25 meters above sea level. Surrounded by a stone wall made of piled coralline limestone (Ryukyu limestone), 15 stone walls, ancient tombs, and remains of a sacred site have been identified. Fragments of Chinese ceramics and Yaeyama ware have also been excavated from the site. The ruins have long been assumed to be the residence of Oyake Akahachi, whose powerful clan that ruled the Yaeyama Islands in the 15th century and based his base in Ohama. Akahachi was from the neighboring island of Hateruma, and through strength and charisma, he managed to convince the other chieftains Yaeyama Islands to follow him in a revolt in 1500 against payment of tribute to the Ryukyu Kingdom. When this news came to Naha, the King Shō Shin commanded the ruler of Miyako Island, Nakasone Toyomiya to invade and suppress of Yaeyama. Miyako's forces landed in Miyara Bay in 1500. Akahachi was killed, and Nakasone would go on to conquer the rest of Yaeyama Islands. Although there is no historical evidence that the Furustohara ruins were Oyake Akahachi's castle, but since no other fortifications have been discovered in the Ohama area where Oyake Akahachi is said to have lived, and the description in the Ryukyu Kingdom history book "Kyūyō" that Oyake Akahachi set up camp "backed by steep cliffs and facing the ocean" fits the Furustohara ruins, it is considered quite possible. Archaeological excavations have dated the ruins to between the 14th and late 16th centuries, so it is known that the ruins existed before the late 15th century, when Oyake Akahachi was active.

=== Condition ===
The site sits on a ridge overlooking Miyara Bay. There are 15 walled enclosures, a few of which have been excavated. Finds include local pottery, white porcelain and celadon from China, and the bones of horses and cows.

Much of the site was damaged when stones were removed during World War II to fill bomb craters at the neighboring Ishigakijima South Naval Airfield (commonly known as Heidoku Airfield, later becoming the former Ishigaki Airport). Excavations uncovered the foundations of the stonework, and conservation and restoration work began in 1992, restoring seven of the 15 stonework structures to a height of 6 to 7 feet, which is the height as remembered by local elders.

== See also ==
- List of Historic Sites of Japan (Okinawa)
