= Suhara Castle =

Suhara Castle 塩原城
- Kumejima, Okinawa

Site information
- Type: Gusuku
- Controlled by: Ryūkyū Kingdom (16th century–1879); Empire of Japan (1879–1945); United States Military Government of the Ryukyu Islands(1945-1950); United States Civil Administration of the Ryukyu Islands(1950-1972); Japan(1972-present)
- Open to the public: yes
- Condition: Ruins

Site history
- Materials: Ryukyuan limestone, wood

Suhara Castle (塩原城, Suhara jō) is a Ryukyuan gusuku in Kumejima, Okinawa, on Kume Island. Now a set of ruins high in the mountains, it was built on a hill overlooking Eef beach.
