= Kubaka Castle =

Ryukyuan gusuku in Miyakojima, Okinawa

Coordinates: 24.730904°N 125.299957°E

Kubaka Castle 久場嘉城
- Miyakojima, Okinawa
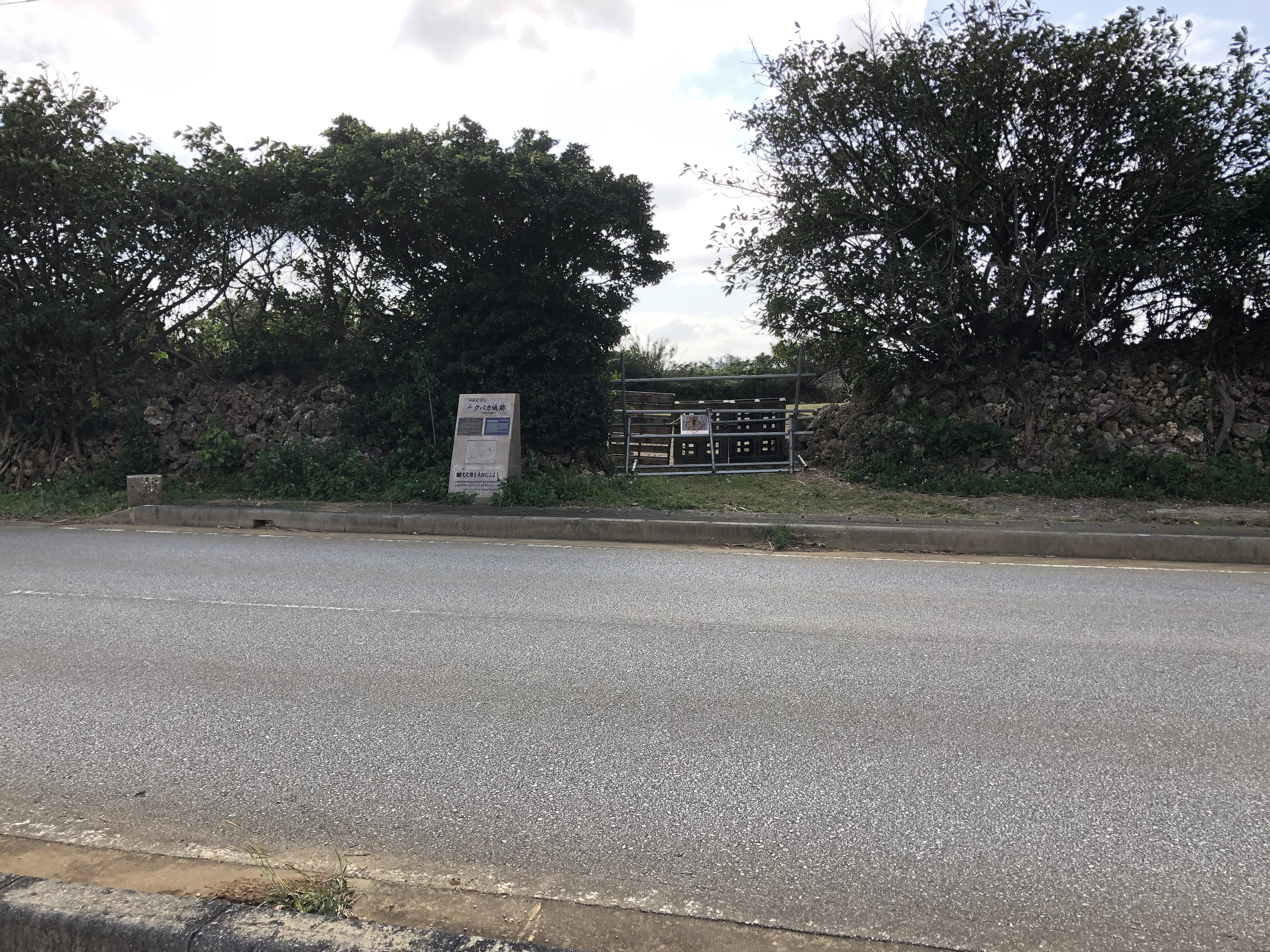
- Main gate of Kubaka Castle

Site information
- Type: Gusuku
- Owner: Private owner
- Controlled by: Ryūkyū Kingdom (~1500–1879); Empire of Japan (1879–1945); United States Military Government of the Ryukyu Islands (1945–1950); United States Civil Administration of the Ryukyu Islands(1950–1972); Japan (1972–present)
- Open to the public: Exterior only
- Condition: Ruins

Location

Site history
- Built: before 16th century
- Built by: Kubaka Aji
- In use: before 16th century-18th century
- Materials: Ryukyuan limestone, wood

Garrison information
- Occupants: Kubaka Aji, Fumon Koujin

Kubaka Castle (久場嘉城, Kubaka jō; Okinawan: Kubaka Gushiku) is a Ryukyuan gusuku located near the shore of Irie Bay in southern Miyakojima, Okinawa, in former Ueno Village. It is the only castle on Miyako Island where the original castle layout is still visible.

== History ==
The castle was built sometime prior to the 16th century, ruled by the Aji of Kubaka. The castle was 56.4 metres (185 ft) long and 45.5 metres (149 ft) wide with the gate facing southwest.

There is a legend that a merchant from Ryukyu named Tamagusuku fell in love with Koujin, daughter of the Lord of Kubaka Castle, and the two had a son. After returning from a trip, Tamagusuku overheard Koujin refer to him as an “exile” or “wanderer” while talking to their son. He told her that he was an important trader, then grabbed the boy and took him to Okinawa where he would grow up to be a Lord himself. Koujin then wandered on the shore near the castle praying for death, until one day a tsunami washed her away.

== Gallery ==
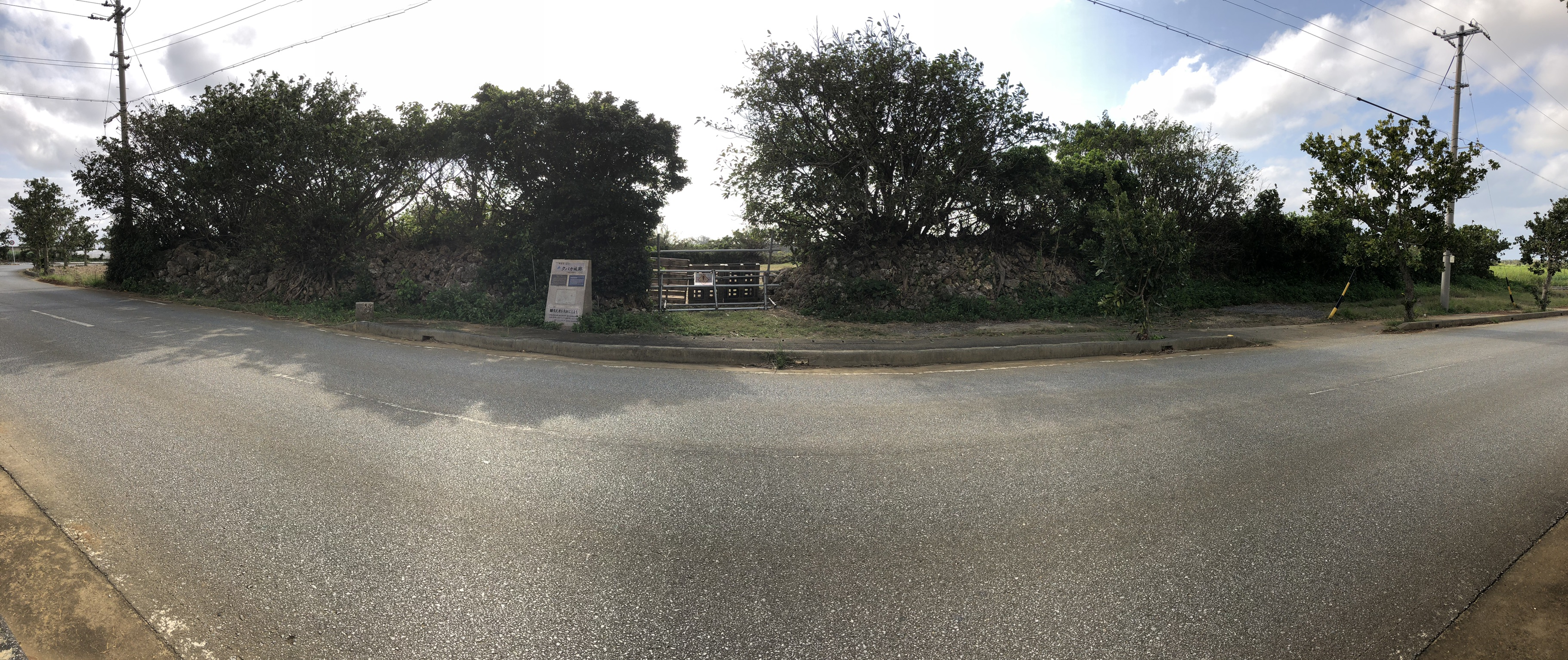
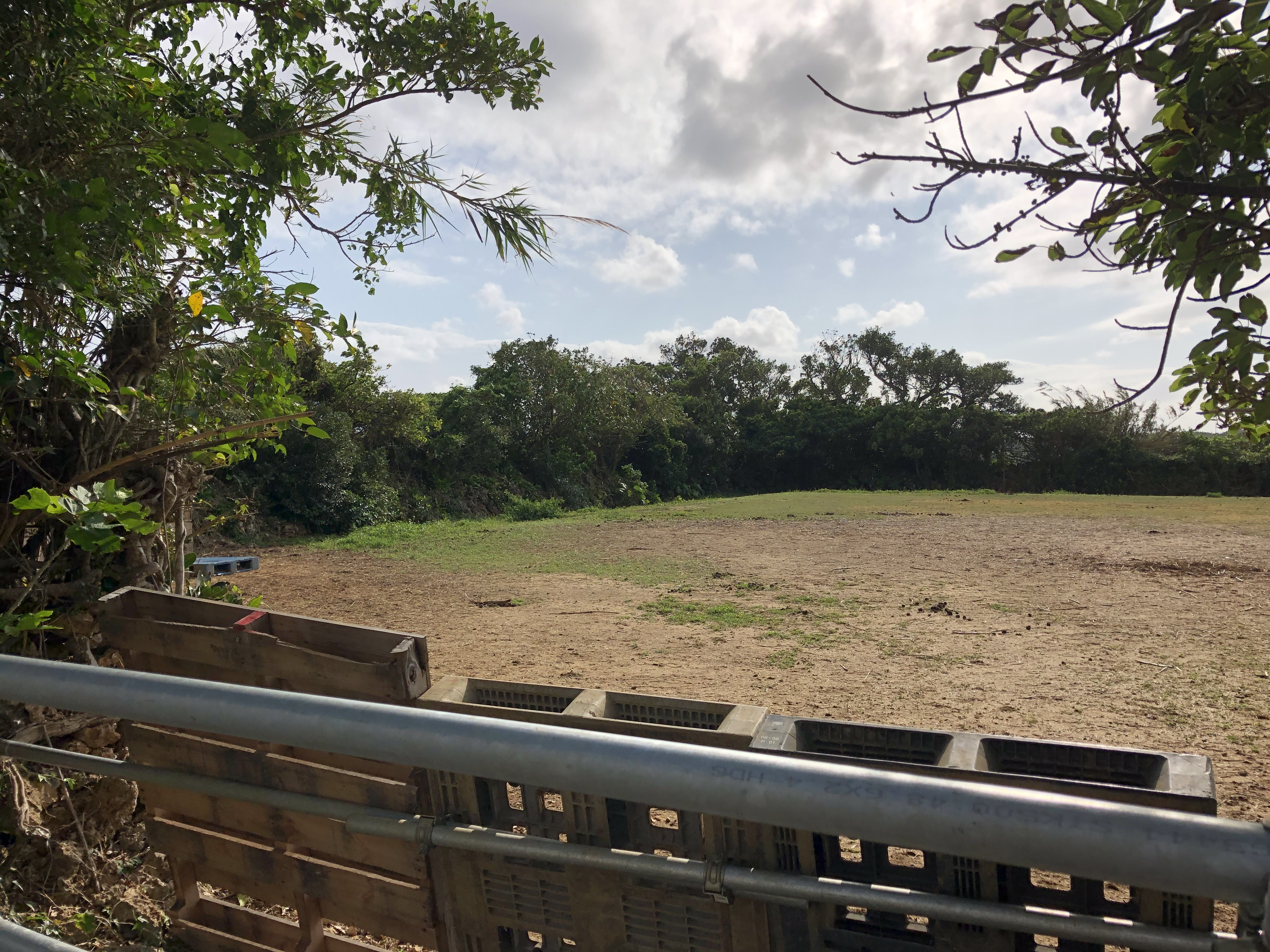

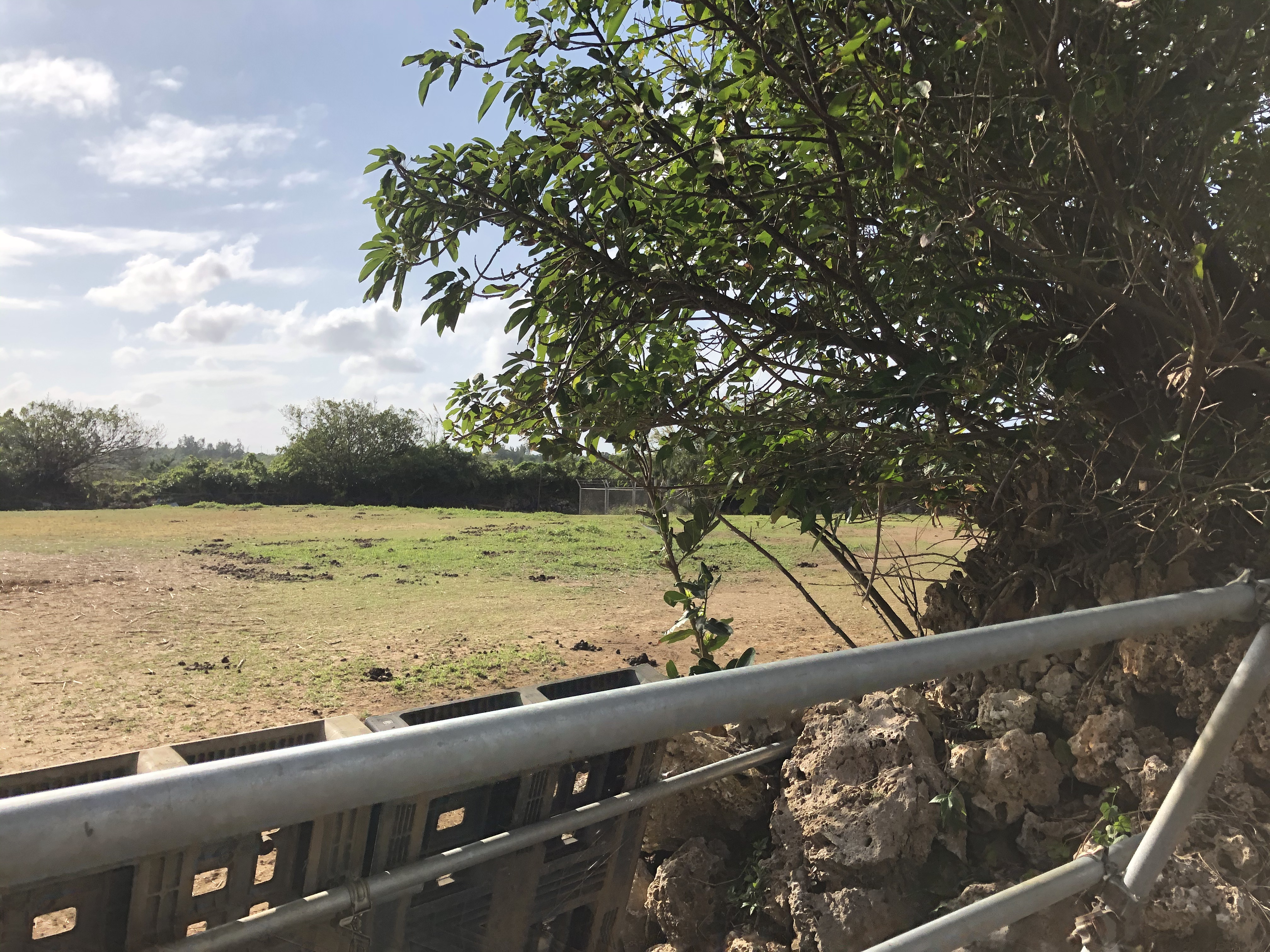
