= Chinaha Castle =

Chinaha Castle 伊敷索城
- Kumejima, Okinawa

Site information
- Type: Gusuku
- Controlled by: Ryūkyū Kingdom (16th century–1879); Empire of Japan (1879–1945); United States Military Government of the Ryukyu Islands(1945-1950); United States Civil Administration of the Ryukyu Islands(1950-1972); Japan(1972-present)
- Open to the public: yes
- Condition: Ruins

Location
- Coordinates: 26°20′32″N 126°45′39″E

Site history
- Materials: Ryukyuan limestone, wood

Chinaha Castle (伊敷索城, Chinaha jō), also known as Ishikinawa Castle, is a Ryukyuan gusuku in Kumejima, Okinawa, on Kume Island. It was built on a cliff to control the Shirase River.
