= Iha Castle =

Iha Castle 伊波城
- Uruma, Okinawa
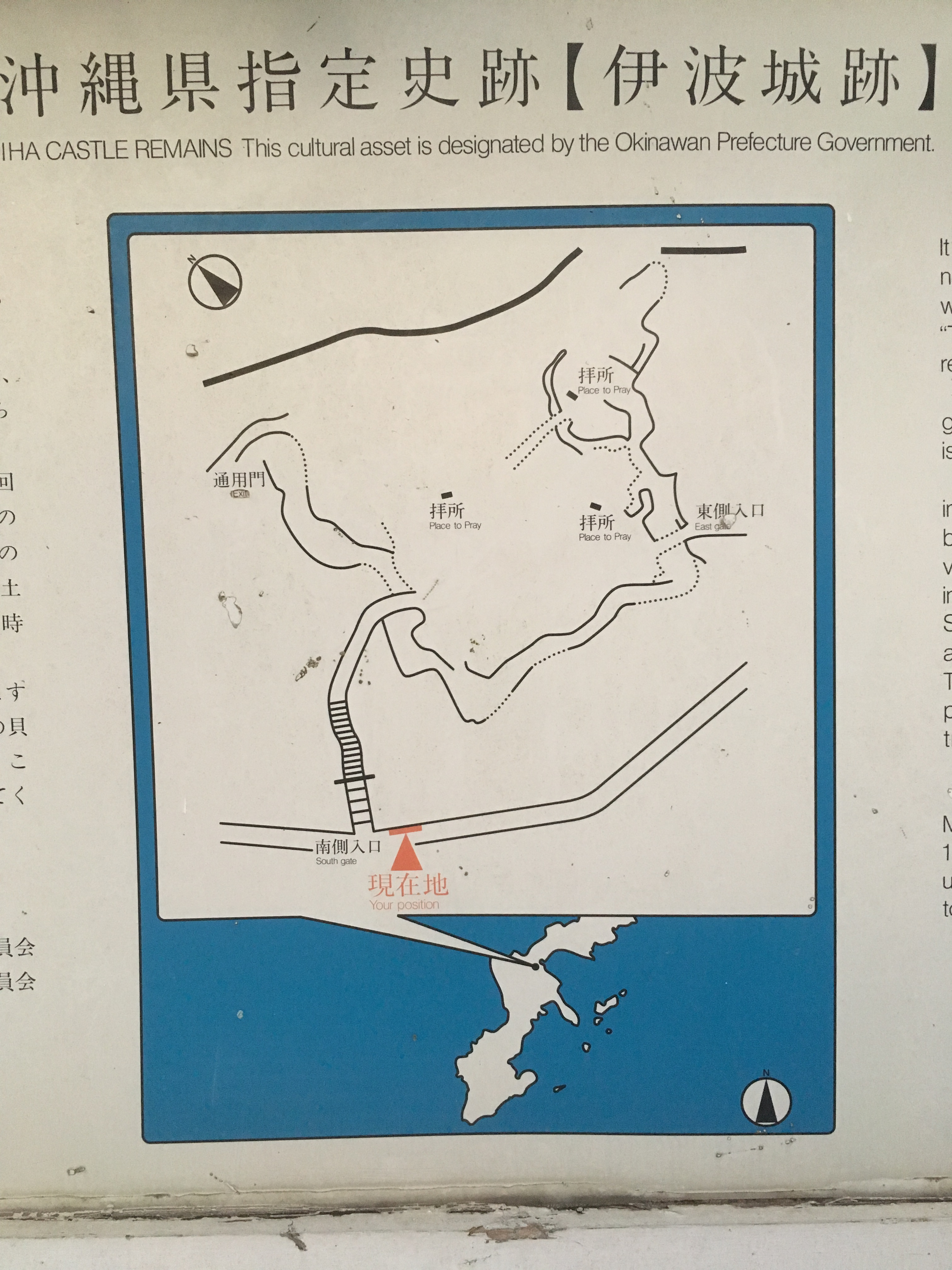
- Map of the Iha Castle site

Site information
- Type: Gusuku
- Controlled by: Ryūkyū Kingdom (15th century–1879); Empire of Japan (1879–1945); United States Military Government of the Ryukyu Islands(1945-1950); United States Civil Administration of the Ryukyu Islands(1950-1972); Japan(1972-present)
- Open to the public: yes
- Condition: Ruins

Location
- Coordinates: 26°25′18″N 127°49′02″E

Site history
- Built: early 14th century
- In use: early 14th century–15th century
- Materials: Ryukyuan limestone, wood

Garrison information
- Occupants: Aji of Misato Magiri

Iha Castle (伊波城, Iha jō; Okinawan: Ifa Gushiku) is a Ryukyuan gusuku in Uruma, Okinawa. It sits on a cliff that separates Iha from Ishikawa, with a grand view of the Ishikawa Isthmus. The castle is in ruins, with nothing left of the original structures save the walls. There are also multiple Ryukyuan shrines in the bailey. Based on artifacts found in and around the castle, it has been estimated to have been in use around the 13th to 15th centuries. The Okinawa Prefectural government erected a stone Torii in front of one of the castle gates, along with a plaque describing it.

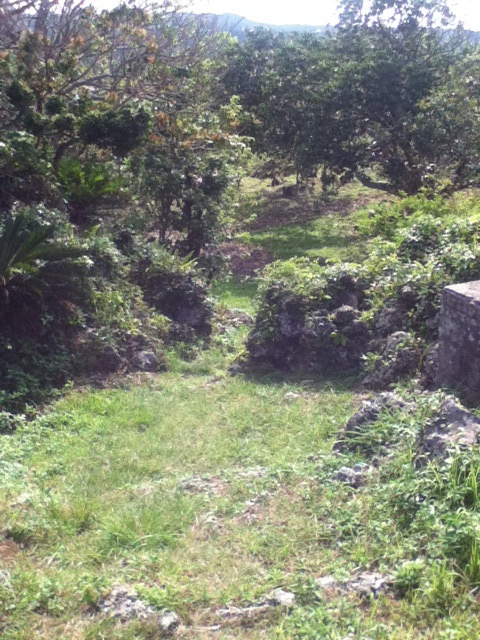
View of the bailey from a battlement.

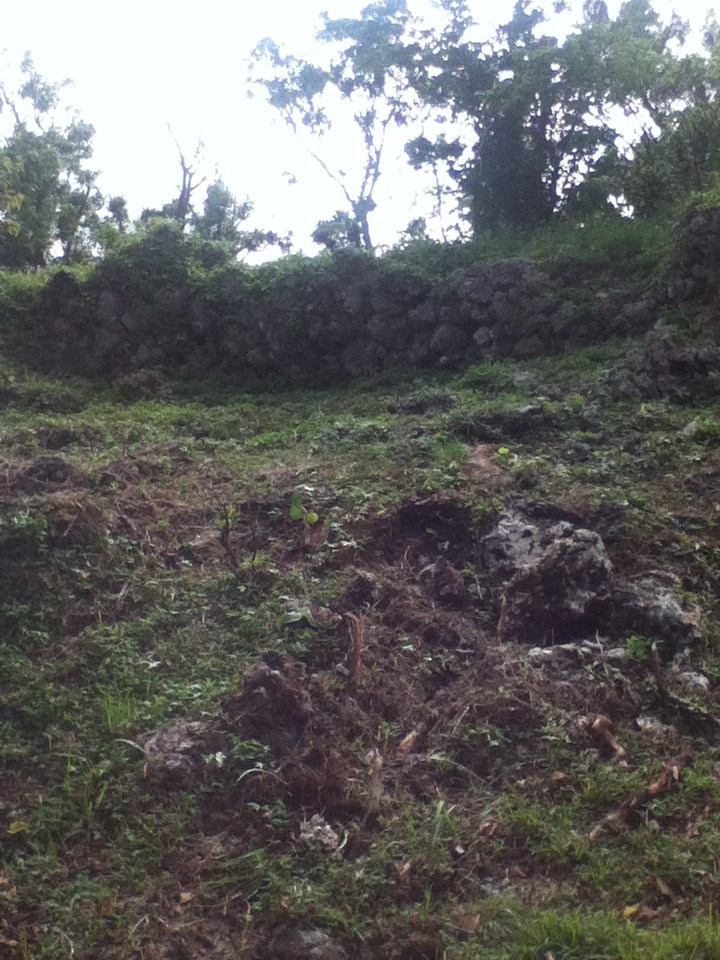
Bailey of Iha Castle.

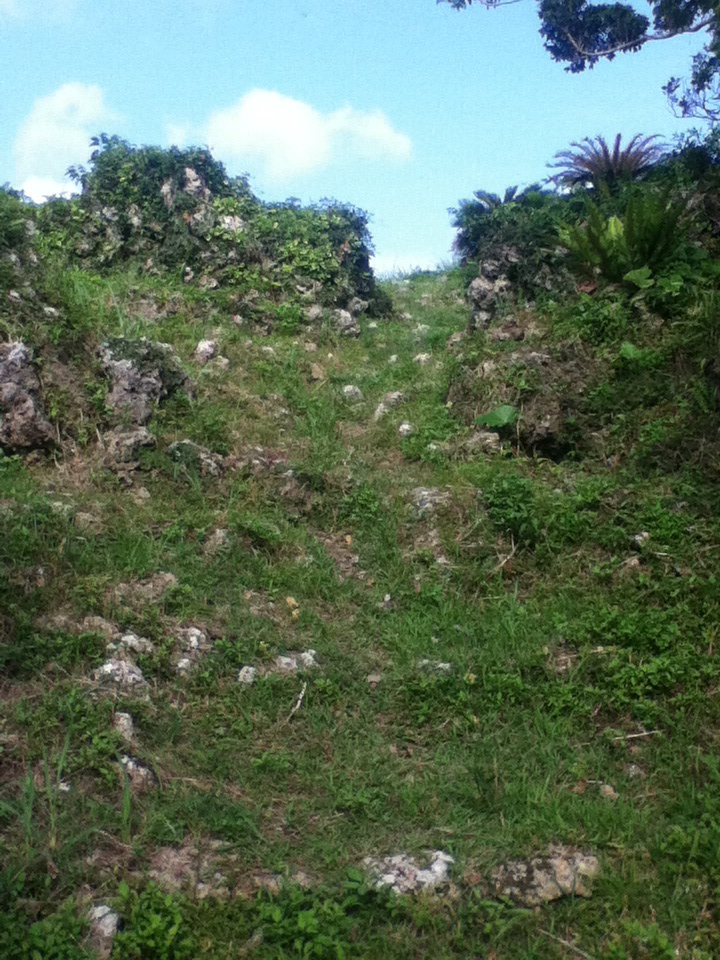
A battlement of Iha Castle.
