= Tomigusuku Castle =

Coordinates: 26.189238673746072°N 127.68503085560607°E

Tomigusuku Castle 豊見城城
- Tomigusuku, Okinawa

Site information
- Type: Gusuku
- Controlled by: Nanzan (1400?–1429); Ryūkyū Kingdom (1429–1879); Empire of Japan (1879–1945); United States Military Government of the Ryukyu Islands(1945-1950); United States Civil Administration of the Ryukyu Islands(1950-1972); Japan (1972-present)
- Open to the public: yes
- Condition: Ruins

Location
- Location within Okinawa Prefecture Location within Japan

Site history
- Built: 1400?
- Built by: Ououso
- In use: 1400?–early 17th century
- Materials: Ryukyuan limestone, wood
- Battles/wars: World War II: Battle of Okinawa (1945)

Garrison information
- Occupants: Ououso, King of Nanzan

Tomigusuku Castle (豊見城城, Tomigusuku jō; Okinawan: Tumigushiku) is a Ryukyuan gusuku in Tomigusuku, Okinawa. It was built in about 1400 by Ououso, then King of Nanzan, and is now a ruined castle. The castle is not far from Highway 58.

== World War II ==
During the Battle of Okinawa, much of the castle ruins were destroyed. In addition, 175 Japanese soldiers committed suicide near Tomigusuku Castle, rather than surrendering to the Allies.
