= Kyan Castle =

Kyan Castle 喜屋武城
- Uruma, Okinawa

Site information
- Type: Gusuku
- Controlled by: Ōgawa Aji (14th century-15th century); Ryūkyū Kingdom (15th century–1879); Empire of Japan (1879–1945); United States Military Government of the Ryukyu Islands(1945-1950); United States Civil Administration of the Ryukyu Islands(1950-1972); Japan(1972-present)
- Open to the public: yes
- Condition: Ruins

Location
- Coordinates: 26°21′13″N 127°51′00″E

Site history
- Built by: Fourth son of Ōgawa Aji
- Materials: Ryukyuan limestone, wood

Kyan Castle (喜屋武城, Kyan jō; Okinawan: Chan Gushiku) is a Ryukyuan gusuku in Uruma, Okinawa. It was controlled by the Ōgawa Aji of Agena Castle until it was destroyed by the Ryukyu Kingdom.
