= Tunnaha Castle =

Tunnaha Castle 登武那覇城
- Kumejima, Okinawa
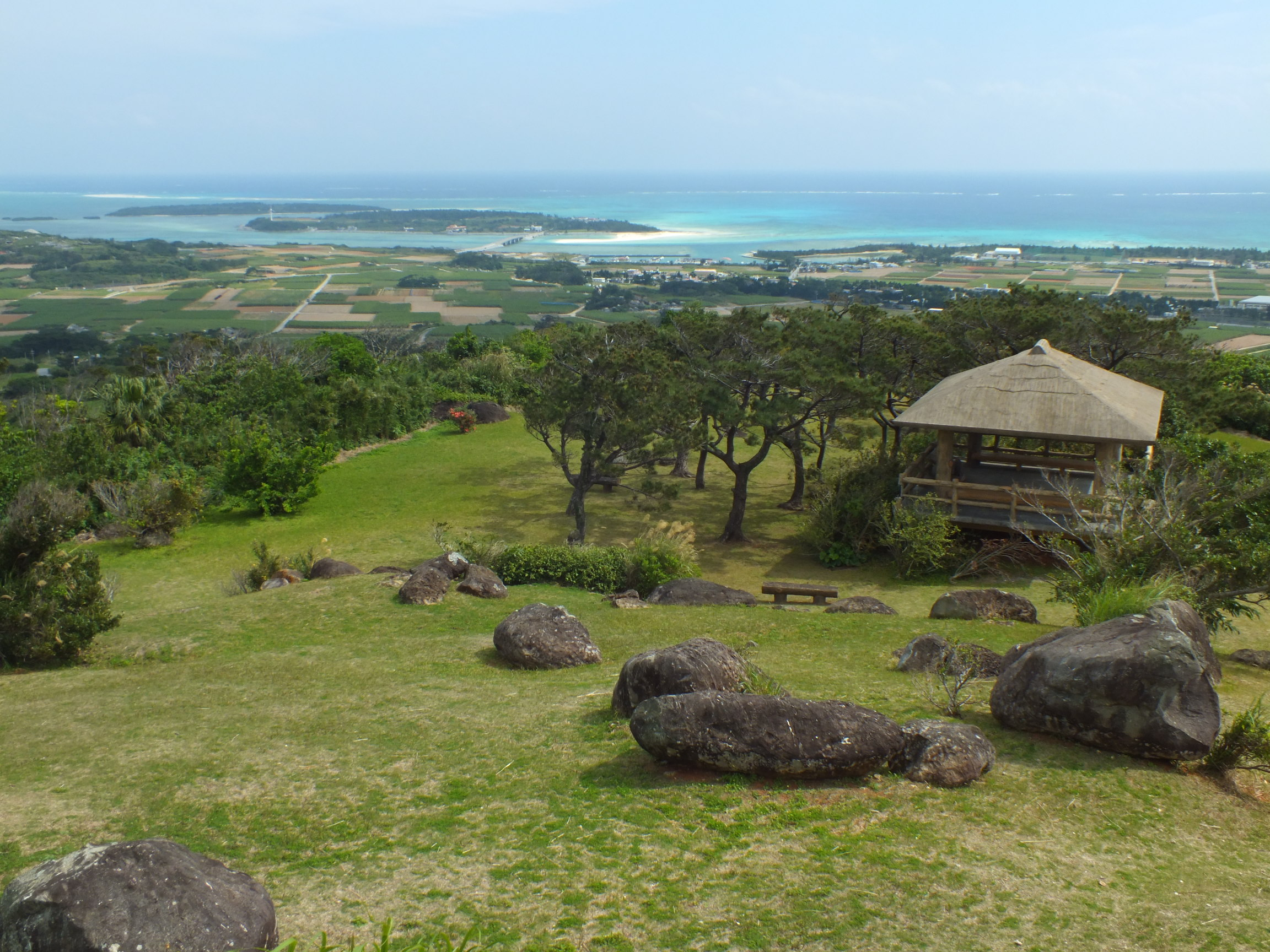

Site information
- Type: Gusuku
- Controlled by: Ryūkyū Kingdom (16th century–1879); Empire of Japan (1879–1945); United States Military Government of the Ryukyu Islands(1945-1950); United States Civil Administration of the Ryukyu Islands(1950-1972); Japan(1972-present)
- Open to the public: yes
- Condition: Ruins

Site history
- Materials: Ryukyuan limestone, wood

Tunnaha Castle (登武那覇城, Tunnaha jō) is a Ryukyuan gusuku in Kumejima, Okinawa, on Kume Island. It is located in Tunnaha Forest Park on a high hill.
