= Shimotabaru Castle =

Ryukyuan gusuku in Taketomi, Okinawa Prefecture

Shimotabaru Castle 下田原城
- Taketomi, Okinawa
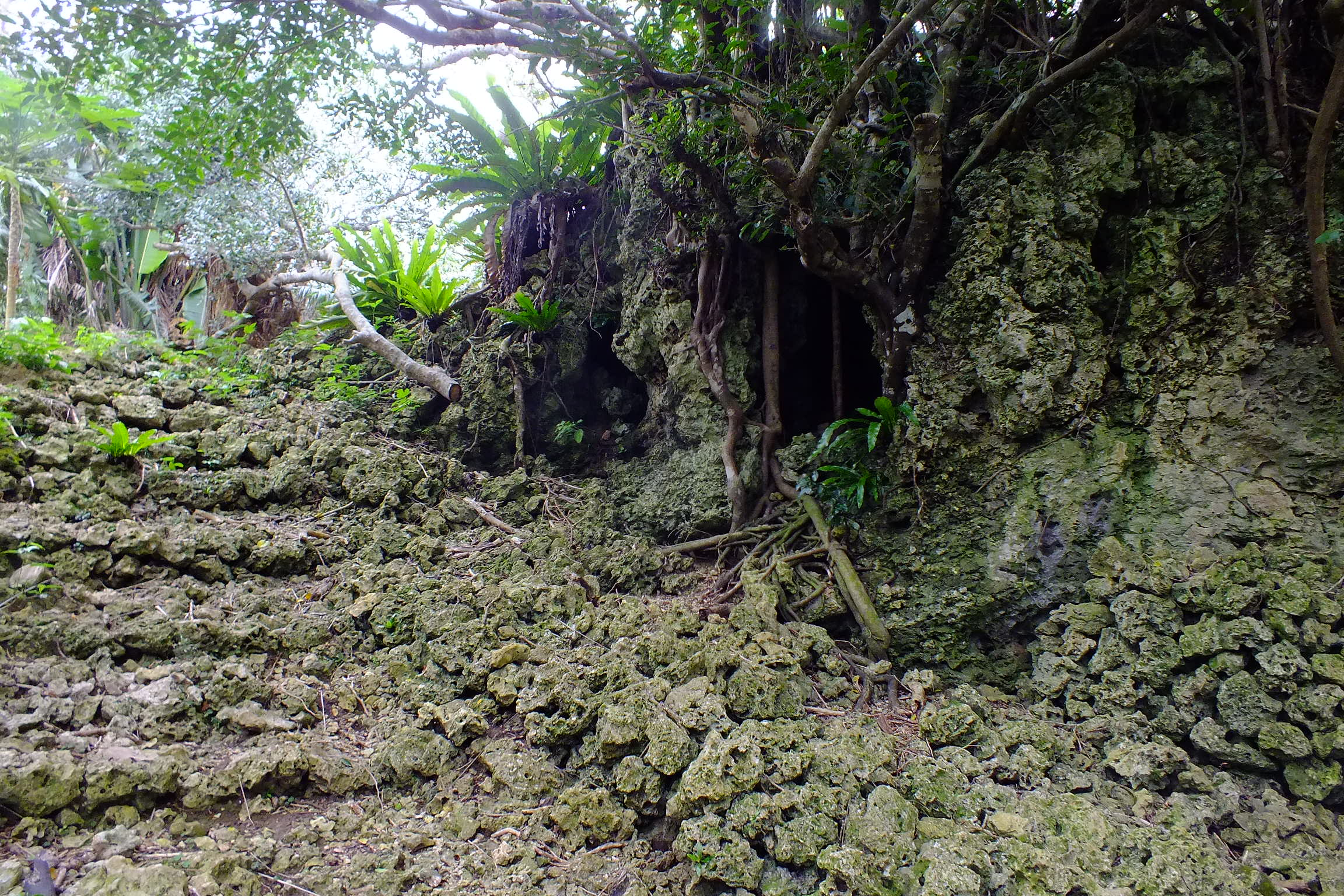
- Shimotabaru Castle and Buribuchi Park

Site information
- Type: Gusuku
- Open to the public: Yes
- Condition: Ruins

Location
- Coordinates: 24°4′8.6″N 123°46′41.1″E

Site history
- Built: 15th-16th century
- Materials: Ryukyuan limestone, wood
- National Historic Site of Japan

Shimotabaru Castle (下田原城, Shimotabaru-jō) is a Ryukyuan gusuku fortification located on Hateruma Island in the Yaeyama Islands (Taketomi, Okinawa Prefecture). Nanjō, Okinawa. The castle ruins were designated a National Historic Site in 2003.

== History ==
Around the end of the 12th century, the development of increased trade with Song Dynasty China and other countries led to the emergence of a ruling class. Many warlords ruled over the Yaeyama Islands until the Oyake Akahachi Rebellion, led by Oyake Akahachi, a native of Hateruma Island, brought the islands under the control of the Ryukyu Kingdom in 1500. Although small in size, Hateruma Island is dotted with fortification ruins and other remains believed to date from this period. One such example is Shimotabaru Castle, located on a cliff about 25 meters above sea level near Odomari Beach in the northern part of the island. Based on the discovery of Chinese celadon ware fragments dating from the 15th to 16th centuries, Shimotabaru Castle is believed to have been built around this time, but the exact date and who built it are unknown.

Shimotabaru Castle measures 150 meters east-to-west and 100 meters north-to-south. Surrounded by cliff walls made of piling coral limestone, it comprises eight enclosures. Remains of observation decks, stone chambers, wells, and other structures also remain. As it escaped damage in World War II, the ruins are in good condition; however, it has suffered from lack of maintenance and long exposure to the tropical elements.

It is about a 15-minute walk from Hateruma Port.

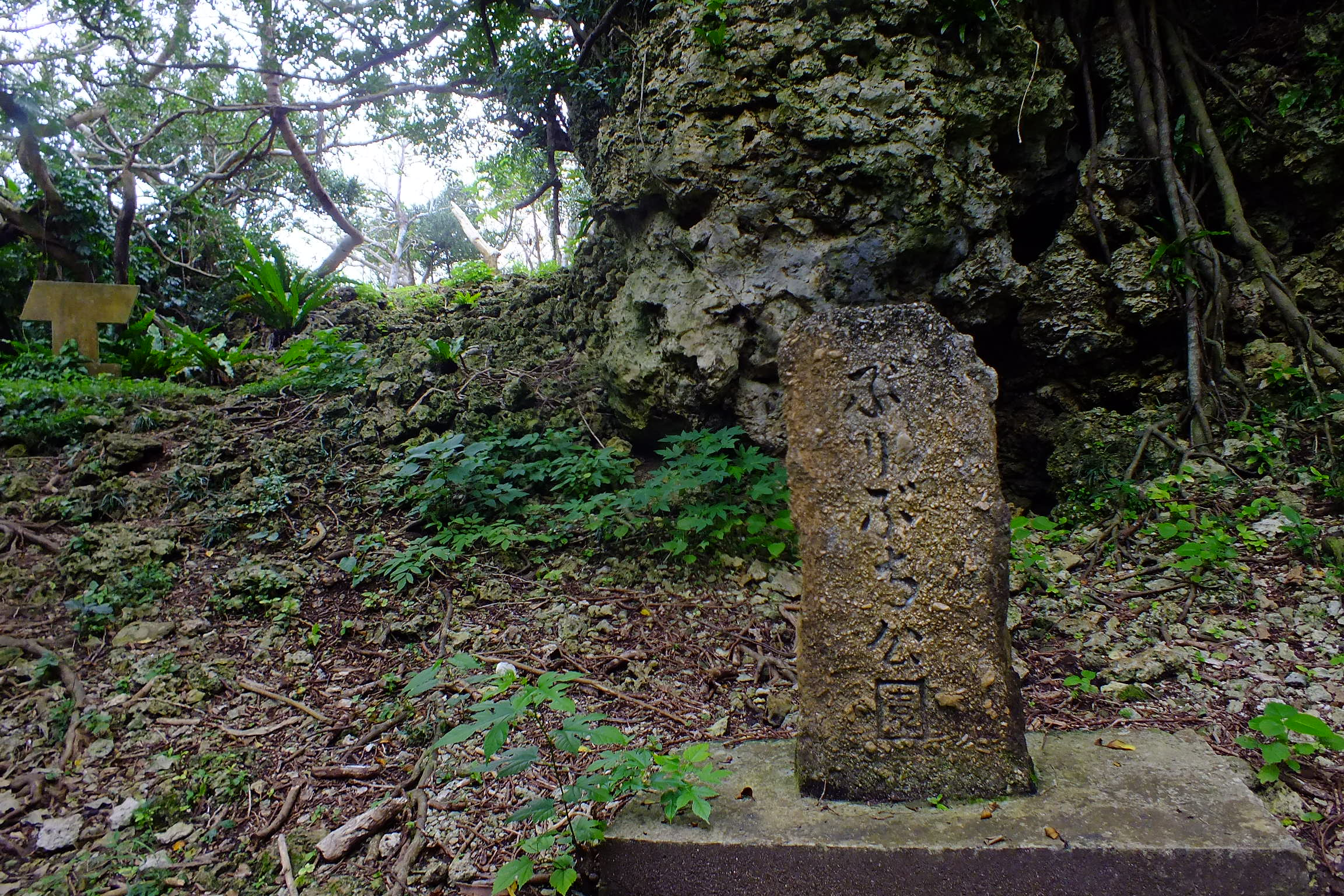
Near the entrance where the stone monument for "Buribuchi Park" stands.

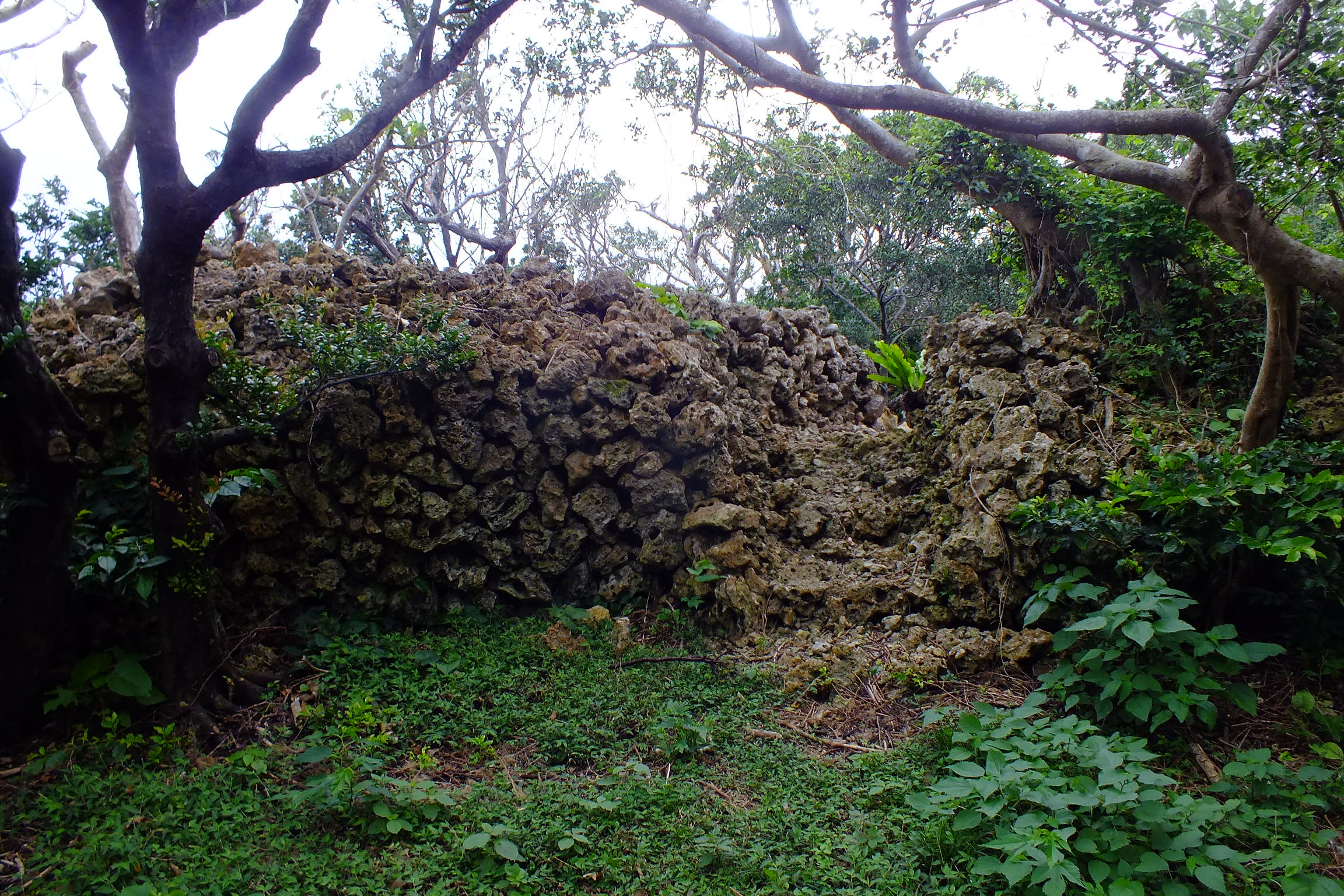
Castle walls constructed from piled coral limestone.。

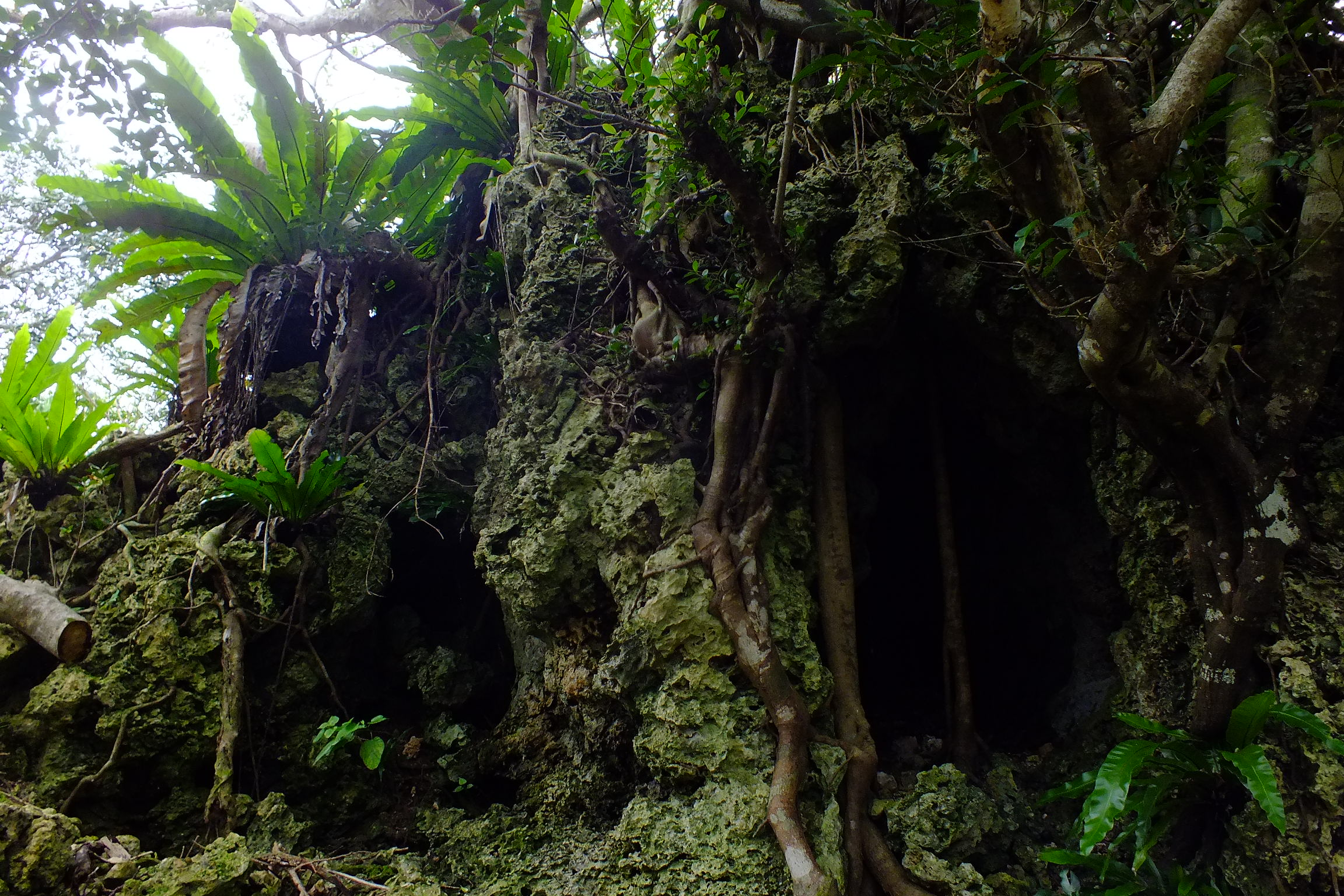
Castle ruins covered in coral reefs and vegetation.

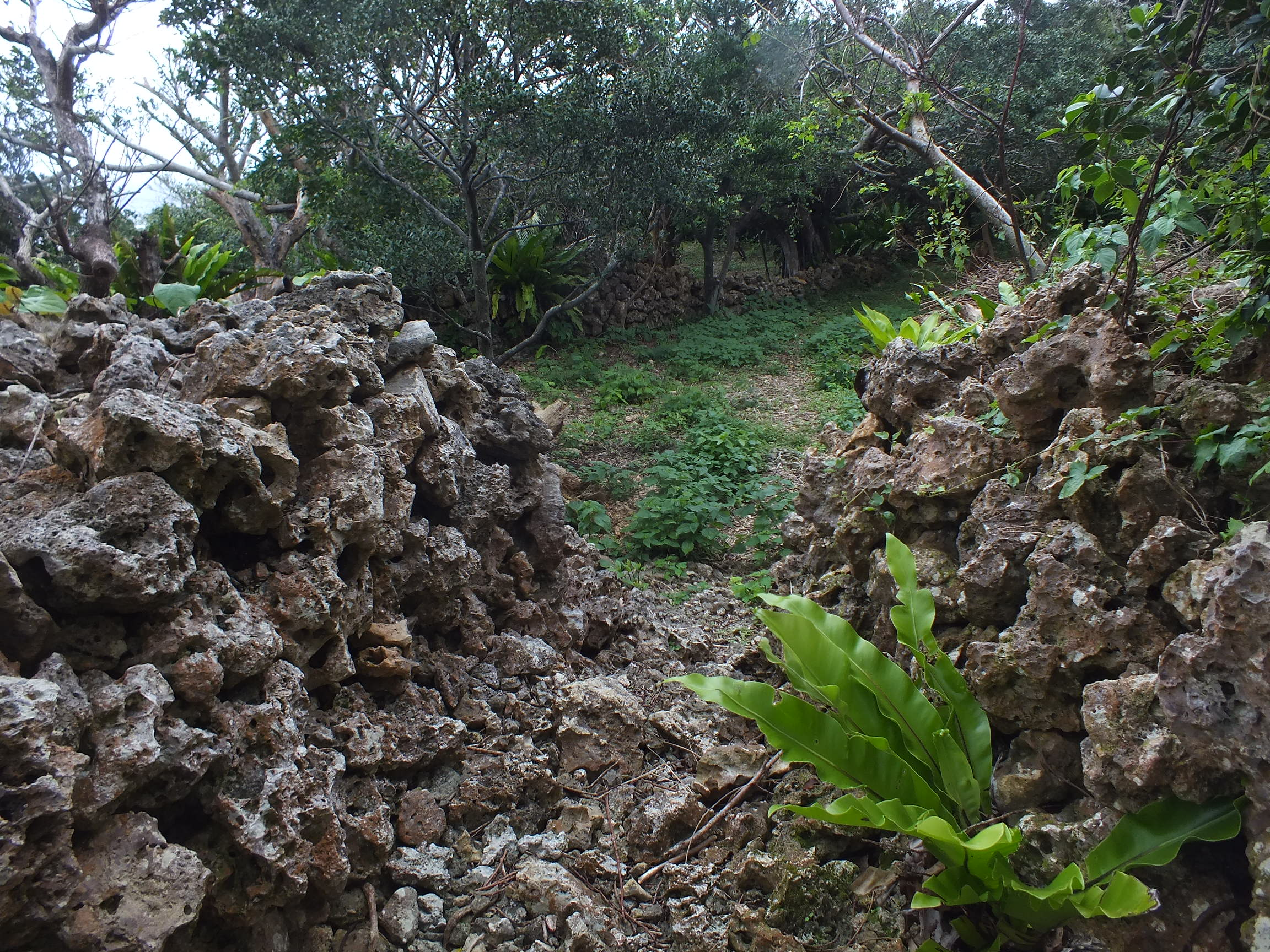
Castle ruins surrounded by coral stone walls.

== See also ==
- List of Historic Sites of Japan (Okinawa)
