= Yamada Castle =

Yamada Castle 山田城
- Onna, Okinawa
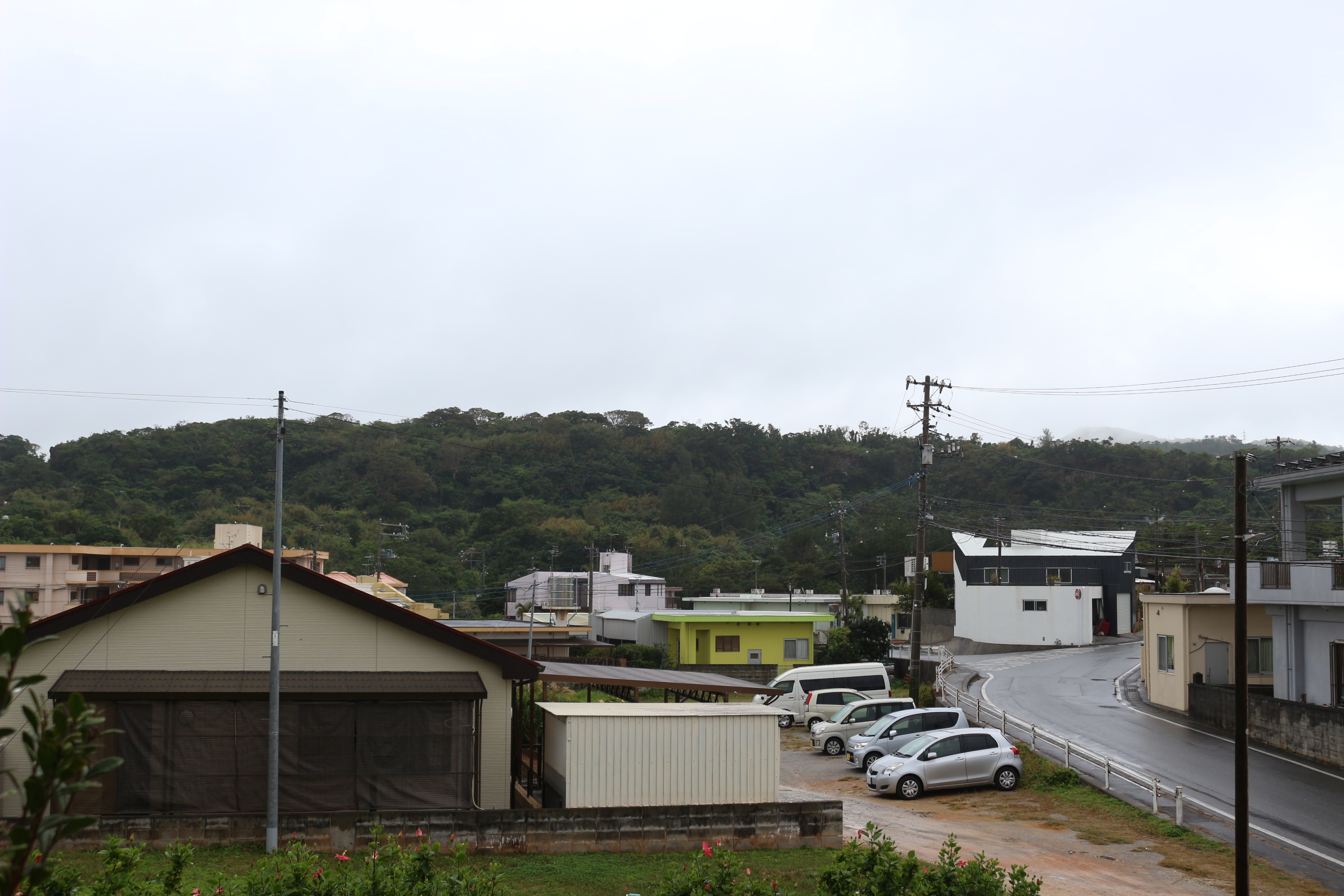
- Yamada Castle

Site information
- Type: Gusuku
- Open to the public: Yes
- Condition: Ruins

Location
- Yamada Castle Yamada Castle 山田城 (Japan)
- Coordinates: 26°25′50.4″N 127°46′56.7″E

Site history
- Built: 13th century
- In use: 13th century-1422
- Materials: Ryukyuan limestone, wood
- Events: materials used to build Zakimi Castle (1416-1422)

Garrison information
- Occupants: Gosamaru
- National Historic Site of Japan

Yamada Castle (山田城, Yamada jō; Okinawan: Yamada Gushiku) was a Ryūkyūan gusuku fortification located in the village of Onna, Okinawa Prefecture, Japan. It has been protected by the central government as a National Historic Site since 2008. It is famous for being the birthplace of the Ryūkyūan general Gosamaru.

== Overview ==
Yamada Castle is located on a long, narrow, tongue-shaped Ryūkyū limestone plateau at an elevation of approximately 90 meters on the west coast of central Okinawa Island. It is located approximately four kilometers from Zakimi Castle. It dates from the 14th to 15th centuries during the Gusuku Period of Ryūkyūan history, but the date of construction is unknown. It was established by a branch of family of the Iha Anji of Iha Gusuku in Ishikawa (now Uruma, Okinawa), and the northern cliff has a cave tomb for Gosamaru's ancestors, and a monument bearing the name "Gosamaru Ancestral Gravestone" which was erected in 1740. Gosamaru is said to have been the second son of Iha Anji III, a Nakijin prince who fled the conflict in the Hokuzan region and established his stronghold in Iha Castle. The previous lord of Yamada Castle, Yomitanzan Anji (Yamada Anji), was also a descendant of the Iha Anji clan, but since he had no heir, Gosamaru, the second son of Iha Anji III and the lord's brother, was adopted and succeeded as Yomitanzan Anji. In 1416, Gosamaru participated in King Shō Hashi's campaign against the Hokuzan clan.In return for his loyalty, Gosamaru was authorized to construct Zakimi Castle in Yomitan and moved his stronghold there. The stone walls of Yamada Castle were demolished to provide building materials for the new castle in 1420.

Archaeological excavations were conducted from 1986 to 1988.The castle was found to measure approximately 30 meters east-to-west and 160 meters north-to-south. Chinese ceramics and coins were also unearthed. Unpaved stone walls remain on the east and west sides.

== See also ==
- List of Historic Sites of Japan (Okinawa)
