= Zakimi Castle =

Zakimi Castle 座喜味城
- Yomitan, Okinawa
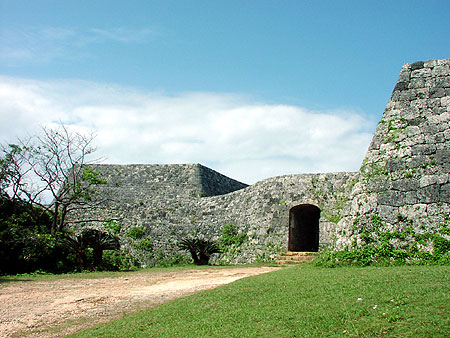
- Zakimi Castle

Site information
- Type: Gusuku
- Open to the public: yes
- Condition: Ruins, partially restored

Location
- Zakimi Castle
- Location within Okinawa Prefecture Location within Japan
- Coordinates: 26°24′29.3″N 127°44′31.9″E

Site history
- Built: 1416-1422
- Built by: Gosamaru
- In use: 1422–?
- Materials: Ryukyuan limestone, wood
- Battles/wars

UNESCO World Heritage Site
- Criteria: Cultural: ii, iii, vi
- Reference: 972
- Inscription: 2000 (24th Session)

Garrison information
- Occupants: Gosamaru, Aji of Yomitan Magiri
- National Historic Site of Japan

Zakimi Castle (座喜味城, Zakimi jō; Okinawan: Zachimi Gushiku) is a Ryūkyūan gusuku fortification located in the village of Yomitan, Okinawa Prefecture, Japan. It has been protected by the central government as a National Historic Site since 1972. It is in ruins, but the walls and foundations have been restored. In 2000, Zakimi Castle was designated as a UNESCO World Heritage Site, as a part of the Gusuku Sites and Related Properties of the Kingdom of Ryukyu.

== History ==
Zakimi Castle, is located on a high ground overlooking a wide area of the Nakagami region in the northern portion of central Okinawa Island. The sea and surrounding islands (including the Kerama Islands are visible, indicating its strategic military importance. The fortress has two inner courts, each with an arched gate. The gates use keystone construction, which is considered an older form of arch gate. The protruding sections of the castle walls reaching approximately 13 meters at their highest point and 3 meters at their lowest are made from Ryūkyū limestone, employing both interlocking and coursed masonry techniques, resulting in a massive structure with many curves, which is also characteristic of Ryūkyūan castles. Since no roof tiles have been excavated, it is believed that the buildings that once stood there had thatched roofs. The outer perimeter of the castle is 365 meters, and the area within the fortifications is 7,385 square meters.

The castle was built between 1416 and 1422 by the renowned Ryūkyūan general Gosamaru, a project which involved workers from as far away as the Amami Islands, and was partly constructed with materials taken from nearby Yamada Castle. It remained his stronghold until he was transferred to Nakagusuku Castle in 1430. Since trade artifacts dating to the mid-15th century onwards have been unearthed in archaeological excavations, it is presumed that the castle was used for some time even after Gosamaru's transfer, although much remains uncertain about its history.

In August 1944, the Imperial Japanese Army constructed an anti-aircraft gun position in the first enclosure of Zakimi Castle to protect Yomitan Auxiliary Airfield. In October of that year, the castle was severely damaged by aerial bombardment, and after the 1945 Battle of Okinawa it came under US military occupation. After the end of the war, Zakimi Castle Ruins became part of the Bolo firing range. In 1958, although it was designated an Important Cultural Property by the Government of the Ryukyu Islands, it was further damaged by the construction of a Nike anti-aircraft missile battery and radar site. Archaeological excavations and repairs to the stone walls were permitted in 1973, and with the decommissioning of the radar site in 1974, the castle was returned to the control of Japan.

In September 1991, the theater company "Daichi" staged "Shakespeare in Zakimi: A Midsummer Night's Dream" for two days. It was the first outdoor play at Zakimi Castle, based on Shakespeare's "A Midsummer Night's Dream," with Gosamaru as the protagonist. The castle was listed as one of the Continued 100 Fine Castles of Japan by the Japanese Castle Foundation in 2017.

== See also ==
- List of Historic Sites of Japan (Okinawa)
