= Lake Man =

Wetland area in Okinawa Prefecture, Japan

- 漫湖
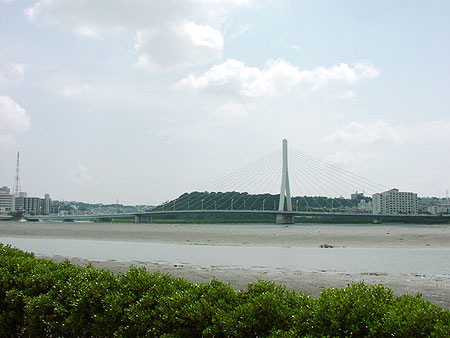
- Lake Man

- Location within Okinawa Prefecture
- Location: Okinawa Prefecture, Japan
- Coordinates: 26°11′49.8″N 127°41′00.0″E
- Basin countries: Japan
- Surface area: 0.11 square kilometres (0.042 mi^{2})
- Settlements: Naha and Tomigusuku, Okinawa, Okinawa Prefecture

Ramsar Wetland
- Official name: Manko
- Designated: 15 May 1999
- Reference no.: 996

Lake Man (漫湖, Okinawan: Manku, Japanese: Manko) is an area of wetlands in Okinawa that is located between the cities of Naha and Tomigusuku, and within Manko Park. Despite being called "Lake Man", it is in fact a wetland and not a lake. Lake Man covers 0.11 square kilometres (0.042 mi^{2}).

Lake Man is close to Naha Port, located at the confluence of the lower reaches of the Kokuba River and the Noha River, to the south of Naha. Travelers from outside Okinawa Prefecture, en route from Naha Airport to the city Naha, cross this estuary, with the left side commanding a view of Lake Man.

The Manko Waterbird and Wetland Center is located next to the wetland area and provides information and activities related to the area, as well as a boardwalk into the wetlands.

The name Manko is pronounced the same as a crude Japanese word for female genitals, resulting in some controversy.

== Nature ==
Lake Man is an area of brackish water at almost the same elevation as sea level. Since the 1960s, with the planting of mangroves, it has been transforming into tidelands. It has also become a relay point for migrating birds such as shorebirds and plovers, and in 1999 was designated a wetland of international importance under the Ramsar Convention.

A number of threatened species inhabit Lake Man, such as the shellfish Macoma nobilis, which is found only on Okinawa Island. The lake is also a noted home to sandpipers and plovers.

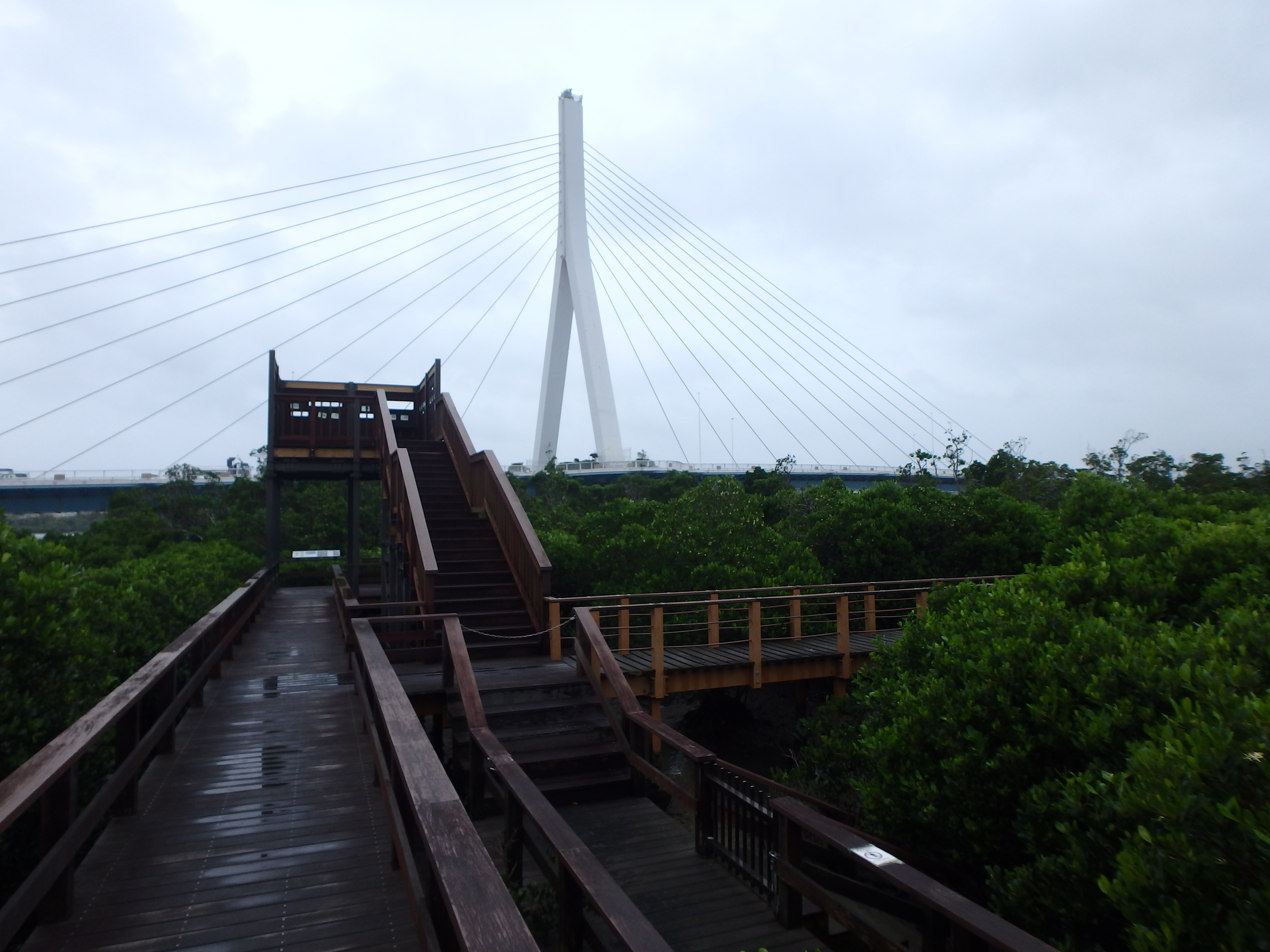
A view of the bird viewing hut and the Toyomio bridge from the boardwalk at the Manko Waterbird & Wetland Center

Deposition of sediments and the worsening of water quality due to the influx of wastewater are among the problems facing these wetlands.
