= Tomigusuku, Okinawa =

City in Okinawa Prefecture, Japan

Tomigusuku 豊見城市 Tumigushiku
- City
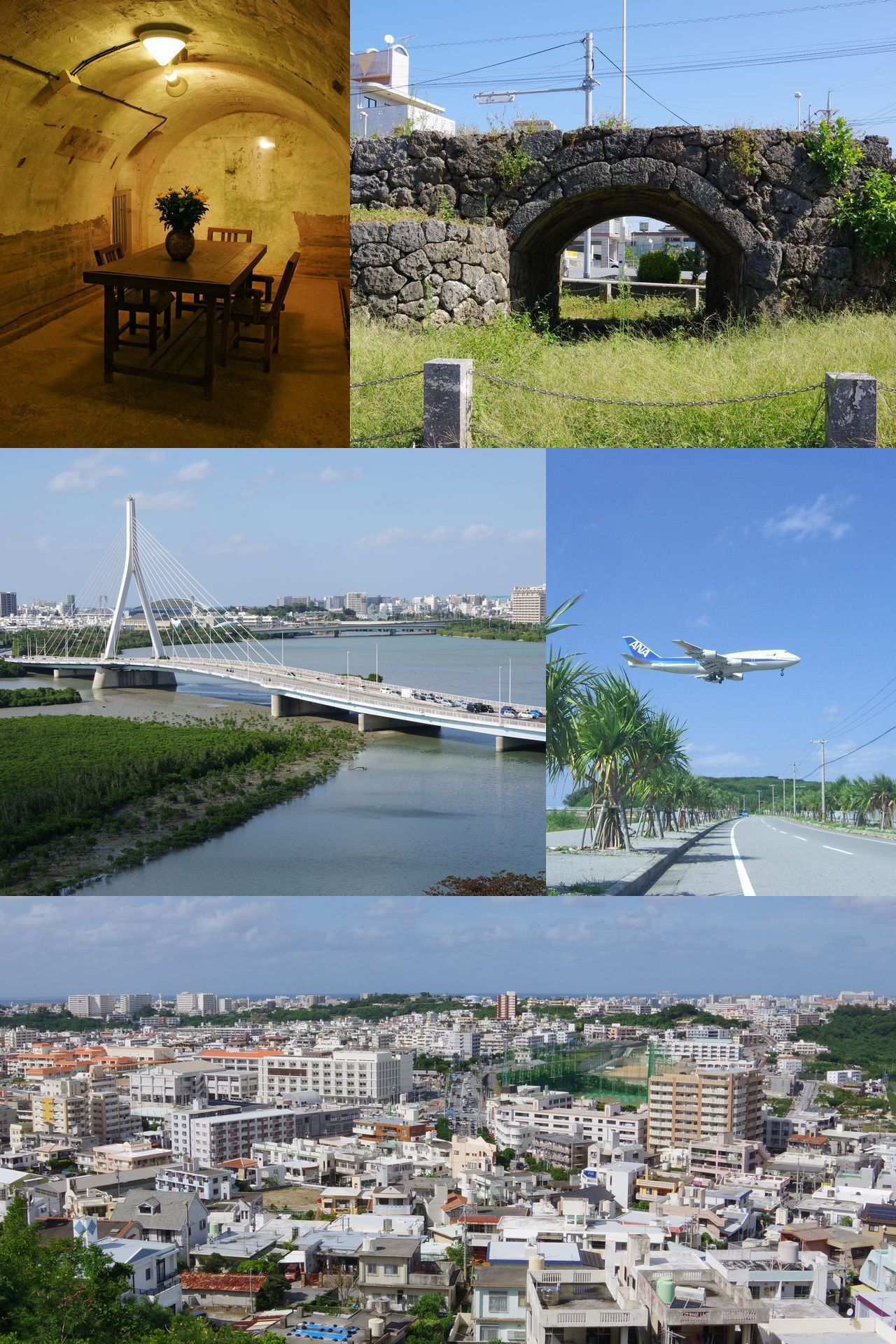
- Tomigusuku City Montage

- Flag Seal

- Location of Tomigusuku in Okinawa Prefecture

- Coordinates: 26°9′40″N 127°40′8″E
- Country: Japan
- Region: Kyushu
- Prefecture: Okinawa Prefecture

Government
  - Mayor: Tsuguto Tokumoto

Area
  - Total: 19.60 km^{2} (7.57 sq mi)

Population (October 1, 2020)
  - Total: 64,612
  - Density: 3,297/km^{2} (8,540/sq mi)
- Time zone: UTC+9 (Japan Standard Time)
- Address: 854-1, Aza Onaga, Tomigusuku-shi 901-0292
- Climate: Cfa
- Website: www.city.tomigusuku.okinawa.jp(in Japanese)
- Symbols
- Flower: Bougainvillea
- Tree: Ebony

Tomigusuku (豊見城市, Tomigusuku-shi; Okinawan: トゥミグシク, romanized: Tumigushiku) is a city located in Okinawa Prefecture, Japan. As of 1 October 2020, the city has an estimated population of 64,612 and a population density of 3,297 persons per km^{2}. The total area is 19.25 km^{2}.

On April 1, 2002, the administrative status of Tomigusuku was changed from village (Japanese: 村; son) to city (Japanese: 市; shi). Until then it had been the largest village in Japan.

== Geography ==
Tomigusuku is located along the western coast, on the southern part of Okinawa Island, facing the East China Sea. It is broadly rectangular, extending east–west, with Naha City on the north. The Noha River runs westward in the central part of the city, and then turns northward and pours into Lake Man.

The city includes the island of Senaga, located about 600 m offshore of Senaga Village. It used to be inhabited before the war but became deserted after the war. It was seized by the U.S. forces in 1946, but was returned to Okinawa Prefecture in 1977. It is currently linked to the main island by a bridge and has become famous as a fishing and shellfish collecting spot. It also includes facilities for sea bathing, camping and sports (baseball stadium).

=== Administrative divisions ===
The city includes twenty-four wards.

- Japanese name (ideograms, Okinawan reading)
- Bin (保栄茂, bin)
- Ganaha (我那覇, ganaha)
- Gibo (宜保, jifu)
- Iraha (伊良波, iraha)
- Kakazu (嘉数, kakaji)
- Kanera (金良, karara/kanira)
- Madanbashi (真玉橋, madanbashi)
- Nagadō (長堂, nagadō)
- Nakachi (名嘉地, nakachi/nākachi)
- Nesabu (根差部, misashippu)
- Noha (饒波, nūfa)
- Onaga (翁長, unaga)
- Senaga (瀬長, shinaga/anjina)
- Tagami (田頭, tagami)
- Taira (平良, tēra)
- Takamine (高嶺, takanmi)
- Takayasu (高安, takēn)
- Tohashina (渡橋名, tōshina)
- Tokashiki (渡嘉敷, tukahichi/tukashichi)
- Tomigusuku (豊見城, timigusuku)
- Toyosaki (豊崎)
- Ueta (上田, īta)
- Yone (与根, yuni)
- Zayasu (座安, zā)

=== Neighbouring municipalities ===
- Haebaru
- Itoman
- Naha
- Yaese

== Climate ==
Climate data for Tomigusuku (2003−2020 normals, extremes 2003−present)
Month	Jan	Feb	Mar	Apr	May	Jun	Jul	Aug	Sep	Oct	Nov	Dec	Year
Record high °C (°F)	27.6 (81.7)	26.7 (80.1)	27.8 (82.0)	29.0 (84.2)	31.0 (87.8)	32.6 (90.7)	34.6 (94.3)	35.0 (95.0)	33.9 (93.0)	32.8 (91.0)	30.7 (87.3)	29.0 (84.2)	35.0 (95.0)
Mean daily maximum °C (°F)	20.1 (68.2)	20.9 (69.6)	22.1 (71.8)	24.4 (75.9)	27.1 (80.8)	29.7 (85.5)	31.9 (89.4)	32.0 (89.6)	31.1 (88.0)	28.7 (83.7)	25.6 (78.1)	21.9 (71.4)	26.3 (79.3)
Daily mean °C (°F)	17.5 (63.5)	18.2 (64.8)	19.3 (66.7)	21.6 (70.9)	24.5 (76.1)	27.3 (81.1)	29.3 (84.7)	29.3 (84.7)	28.4 (83.1)	25.9 (78.6)	23.0 (73.4)	19.3 (66.7)	23.6 (74.5)
Mean daily minimum °C (°F)	15.2 (59.4)	15.8 (60.4)	16.9 (62.4)	19.3 (66.7)	22.4 (72.3)	25.3 (77.5)	27.3 (81.1)	27.2 (81.0)	26.2 (79.2)	23.8 (74.8)	20.9 (69.6)	17.0 (62.6)	21.4 (70.6)
Record low °C (°F)	5.8 (42.4)	10.0 (50.0)	9.0 (48.2)	14.0 (57.2)	16.2 (61.2)	19.9 (67.8)	21.4 (70.5)	23.4 (74.1)	21.9 (71.4)	18.9 (66.0)	14.4 (57.9)	10.0 (50.0)	5.8 (42.4)
Average precipitation mm (inches)	79.7 (3.14)	92.9 (3.66)	107.2 (4.22)	134.5 (5.30)	222.0 (8.74)	292.3 (11.51)	150.6 (5.93)	227.5 (8.96)	177.7 (7.00)	162.3 (6.39)	110.4 (4.35)	98.1 (3.86)	1,855.1 (73.04)
Average precipitation days (≥ 1.0 mm)	10.2	9.5	10.2	9.3	11.3	11.8	8.8	12.4	11.3	8.1	8.3	9.1	120.3
Source: Japan Meteorological Agency

== Education ==
=== High schools ===
- Okinawa Prefectural Nanbu Agricultural High School
- Okinawa Prefectural Tomigusuku High School
- Okinawa Prefectural Tomigusuku Minami High School

=== Junior high schools ===
- Tomigusuku Municipal Iraha Junior High School
- Tomigusuku Municipal Nagamine Junior High School
- Tomigusuku Municipal Tomigusuku Junior High School

=== Elementary schools ===
- Tomigusuku Municipal Iraha Elementary School
- Tomigusuku Municipal Nagamine Elementary School
- Tomigusuku Municipal Tomigusuku Elementary School
- Tomigusuku Municipal Toyomi Elementary School
- Tomigusuku Municipal Toyosaki Elementary School
- Tomigusuku Municipal Ueda Elementary School
- Tomigusuku Municipal Yutaka Elementary School
- Tomigusuku Municipal Zayasu Elementary School

== Notable people ==
- Natsumi Ikema, actress
- Mr Miyagi, fictional character, Karate Kid Movies
- Hirokazu Nema, basketball coach
- Kamejiro Senaga, politician
- Takako Uehara, singer (Speed)
- Rui Yonamine, dancer and choreographer (The Rampage from Exile Tribe)

== Cultural and natural assets ==
Tomigusuku City hosts forty-eight tangible cultural properties and monuments, most of which appear on municipal listings but are not officially designated or registered at the national, prefectural or municipal level.

- Name (Japanese) (Type of registration)

=== Cultural properties ===
- Bin Gusuku (保栄茂グスク)
- Bone artefacts from Gibo Akgari-nu-utaki Sacred Site (宜保アガリヌ御嶽 出土 骨製品) (Municipal)
- Documents relating to the Ōshiro Family of Aza Yone (字与根大城家文書) (Municipal)
- Earthen artefacts from Takamine Furujima Site (高嶺古島遺跡 出土 土製品) (Municipal)
- Madan-bashi Bridge Remains (真玉橋遺構) (Municipal)
- Madan-bashi Bridge Renovation Inscription (重修真玉橋碑文) (Municipal)
- Memorandum by Former Ōta Pechin from Kakazu in Tomigusuku Magiri (豊見城間切嘉数前大田親雲上勤書「口上覚」) (Municipal)
- Monument to the loyal dead (忠魂碑) (Municipal)
- Nagamine Gusuku (長嶺グスク)
- Senaga Gusuku / Anjina Gusuku (瀬長グスク)
- Survey Stone "い" Wonakabaru (印部石 い をなか原) (Municipal)
- Survey Stone "ニ" Kanahabaru (印部石 ニ かなは原) (Municipal)
- Survey Stone "ヌ" Mesashifubaru (印部石 ヌ めさしふ原) (Municipal)
- Survey Stone "ロ" Mesashifubaru (印部石 ロ めさしふ原) (Municipal)
- Taira Gusuku (平良グスク)

=== Folk cultural properties ===
- Chiiya Island (チーヤ (津屋))
- Funerary palanquin of Noha (饒波の龕) (Municipal)
- Gan-yā Palanquin House and Gangō Festival of Takayasu (高安龕屋と龕ゴウ祭)
- Gan-yā Palanquin House Site of Noha (饒波龕屋 (ガンヤー) 跡地)
- Gibo Bijun Praying Site (宜保ビジュン)
- Kōjā-yā Palanquin House of Bin (保栄茂コージャーヤー (龕屋))
- Kunjā-gā spring and windmill site (クンジャーガーと風車跡地)
- Madan-bashi Agari-nu-shīsā Stone Lion (真玉橋アガリヌシーサー)
- Madan-bashi Iri-nu-shīsā Stone Lion (真玉橋イリヌシーサー)
- Sacred lion of Takayasu (高安のシーシーメー・シーシウカミ)
- Stone lion and Sangwachā of Nesabu (根差部シーサーと三月遊び (サングヮチャー))
- Stone lion of Bin (保栄茂のシーサー)
- Stone lion of Nakachi (名嘉地シーサー)
- Stone lion of Noha (饒波のシーサーグヮー)
- Stone lion of Takamine (高嶺のシーサー)
- Stone lion of Tokashiki (渡嘉敷シーサー)
- Stone lions of Tagami (田頭シーサー)
- Takayasu Bijun Praying Site (高安ビジュン)
- Tuduruchi-gā spring (トゥドゥルチガー (轟泉))
- Village stone lion of Taira (平良のムラシーサー)

=== Historic sites ===
- Bin namai hippodrome and 15th night festival (保栄茂馬場と十五夜)
- Iraha Refugees Internment Camp Site (伊良波収容所跡)
- Ishihiya-bashi Bridge / Ishibāshi Bridge (石火矢橋)
- Jijimui Sacred Site (珠数森)
- John Manjiro and Onaga Takayasu Residence (ジョン万次郎と翁長高安家)
- Kakazu-banta Cliff (嘉数バンタ)
- Manko Lake, first hārī boat race location (ハーリー発祥の地「漫湖」)
- Sanskrit inscription stele (梵字碑)
- Tomigusuku Gusuku (豊見城グスク)
- Tomigusuku Normal Elementary School Site (豊見城尋常小学校跡地)
- Tomigusuku Utaki Sacred Site (豊見城御嶽)
- Yone salt industry and salt paddies site (与根塩づくりと塩田跡)
- Zayasu Ishimashi-mō meadows and its three pine trees (座安イシマシモーと三本松)

== See also ==
- Tomigusuku Castle
