= Nakasone Tuimiya =

Ryukyuan chieftain (1500–1530)

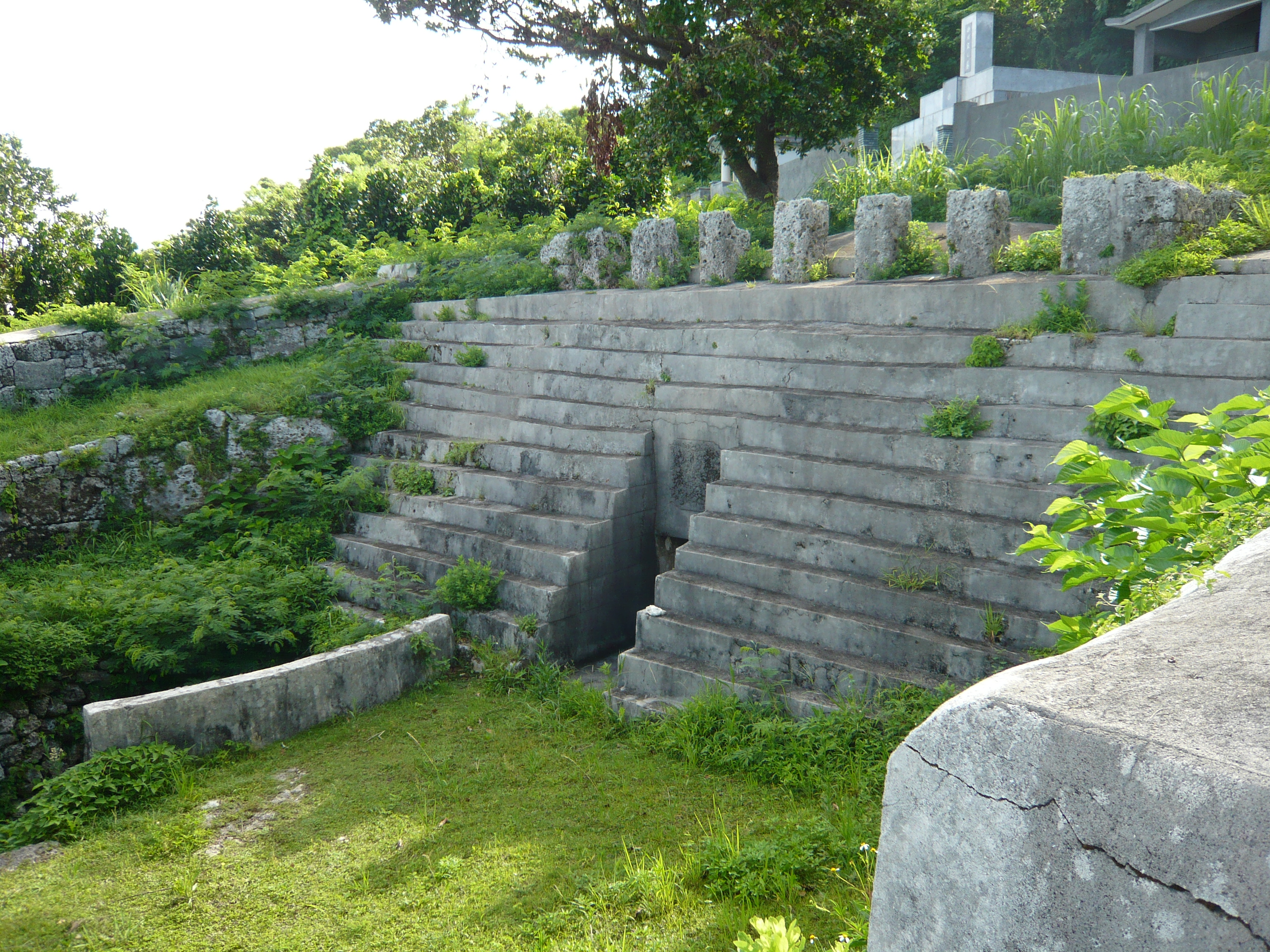
Tomb of Nakasone Toyomiya in Hirara, Okinawa.

Nakasone Tuimiya (also Nakasone Tuyumya or in Okinawan: Nakasuni Tuyumya) (仲宗根豊見親; also 仲宗根豊見親玄雅, Nakasone Tuyumya Genga) (active c. 1500–1530) was a Ryūkyūan Chieftain and later Anji of the Miyako Islands credited with repelling an invasion from Ishigaki Island, and expanding Miyako political control over some of the Yaeyama Islands. When the Miyako Islands were attacked by the Ryūkyū Kingdom, Nakasone saved the people of Miyako from harm by agreeing to surrender to annexation by the Kingdom.

== Early life ==
Nakasone was the great-great-grandson of Meguro Mori who, in the 14th century, defeated the Yonahabara army under Sata Ubunto to unite the Miyako Islands for the first time.

Toyomiya (or, Tuyumya in Okinawan) was not a name, but rather something akin to a title or honorific. While he passed on the family name Nakasone to his descendants, this lineage, of which he is the founder, is at the same time called the Chūdō family (忠導氏, Chūdō-uji). While the exact year of Nakasone's birth is unknown, the family's records indicate that he was born sometime in the Tianshun Chinese Imperial era, i.e. 1457–1464.

== Oyake Akahachi Rebellion ==
At this time, the Ryūkyū Kingdom, based at Shuri on Okinawa Island, did not yet have direct control over the Yaeyama or Miyako Islands, but merely expected tribute to be paid. In 1500, Oyake Akahachi of Ishigaki Island led the people of Ishigaki and the surrounding islands in revolt against paying tribute and against the Kingdom. Nakasone's family was entrenched in a power struggle with their rival the Kaneshigawa family for control of Miyako, and Oyake planned to invade the island during the division. Upon learning this, Nakasone led a preemptive invasion of the Yaeyama Islands, securing his status as leader of Miyako, and seizing Ishigaki, Yonaguni (where he took the daughter of the chieftain Untura as his prize), and a few other neighboring islands in the process.

Shortly after these successful invasions which expanded the geographical scope of Miyako's political control, the islands came under attack from a force of roughly 3,000 Ryūkyūan soldiers sent by King Shō Shin to suppress the rebellion. Seeing defeat as inevitable, Nakasone surrendered and agreed to have the Miyako Islands, along with the Yaeyamas which Nakasone had just secured, absorbed by the Ryūkyū Kingdom. He is today worshipped and celebrated as a hero for having spared the people of Miyako from the death and destruction that would have resulted from attempts to resist the invasion.

== Later life ==
Nakasone was formally appointed Aji of Miyako by the Sanshikan, which also began a system of sending representatives from Okinawa to help oversee the administration of this corner of the kingdom for three-year-long terms. Most aspects of local administration were left in the hands of Nakasone, however, who was also empowered to deal out rewards and punishments, and to appoint local leaders to lesser aristocratic titles and bureaucratic posts.

Nakasone established a government office called the kuramoto (蔵元) which oversaw the collection of contributions to the tribute payment to be sent to Shuri. To help ensure this process, Nakasone effected road maintenance, as well as the construction of the stone bridge Shimoji-Pasuntsu (下地橋道; J: Shimojibashi-dō).

Nakasone was succeeded as Chieftain of Miyako around 1530, by someone bearing the same name as his great-great-grandfather, Meguro Mori. His grave can be found in Hirara City on Miyako Island.
