= Oyake Akahachi =

Ryukyuan lord and rebel (d. 1500)

Oyake Akahachi (遠弥計赤蜂 / 於屋計赤蜂, Yaeyama:Ujakiakahati; died 1500), also Oyake Akahachi Hongawara (遠弥計赤蜂保武川良) or Horikawa Akahachi (堀川原赤蜂), was a Ryukyuan lord of Ishigaki Island who led a rebellion against the Ryukyu Kingdom in 1500.

== Early life and rebellion ==
It is said that Akahachi was born on Hateruma Island, and that he was large and physically strong even as a child. He moved to Ishigaki Island as a young adult, and became the chief of Ōhama Village (today part of Ishigaki City) soon afterward. His influence soon extended over all of Ishigaki Island, and beyond, to other islands in the Yaeyama Islands group. At some point late in the 15th century, the nearby Miyako Islands were divided between two influential families, the Nakasone and Kaneshigawa, who were fighting one another for dominance of the area. Seeking to take advantage of the chaos and disunity, Akahachi proposed an invasion of the Miyako Islands. However, Nakasone Toyomiya led a counterattack against Akahachi, overwhelming his forces and moving on to attack Yonaguni Island as well.

In the late 15th century, the Ryukyu Kingdom, based at Shuri on Okinawa Island, did not yet have direct control over the Yaeyama or Miyako Islands, but merely expected tribute to be paid. Akahachi led the people of Ishigaki and the surrounding islands in revolt against the kingdom, refusing to pay taxes or tribute for three years. After Nakasone conquered Yaeyama, a force of roughly 3,000 Ryukyuan troops was sent by King Shō Shin in 1500. The 46 ships were divided into two units, one attacking Tono Castle and the other attacking Shinkawa. The Ryukyuan army attacked relentlessly and captured Akahachi, who was later executed. The rebellion was finally suppressed with the annexation of the Sakishima Islands by Ryukyu.

== Legacy ==
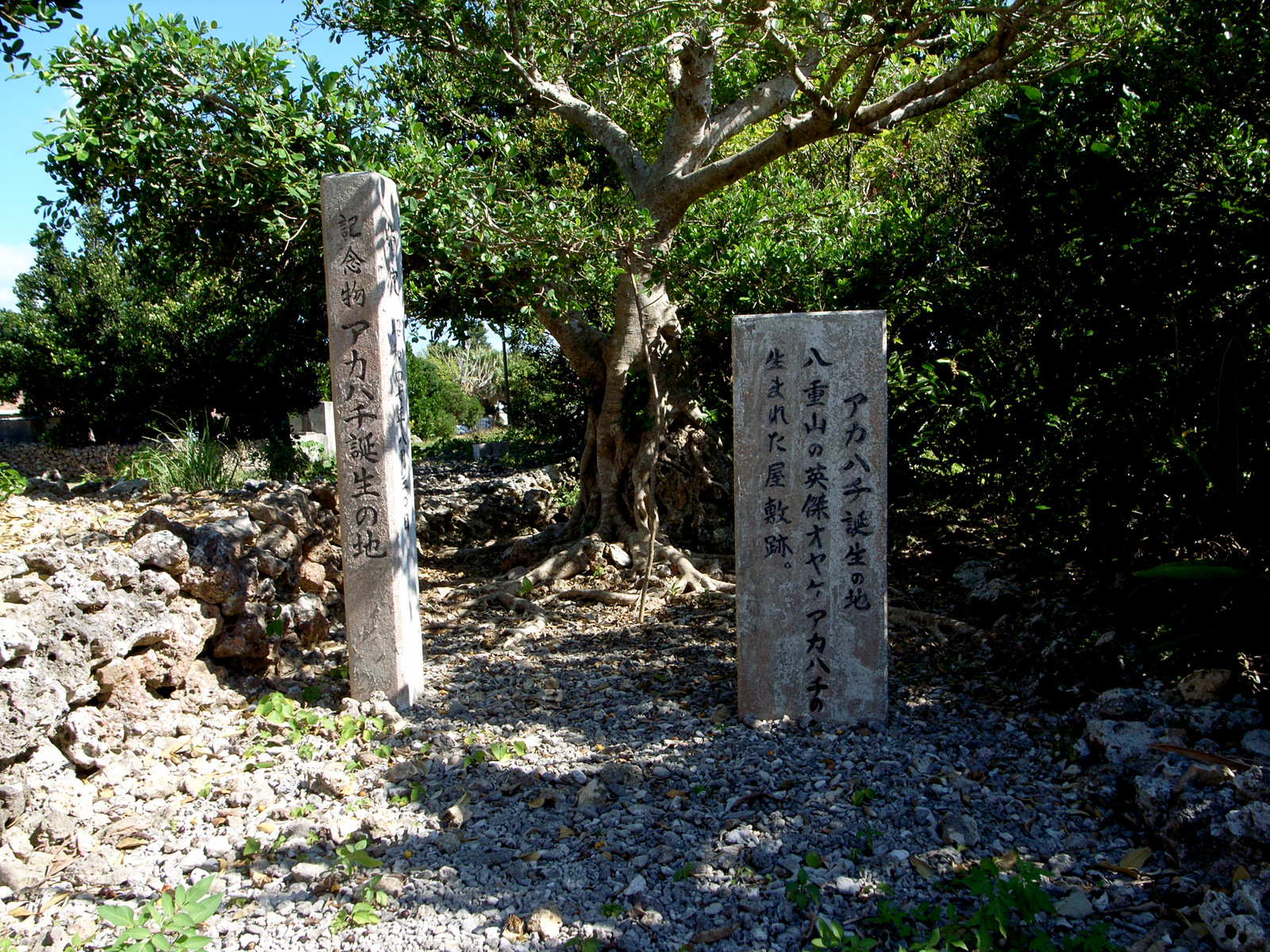
Akahachi Memorial on Hateruma

While official records and histories produced by the Ryukyu Kingdom label Oyake Akahachi as a rebel and a traitor, locally on Ishigaki and the surrounding islands he is known as a hero who sought to secure their freedom and independence. A stele in his honor is in the Ōhama area of Ishigaki City.
