= United States Military Government of the Ryukyu Islands =

Government of the Ryukyu Islands from 1945 to 1950

Coordinates: 26°30′N 128°0′E

United States Military Administration of the Ryukyu Islands: 琉球列島米国軍政府; Ryūkyū-rettō Beikoku Gunseifu
- 1945–1950
- Flag

- Territory controlled by USMGR
- Status: U.S. military occupation
- Capital and largest city: Naha
- Common languages: Japanese; Ryukyuan; English
- U.S. President
  - 1945 (first): Franklin D. Roosevelt
  - 1945–1950 (last): Harry S. Truman
- Governor
  - 1945 (first): Simon Bolivar Buckner Jr.
  - 1950 (last): Robert S. Beightler
- Historical era: Cold War
  - Battle of Okinawa: 1 April – 22 June 1945
  - Civil administration: 15 December 1950
- Currency: A yen (to July 1948)
Preceded by	Succeeded by
Empire of Japan	USCAR

The United States Military Government of the Ryukyu Islands abbr. USMGR (Japanese: 琉球列島米国軍政府, Hepburn: Ryūkyū-rettō Beikoku Gunseifu; Okinawan: Rūcū ʔAmirika Minhyōjōju), also referred to as U.S. Ryukyu Islands, was the government in the Ryukyu Islands, Japan (centered on the Okinawa Island) from 1945 to 1950, whereupon it was replaced by the United States Civil Administration of the Ryukyu Islands (USCAR).

== Background ==
The first prolonged American presence in the Ryukyu Islands commenced with the arrival of Commodore Matthew C. Perry in May 1853, on Okinawa. A bit more than one year later, this presence ended when Perry left. Perry had hoped to use Okinawa as a springboard to opening up relations with Japan during the Bakumatsu period. Almost 100 years later, Americans returned to the islands, beginning in April 1945, after the last battle of World War II came to an end. Again, the American presence was as a stepping stone to Japan. (Note: Fisch, Arnold G. Jr. (1988). Military Government in the Ryukyu Islands: 1945–1950 (PDF). Army Historical Series. Washington, D.C. LCCN 2017491247. OCLC 258121764. Archived from the original (PDF) on 2022-03-21.)

== Government system ==
The government was headed by the Military Governor (軍政長官, Gunsei Chōkan) and his second-in-command, the Chief Military Government Officer (軍政府長官, Gunsei-fu Chōkan). They were assisted by the Deputy Commander of the Military Government (軍政府副長官, Gunsei-fu Fuku-chōkan).

== See also ==
Media related to United States Military Government of the Ryukyu Islands at Wikimedia Commons

- United States Civil Administration of the Ryukyu Islands
- Government of the Ryukyu Islands, the body of Okinawan self-governance from 1952 to 1972.
- 1945 Katsuyama killing incident
- Naval Base Okinawa
