= United States Civil Administration of the Ryukyu Islands =

Government of the Ryukyu Islands from 1950 to 1972

Coordinates: 26°30′N 128°0′E

United States Civil Administration of the Ryukyu Islands 琉球列島米国民政府 Ryūkyū-rettō Beikoku Minseifu
- 1950–1972
- Flag of the United States Seal of the High Commissioner
- Anthem: The Star-Spangled Banner
- Territory administered by USCAR (present-day Okinawa Prefecture)
- Status: U.S. military occupation (1950–1952); U.S.-administered area (1952–1972)
- Capital and largest city: Naha
- Common languages: Japanese; English (Note: Following the return of Okinawa Islands to Japan in 1972, English remained as a foreign language for administrative purposes); Ryukyuan
- Demonyms: Okinawan; Japanese; American
- U.S. President
  - 1950–1953 (first): Harry S. Truman
  - 1969–1972 (last): Richard Nixon
- Governor
  - 1950–1951 (first): Douglas MacArthur
  - 1955–1957 (last): Lyman Lemnitzer
- High Commissioner
  - 1957–1958 (first): James Edward Moore
  - 1968–1972 (last): James Benjamin Lampert
- Historical era: Cold War
  - Military Administration: 22 June 1945
  - Civil Administration: 15 December 1950
  - Returned to Japan: 15 May 1972
- Currency: B yen (July 1948 – Sep 1958); U.S. dollar (1958–1972)
Preceded by	Succeeded by
USMGR	Japan; Okinawa Prefecture

The United States Civil Administration of the Ryukyu Islands abbr. USCAR (Japanese: 琉球列島米国民政府, Hepburn: Ryūkyū-rettō Beikoku Minseifu) was the civil administration government in the Ryukyu Islands, Japan (centered on Okinawa Island), replacing the United States Military Government of the Ryukyu Islands (itself created after World War II) in 1950, and functioned until the islands were returned to Japan in 1972. It oversaw the native Government of the Ryukyu Islands and could overrule any of its decisions.

== History ==
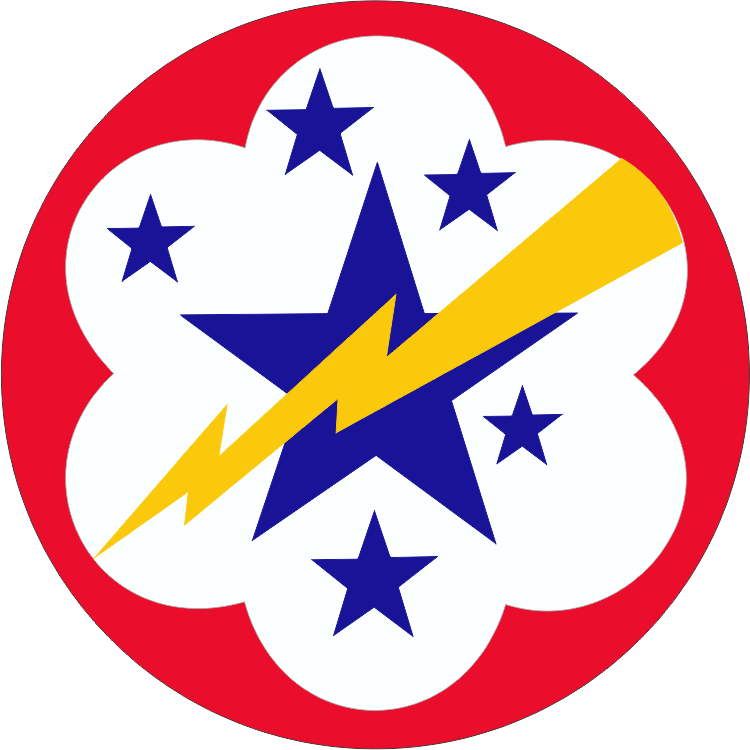
Western Pacific Command

The U.S. National Archives and Records Administration describes USCAR's history thus:

Following signing of the Instrument of Surrender, 2 September 1945, Ryukyu Islands were administered by Department of the Navy, 21 September 1945 – 30 June 1946, with Commanding Officer, Naval Operating Base, Okinawa functioning as chief military government officer under authority of Commander-in-Chief U.S. Pacific Fleet. Transfer of administration from Department of the Navy to War Department authorized by Joint Chiefs of Staff (JCS) approval, 1 April 1946, of JCS 819/11, 5 March 1946, with added proviso of JCS 819/12, 22 March 1946. Pursuant to implementing instructions of General Headquarters U.S. Army Forces in the Pacific (GHQ AFPAC), Okinawa Base Command redesignated Ryukyus Command, effective 1 July 1946, by General Order 162, Headquarters U.S. Army Forces, Western Pacific, and made responsible for administration under a Deputy Commander for Military Government. Ryukyu Islands administered successively by Ryukyus Command, 1 July – 30 November 1946; Philippines-Ryukyus Command, 1 December 1946 – 31 July 1948; and Ryukyuan Command, 1 August 1948 – 15 December 1950. USCAR established, effective 15 December 1950, by a directive of Headquarters Far East Command (HQ FEC, formerly GHQ AFPAC), AG 091.1 (5 December 1950) RCA, December 5, 1950, implementing a JCS memorandum, SM 2474-50, 11 October 1950, directing Commander-in-Chief Far East, Gen. Douglas MacArthur, to organize a civil administration for the Ryukyu Islands in accordance with JCS 1231/14, 4 October 1950. USCAR continued to function under Department of the Army (formerly War Department), 1950–71. Amami Island Group of Ryukyu Islands was returned to Japan by the Agreement between the United States of America and Japan concerning the Amami Islands, signed 24 December 1953, and made effective 25 December 1953. USCAR abolished following entrance into force, 15 May 1972, of the Agreement between the United States of America and Japan concerning the Ryukyu Islands and the Daito Islands, signed 17 June 1971, by which the remaining island groups of the Ryukyu Islands, including the Okinawa Island Group, were returned to Japan.

After the Battle of Okinawa in World War II, the United States Navy initially administered the Okinawa group while the other three groups came under Army control. On 18 July 1945, the Navy transferred control to U.S. Army Forces in the Pacific (AFPAC), but on 21 September, assumed control again, organizing the United States Military Government of the Ryukyu Islands. Finally, on 1 July 1946, the Army retook control, organizing the Ryukyu Command from the previous Okinawa Base Command. On 1 January 1947, AFPAC was reorganized as Far East Command. A unified Ryukyu Command, including a military government apparatus, was placed under General Headquarters, Far East Command (GHQ FECOM), in Tokyo.

When the Treaty of San Francisco came into force in April 1952, the Ryukyu Islands were placed under U.S. administration temporarily. However, their ultimate sovereignty remained with Japan. USCAR, which was a subordinate organization of the forces of the United States, surveilled the native Ryukyuan Government and could overrule all the decisions made by the Ryukyuan Government.

The official currency was the B yen from 1948 to 1958 when the B yen was abolished and the US dollar was used. The government printed Ryukyuan postage stamps and passports. Cars drove on the right in contrast to the main islands of Japan. The island switched to driving on the left in 1978 to bring it in line with Japan.

== Peace treaty specifications ==
The post-war peace treaty of 28 April 1952 stated, in part:

Article 3: Japan will concur in any proposal of the United States to the United Nations to place under its trusteeship system, with the United States as the sole administering authority, Nansei Shoto south of 29 degrees north latitude (including the Ryukyu Islands and the Daitō Shoto), Nanpō Shoto south of Sofu Gan (including the Bonin Islands, Rosario Island and the Volcano Islands) and Parece Vela and Marcus Island. Pending the making of such a proposal and affirmative action thereon, the United States will have the right to exercise all and any powers of administration, legislation, and jurisdiction over the territory and inhabitants of these islands, including their territorial waters.

Article 4b: Japan recognizes the validity of dispositions of property of Japan and Japanese nationals made by or pursuant to directives of the United States Military Government in any of the areas referred to in Articles 2 and 3.

After a formal agreement reached on 17 June 1971, control of Okinawa was given back to Japan on 15 May 1972, and USCAR was abolished. This completed the disposition of this Japanese property by USMG.

== Government system ==
The post of Governor (民政長官, Minsei Chōkan) was created in 1950 and replaced in 1957 by the High Commissioner of the Ryukyu Islands (琉球列島高等弁務官, Ryūkyū-rettō Kōtō-benmukan) until 1972.

== Flag ==
Civil ensign of Ryukyu from 1967

The Criminal Code of Ryukyu restricted the flying of any national flags except the flag of the United States. The protesters against the Ryukyu government flew the Hinomaru, the flag of Japan. Civil ships of Ryukyu flew an ensign derived from the International maritime signal flag for "D" instead of Japanese or American ensigns. The ensign changed to "Hinomaru below a triangular flag labeled "Ryukyus" and "琉球" (Japanese for "Ryukyu") in 1967.

== See also ==
Media related to United States Civil Administration of the Ryukyu Islands at Wikimedia Commons

- Koza riot
- Ryukyuan people
- Ryukyu independence movement
- Postage stamps and postal history of Ryukyu Islands
- Naval Base Okinawa
