= List of cultural properties of Japan (Okinawan structures) =

This list is of the cultural properties of Japan designated in the category of structures (建造物, kenzōbutsu) for the prefecture of Okinawa.

== National cultural properties ==
As of 1 September 2017, twenty-three important cultural properties with forty-one component structures have been designated, being of national significance.

Property	Date	Municipality	Comments	Image	Coordinates	Ref.
Ieudun Tomb 伊江御殿墓; Ieudun baka	1687	Naha	turtle-back tomb of the Ie line, descendants of the seventh son of Shō Sei, fourth king of the Second Shō Dynasty		26°13′33″N 127°43′32″E	
Sonohyan-utaki Stone Gate 園比屋武御嶽石門; Sonohyan-utaki sekimon	1519	Naha	heavily damaged during the war and restored to its previous form in 1957; part of the Prefectural Historic Site and of the UNESCO World Heritage Site Gusuku Sites and Related Properties of the Kingdom of Ryukyu.		26°13′05″N 127°43′02″E	
Chunnaagaa 喜友名泉; Chunnaagaa	1751-1829	Ginowan	stone castellum aquae or fountain		26°17′16″N 127°45′37″E	
Former Enkaku-ji Hōjō Bridge 旧円覚寺放生橋 kyū-Engakuji Hōjō-bashi	1498	Naha	Enkaku-ji was founded by Shō Shin in 1492; all its wooden buildings were destroyed during the war; the ornately carved bridge suffered minor damage and has since been restored; its carvings are a Prefectural Cultural Property		26°13′06″N 127°43′09″E	
Miyaradunchi 旧宮良殿内 kyū-Miyaradunchi	1751-1829	Ishigaki	residence of a senior Pechin; the gardens are a Place of Scenic Beauty		24°20′28″N 124°09′35″E	
Former Sōgen-ji First Gate and Stone Wall 旧崇元寺第一門及び石牆 kyū-Sōgenji daiichimon oyobi sekishō	before 1527	Naha	Sōgenji, said to have been founded in 1470, was destroyed during the war; the gate was restored in 1952		26°13′13″N 127°41′26″E	
Former Nakazato Magiri Warehouse Overseer's Stone Walls 旧仲里間切蔵元石牆 kyū-Nakazato magiri kuramoto sekishō	1716-1735	Kumejima	the wooden buildings are lost		26°21′16″N 126°48′28″E	
Former Yonaguni Family Residence 旧与那国家住宅 kyū-Yonaguni-ke jūtaku	1913	Taketomi	part of the Taketomi Preservation District for Groups of Traditional Buildings		24°19′43″N 124°05′15″E	
Former Waukei Family Tomb 旧和宇慶家墓 kyū-Waukei-ke haka	1601-1700	Ishigaki	combines a roofed cave burial chamber with a walled courtyard		24°21′48″N 124°09′54″E	
Tamaudun 玉御殿; Tamaudun	1688	Izena	designation comprises two components: the burial chamber and stone wall		26°55′42″N 127°56′29″E	
Tamaudun 玉陵; Tamaudun	1501	Naha	designation comprises five components: the central chamber for temporary burial prior to washing the bones and final entombment, east chamber for the entombment of kings and queens, west chamber for the entombment of other members of the royal family, and inner and outer stone walls; also an Historic Site and part of the UNESCO World Heritage Site Gusuku Sites and Related Properties of the Kingdom of Ryukyu		26°13′05″N 127°42′53″E	
Gongen-dō 権現堂; Gongendō	1786	Ishigaki	designation comprises two components: the shinden and haiden; first constructed in 1614, destroyed by the 1771 Great Yaeyama Tsunami, and rebuilt the following decade		24°20′37″N 124°09′21″E	
Takara Family Residence 高良家住宅; Takara-ke jūtaku	1868-1911	Zamami	boatman's house on Geruma Island		26°10′38″N 127°17′35″E	
Uezu Family Residence 上江洲家住宅; Uezu-ke jūtaku	1754	Kumejima	designation comprises two components: the main building and anteroom		26°21′18″N 126°44′56″E	
Aragaki Family Residence 新垣家住宅; Aragaki-ke jūtaku	1801-1911	Naha	designation comprises four components: the nineteenth-century main building and workshop, and the 1911 annex and climbing kiln; a potter's house (tsuboya-yaki (壺屋焼))		26°12′45″N 127°41′35″E	
Sesoko Toteikun 瀬底土帝君; Sesoko tōteīkun	late Edo period	Motobu	on Sesokojima (瀬底島); complex includes honden, haiden, garden, stone walls, hearth		26°38′37″N 127°51′53″E	
Former Ōgimi Village Office Building 大宜味村役場旧庁舎; Ōgimi-son yakuba kyū-chōsha		Ōgimi			26°42′06″N 128°07′14″E	
Nakamura Family Residence 中村家住宅; Nakamura-ke jūtaku	late Edo to Meiji period	Kitanakagusuku	designation comprises five components: the main building (late Edo to Meiji period), anteroom, annexe, storehouse, and pigpen or fuuru (all Meiji period)		26°17′24″N 127°48′02″E	
Nakandakari Riverside Facilities 仲村渠樋川; Nakandakari hiijaa	1912	Nanjō	amenities include a fountain, retaining walls, pavements etc.		26°08′43″N 127°47′34″E	
Tsukayama Distillery 津嘉山酒造所施設; Tsukayama shuzōsho shisetsu	1928	Nago	awamori distillery; designation comprises two components: the main building and distillery		26°35′29″N 127°59′00″E	
Tennyo Bridge 天女橋; Tennyo bashi	1502	Naha	located in Shuri Castle Park named after the tennyo		26°13′07″N 127°43′07″E	
Tōyumya Tombs 豊見親墓; Tōyumya baka	late Edo period	Hirara	designation comprises three components: the tomb of sixteenth-century chieftain Nakasone Toyomiya, of his third son Chirimara Toyomiya (知利真良豊見親), and of Atonma (あとんま)		24°48′31″N 125°16′47″E	
Mekaru Family Residence 銘苅家住宅; Mekaru-ke jūtaku	1906	Izena	designation comprises two components: the main building and annexe		26°55′04″N 127°56′05″E	

== Prefectural Cultural Properties ==
As of 31 July 2017, eighteen properties have been designated at a prefectural level.

Property	Date	Municipality	Comments	Image	Coordinates	Ref.
Nakagusuku Castle Ruins 中城城跡; Nakagusuku-jō ato	C14/15	Kitanakagusuku	also an Historic Site; part of the UNESCO World Heritage Site Gusuku Sites and Related Properties of the Kingdom of Ryukyu.		26°17′02″N 127°48′05″E	for all refs see
Sueyoshi-gū Stepped Approach 末吉宮磴道; Sueyoshi-gū tōdō		Naha	the shrine is an Historic Site		26°13′47″N 127°42′50″E	
Zakimi Castle Ruins 座喜味城跡; Zakimi-jō ato	early C15	Yomitan	also an Historic Site; part of the UNESCO World Heritage Site Gusuku Sites and Related Properties of the Kingdom of Ryukyu.		26°24′30″N 127°44′30″E	
Misakion 美崎御嶽; Misakion		Ishigaki	also a Prefectural Historic Site		24°20′07″N 124°09′30″E	
Tenkō-gū 天后宮; Tenkō-gū		Kumejima			26°21′12″N 126°48′26″E	
Oroku Tomb 小禄墓; Oroku baka		Ginowan			26°15′25″N 127°44′16″E	
Ryūen-kyō 龍淵橋; Ryūen-kyō		Naha			26°13′08″N 127°43′06″E	
Hijigawa Bridge and Approach Road ヒジ川橋及び取付道路; Hijigawa bashi oyobi toritsuke dōro	C17/18	Naha	built of Ryukyu limestone (琉球石灰岩) across the Kanagusuku River (金城川) on the road between Uchaya-udun (御茶屋御殿) and Shikina-en; length of 13.8 metres (45 ft) and width of 5.2 metres (17 ft), with 28 metres (92 ft) of road to the east and 18.5 metres (61 ft) to the west; situated next to Kinjō Dam		26°12′43″N 127°43′04″E	
Ufugusuku Anji Grave 大城按司の墓; Ufugusuku anji no haka		Nanjō			26°10′21″N 127°45′40″E	
Nakijin Castle Ruins 今帰仁城跡; Nakijin-jō ato	C13/15	Nakijin	also an Historic Site; part of the UNESCO World Heritage Site Gusuku Sites and Related Properties of the Kingdom of Ryukyu.		26°41′28″N 127°55′47″E	
Chinen Castle Ruins 知念城跡; Chinen-jō ato		Nanjō	also an Historic Site		26°09′38″N 127°48′41″E	
Mabuni Family Tomb 摩文仁家の墓; Mabuni-ke no haka		Haebaru			26°12′28″N 127°44′14″E	
Iso no Takau Tomb 伊祖の高御墓; Iso no Takau haka		Urasoe			26°15′19″N 127°43′30″E	
Former Shuri Castle Shureimon 旧首里城守礼門 kyū-Shuri-jō Shureimon		Naha			26°13′05″N 127°43′01″E	
Former Enkaku-ji Main Gate 旧円覚寺総門 kyū-Enkakuji sōmon		Naha			26°13′06″N 127°43′09″E	
Tsuboya Ware Climbing Kiln 壺屋の荒焼のぼり窯; Tsuboya no arayaki no noborigama		Naha			26°12′50″N 127°41′27″E	
Yabu Kugō Residence 屋部の久護家; Yabu no Kugō-ke		Nago			26°36′10″N 127°57′15″E	
Shinmori Family Residence 新盛家住宅; Shinmori-ke jūtaku		Taketomi			24°23′21″N 123°44′48″E	

== Municipal Cultural Properties ==
As of 1 May 2016, thirty-five properties have been designated at a municipal level.

Property	Date	Municipality	Comments	Image	Coordinates	Ref.	
King Gihon Tomb 義本王の墓; Gihon no haka		Kunigami			26°52′11″N 128°15′37″E	for all refs see	
Tombs of the Hundred Faithful Retainers 百按司墓; Momojana haka		Nakijin			26°40′59″N 128°00′14″E		
Ūnishi Tomb 大北墓; Ūnishi baka		Nakijin			26°40′59″N 128°00′14″E		
Ichigusuku Tomb イチグスク(池城)墓; Ichigusuku baka		Nakijin			26°41′26″N 127°57′35″E		
Kōri Tūmiya Beacon 古宇利トゥーミヤ(遠見台); Kōri tūmiya (tōmidai)		Nakijin	beacon on Kōri Island (古宇利島); cf. Sakishima Beacons		26°42′26″N 128°01′01″E		
Genka Ueki 源河ウェーキ; Genka ueki		Nago			26°37′53″N 128°04′03″E		
Awa Stone Bridge 安和の石橋; Awa no ishibashi		Nago			26°36′54″N 127°55′43″E		
Kannon-ji 観音寺; Kannonji		Kin			26°27′19″N 127°55′17″E		
Kedakaru Kannondō 嘉手苅観音堂; Kedakaru Kannondō		Uruma			26°25′15″N 127°48′50″E		
Yan Spring ヤンガー; Yangā		Uruma	on Miyagi Island (宮城島)		26°22′15″N 127°58′56″E		
Gāra Stone Bridge ガーラ矼; Gāra hashi		Uruma			26°18′58″N 127°54′12″E		
Yoshimoto Residence 吉本家; Yoshimoto-ya		Uruma	on Hamahiga Island (浜比嘉島).It was burned down on 2010.		26°19′23″N 127°57′56″E		
Awase Bijuru 泡瀬ビジュル(社殿、鳥居、手水鉢); Awase bijuru (shaden, torii, chōzubachi)		Okinawa	designation comprises three components: the shaden, torii, and chōzubachi; spirit stones are enshrined		26°19′14″N 127°49′59″E		
Chibugawa ちぶ川; Chibugawa		Chatan			26°18′35″N 127°46′21″E		
Aragaki Stone Bridge 新垣の石橋; Aragaki no ishibashi		Nakagusuku			26°16′10″N 127°46′53″E		
Yuntanzaudun Graves 読谷山御殿の墓; Yuntanzaudun no haka		Naha			26°13′30″N 127°43′53″E		
Motobu Udun Tomb 本部御殿墓; Motobu Udun-baka	late C17 / early C18	Ginowan			26°15′08″N 127°45′29″E		see Information board
Madan Bridge Remains 「真玉橋遺構」 Madan-bashi ikō		Tomigusuku			26°11′43″N 127°41′43″E		
Ōshiro Residence 大城家; Ōshiro-ya		Itoman			26°08′03″N 127°40′31″E		
Kamiemon Family Residence 上江門家住宅主屋ほか5件; Kamiemon-ke jūtaku nushiya hoka goken		Yaese	designation comprises six components		26°07′14″N 127°43′52″E		
Chichingā チチンガー; Chichingā		Nanjō			26°11′17″N 127°45′39″E		
Furnace for Papers 焚字炉 funjiro		Nanjō			26°08′29″N 127°47′29″E		
Shimazoe Ōzato Aji Tomb 島添大里按司の墓; Shimazoe ōzato aji no haka		Nanjō			26°11′11″N 127°45′35″E		
Shūkyūjō Bridge Stele 修宮城橋碑; Shūkyūjō-bashi hi		Haebaru			26°11′13″N 127°43′50″E		
Uhei Bridge Stele 修宮城橋碑; Uhei-bashi hi		Haebaru			26°11′13″N 127°43′50″E		
Survey Stone 印部土手石 shirube doteishi		Haebaru			26°11′13″N 127°43′50″E		
Kominato Matsubara Tomb 小港松原墓; Kominato Matsubara haka		Kumejima			26°21′18″N 126°44′45″E		
Nemoto Residence Stone Wall 根元家の石垣; Nemoto-ke no ishigaki		Tokashiki			26°11′47″N 127°21′46″E		
Asa Boatman Residence Stone Wall 阿佐船頭殿の「石垣」 Asa sendōdono no ishigaki		Zamami			26°14′11″N 127°18′36″E		
Bonito Fishing Industry Founder Monument 「鰹漁業創始功労記念碑」 katsuo-ryō-gyō sōshi kōrō kinenhi		Zamami			26°13′44″N 127°18′12″E		
Hisamatsu Megalithic Tomb Cluster 久松みゃーか(巨石墓)群; Hisamatsu myāka (kyoseki haka) gun	C13/16	Miyakojima			24°47′11″N 125°15′51″E		
West Tsuga Tomb 西ツガ墓 nishi tsuga haka		Miyakojima			24°48′15″N 125°16′39″E		
Hirara Daiichi Elementary School Main Gate and Stone Wall 平良第一小学校の正門と石垣; Hirara daiichi shōgakkō no seimon to ishigaki	c.1932	Miyakojima			24°47′54″N 125°17′05″E		
Zuifuku Tunnel 瑞福隧道; Zuifuku zuidō	1933-37	Miyakojima	1 km drainage tunnel		24°48′15″N 125°16′39″E		
Akairome Miyatorion 赤イロ目宮鳥御嶽; Akairome Miyatorion		Ishigaki	utaki in Kabira				
Akanmashū Tomb 赤馬主の墓; Akanmashū no haka		Ishigaki	in Miyara				

== Registered Cultural Properties ==
As of 1 September 2017, eighty-two properties at thirty-four sites have been registered (as opposed to designated) at a national level.

Property	Date	Municipality	Comments	Image	Coordinates	Ref.
Sunjagā 潮平ガー; Sunjagā	Taishō period	Itoman			26°08′37″N 127°40′38″E	
Minamidaitōjima West Port Former Boiler Hut 南大東島西港旧ボイラー小屋; Minamidaitōjima Nishikō kyū-boirā koya	1924	Minamidaitō			25°50′33″N 131°13′05″E	
Kinjō Masuharu Family Residence 金城増治家住宅; Kinjō Masuharu-ke jūtaku	1891	Itoman	four registrations: main residence, pigpen, well, and stone wall		26°06′20″N 127°41′29″E	
Kamiyama Family Residence 神山家住宅; Kamiyama-ke jūtaku	1909-38	Taketomi	four registrations: well and stone wall (1909), main residence (1912), and water tank (1938)		24°14′08″N 124°00′47″E	
Former Tōyō Sugar Kitadaitō Branch 旧東洋製糖北大東出張所 kyū-Tōyō Seitō Kitadaitō shutchōjo	1918	Kitadaitō			25°57′15″N 131°17′11″E	
West Pier 西桟橋 nishi sanbashi	1938	Taketomi	length of 105 metres (344 ft) and width of 4.4 metres (14 ft)		24°19′54″N 124°04′47″E	
Iko Pier 伊古桟橋; Iko sanbashi	1935	Taketomi	length of 354 metres (1,161 ft) and width of 4.5 metres (15 ft)		24°14′47″N 124°00′54″E	
Nagomi Tower なごみの塔; Nagomi no tō	1953	Taketomi	height of 4.5 metres (15 ft)		24°19′50″N 124°05′07″E	
Former Kunigami Agricultural College Entrance 旧国頭農学校玄関 kyū-Kunigami nōgakkō genkan	1902	Nago	relocated in 1965		26°35′45″N 127°57′47″E	
Ōmori Family Residence 大盛家住宅; Ōmori-ke jūtaku	1915	Taketomi	four registrations: main residence, well, stone wall, and screen wall or hinpun (ヒンプン); on Kohama Island		24°20′21″N 123°58′40″E	
Former Tōyō Sugar Rock Phosphate Storage Facility 旧東洋製糖燐鉱石貯蔵庫 kyū-Tōyō Seitō rinkōseki chozōko	1919	Kitadaitō			25°57′14″N 131°17′06″E	
Former Tōyō Sugar Rock Phosphate Cargo Pier 旧東洋製糖燐鉱石積荷桟橋 kyū-Tōyō Seitō rinkōseki tsumini sanbashi	1919	Kitadaitō			25°57′14″N 131°17′03″E	
Irifukuhama Family Residence 入福浜家住宅主屋; Irifukuhama-ke jūtaku shuoku	Taishō period	Yonaguni	main residence; renovated in 2002		25°57′16″N 131°17′13″E	
Ryūkyū Mura 琉球村; Ryūkyū mura	end of Edo to Meiji period	Onna	seven registrations: Former Ōshiro Family Residence (旧大城家住宅) main residence (end of the Edo period), Former Higa Family Residence (旧比嘉家住宅) main residence (1877), Former Shimabukuro Family Residence (旧島袋家住宅) main residence and raised storehouse (1887), Former Tamanaha Family Residence (旧玉那覇家住宅) main residence (1891), Former Hirata Family Residence (旧平田家住宅) pigpen (1897), and Former Nishishigaki Family Residence (旧西石垣家住宅) main residence (end of Meiji period); all relocated in 1981/2		26°25′45″N 127°46′28″E	
Aragaki Family Residence 新垣家住宅; Aragaki-ke jūtaku	1896/1956	Naha	six registrations: screen wall, pigpen, stone wall, and east and south ponds (1896) and main residence (1956)		26°13′48″N 127°42′42″E	
Iritakenishi Family Residence 入嵩西家住宅; Iritakenishi-ke jūtaku	late Meiji period to 1948	Ishigaki	four registrations: well (late Meiji period), main building (1911 renovated in 1955), screen wall (1914), and stone wall (1948)		24°21′00″N 124°09′01″E	
Ōno Drainage Tunnel 大野越排水溝; Ōno goshihai suikō	1934	Miyakojima	length of 640 metres (2,100 ft)		24°48′21″N 125°19′28″E	
Former Tōyō Sugar Shimosaka Bathhouse 旧東洋製糖下阪浴場 kyū-Tōyō Seitō Shimosaka yokujō	late Taishō period	Kitadaitō	two registrations: bathhouse and water tank		25°57′17″N 131°17′15″E	
Former Tōyō Sugar Employee Bathhouse 旧東洋製糖社員浴場 kyū-Tōyō Seitō shain yokujō	early Shōwa period	Kitadaitō	two registrations: bathhouse and water storage tank		25°57′19″N 131°17′16″E	
Sueyoshi Family Residence 末吉家住宅; Sueyoshi-ke jūtaku	late Taishō period	Kitadaitō	two registrations: main residence and stone wall		25°57′13″N 131°17′13″E	
Tokuyama Family Residence 渡久山家住宅; Tokuyama-ke jūtaku	1894 to early Shōwa period	Ishigaki	four registrations: pigpen and well (1894, the well was extended at the beginning of the Shōwa period), main residence (1925), and stone wall (beginning of the Shōwa period)		24°20′35″N 124°09′37″E	
Kubura Family Residence 久部良家住宅; Kubura-ke jūtaku	Meiji period	Yonaguni	two registrations: main residence (mid Meiji period, relocated in 1940) and stone wall (late Meiji period)		24°28′02″N 123°00′17″E	
Yaeyama Minzoku-en 八重山民俗園; Yaeyama Minzoku-en	1909/23	Ishigaki	two registrations: Former Morita Family Residence (森田家住宅) main residence (1909, relocated in 1984) and Former Makishi Family Residence (旧牧志家住宅) main residence (1923, relocated in 1980)		24°24′18″N 124°08′43″E	
Nirokusō 弐六荘; Nirokusō	1940	Kitadaitō			25°57′16″N 131°17′13″E	
Tōgei Family Residence 東迎家住宅; Tōgei-ke jūtaku	early Meiji period to 1953	Yonaguni	five registrations: stone basin and well (early Meiji period, well renovated mid-Shōwa period); and main residence, water tank, and stone wall (1953, main residence renovated 1985)		24°28′10″N 123°00′16″E	
Okinawa World おきなわワールド; Okinawa wārudo	late Meiji period to 1934	Nanjō	five registrations: Former Irei Family Residence (旧伊礼家住宅) main residence, Former Kyan Family Residence (旧喜屋武家住) main residence, and Former Taba Family Residence (旧田場家住宅) main residence (all late Meiji period); Former Chinen Family Residence (旧知念家住宅) pigpen (1897); and Former Uezato Family Residence (旧上里家住宅) main residence (1934); all relocated in 1995/6		26°08′19″N 127°45′04″E	
Yagi Family Residence 屋宜家住宅; Yagi-ke jūtaku	1915	Taketomi	five registrations: main residence, screen wall, and well (1952); stone wall (1952, renovated 1954), and annexe (1955)		26°07′38″N 127°44′13″E	
Okinawa City Furusato-en 沖縄市立ふるさと園; Okinawa shiritsu Furusato-en	1924	Okinawa	three registrations: Former Kuba Family Residence (旧久場家住宅) main residence and screen wall and Former Hirata Family Residence (旧平田家住宅) pigpen (all relocated in 1985/6)		26°19′41″N 127°48′15″E	
Chatan Uchinā Family Residence 北谷町うちなぁ家 主屋, ふーる; Chatan-chō Uchinā-ya	Meiji period	Chatan	two registrations: main residence (1898, relocated in 2005) and pigpen (early Meiji period, relocated in 2006)		26°19′40″N 127°46′06″E	
Former Nishinaka Sugar Cooperative Refinery Chimney 旧西中共同製糖場煙突 kyū-Nishinaka kyōdō seitō jōentotsu	1942	Miyakojima	height of 13 metres (43 ft)		24°48′21″N 125°16′50″E	
Misatomura Residence 美里村屋; Misatomura-ya	1954	Okinawa	renovated in 1974		26°20′47″N 127°48′53″E	
Former Kokuba Family Residence 旧國場家住宅 kyū-Kokuba-ke jūtaku	1930	Onna	main residence; renovated in 2011		26°25′45″N 127°46′28″E	
Ishigaki Yaima Mura 石垣やいま村; Ishigaki Yaima-mura	1907/1923	Ishigaki	Former Ōhama Family Residence (1907) and Former Kishaba Family Residence (1923), both renovated in 2008		24°24′14″N 124°08′39″E	
Former Nashiro Family Residence 旧名城家住宅 kyū-Nashiro-ke jūtaku	1905	Izena	two registrations: main building and stone wall		26°55′51″N 127°55′33″E	

== See also ==
- National treasures of Japan
- List of historic sites of Japan (Okinawa)
- Ryūkyū Kingdom
- Hague Convention for the Protection of Cultural Property in the Event of Armed Conflict
