= List of historic sites of Japan (Okinawa) =

This list is of the historic sites of Japan located within the Prefecture of Okinawa. Much of the heritage of the Ryūkyū Kingdom and Islands was destroyed during the Battle of Okinawa. The mausoleum complex of Tamaudun, Shuri Castle, Katsuren Castle, Nakagusuku Castle, Nakijin Castle, Zakimi Castle, Sefa-utaki, and Sonohyan-utaki all form part of the UNESCO World Heritage Site Gusuku Sites and Related Properties of the Kingdom of Ryukyu.

== National Historic Sites ==
As of 1 December 2025, forty-four Sites have been designated as being of national significance.

Site	Island	Municipality	Comments	Image	Coordinates	Type	Ref.
Furusutobaru Castle フルスト原遺跡; Furusutobaru iseki	Ishigaki Island	Ishigaki	C13-C15 gusuku-style fortifications, domestic buildings, utaki, and tombs extending for 12.3 ha on the Ryūkyū limestone (琉球石灰岩) hills overlooking Miyara Bay; said to have been used by Oyake Akahachi and suppressed by the forces of Shō Shin in 1500; finds include local pottery, white porcelain and celadon from China, and the bones of horses and cows		24°21′04″N 124°11′42″E	2	
Agena Castle ruins 安慶名城跡; Agena-jō ato	Okinawa Island	Uruma	gusuku fortified in the fifteenth century		26°22′51″N 127°51′01″E	2	
Iha Shell Mound 伊波貝塚; Iha kaizuka	Okinawa Island	Uruma	Jōmon site discovered in 1920; finds include shells, fish bones, animal borns, earthenware, stoneware, and goods made of horn		26°25′14″N 127°49′15″E	1	
Ireibaru Site 伊礼原遺跡; Ireibaru iseki	Okinawa Island	Chatan	early Jōmon site; goods of jade and obsidian are evidence of early maritime trade		26°19′28″N 127°45′31″E	1	
Uegusuku Castle ruins 宇江城城跡; Uegusuku-jō ato	Kumejima Island	Kumejima	of uncertain date, but probably razed at the time of assimilation into the Ryūkyū Kingdom c.1500; finds include Chinese ceramics and fish bones; the view extends over the entire island		26°22′37″N 126°46′12″E	2	
Uzahama Site 宇佐浜遺跡; Uzahama iseki	Okinawa Island	Kunigami	Yayoi site on the northern tip of the island		26°51′58″N 128°15′37″E	1	
Urasoe Castle ruins 浦添城跡; Urazoe-jō ato	Okinawa Island	Urasoe	fortifications date back to C13/C14; incurred heavy damage during the Battle of Okinawa		26°14′47″N 127°43′56″E	2	
Enkaku-ji Site 円覚寺跡; Enkaku-ji ato	Okinawa Island	Naha	founded in 1492 by Shō Shin; the wooden temple buildings were destroyed during the war, an ornately carved stone bridge (ICP) survives		26°13′06″N 127°43′11″E	3	
Ogidō Shell Mound 荻堂貝塚; Ogidō kaizuka	Okinawa Island	Kitanakagusuku	Jōmon period, with a 1.2 m thick deposit of shells		26°17′36″N 127°47′55″E	1	
Shimotabaru Castle ruins 下田原城跡; Shimotabaru-jō ato	Hateruma Island	Taketomi			24°04′10″N 123°46′45″E	2	
Tamagusuku Castle ruins 玉城城跡; Tamagusuku-jō ato	Okinawa Island	Nanjō			26°08′39″N 127°46′50″E	2	
Tamaudun 玉陵; Tamaudun	Okinawa Island	Naha	royal mausoleum complex constructed in 1501; World Heritage Site		26°13′06″N 127°42′53″E	7	
Gushibaru Shell Mound 具志原貝塚; Gushibaru kaizuka	Iejima	Ie	variety of shells and Jōmon and Yayoi earthenware		26°42′30″N 127°48′03″E	1	
Gushikawa Castle ruins 具志川城跡; Gushikawa-jō ato	Okinawa Island	Itoman	C13-C15 Chinese ceramics found during excavations; thirteen-year restoration project between 2000 and 2012		26°04′49″N 127°39′52″E	2	
Gushikawa Castle ruins 具志川城跡; Gushikawa-jō ato	Kumejima Island	Kumejima	same name but distinct from the castle in Itoman		26°23′05″N 126°45′07″E	2	
Kunigami Hōsei Kaidō 国頭方西海道; Kunigami hōsei kaidō	Okinawa Island	Onna	historic route on the west coast of the island		26°26′05″N 127°47′23″E	6	
Nakijin Castle ruins 今帰仁城跡 附シイナ城跡; Nakijin-jō ato tsuketari Shiina-jō ato	Okinawa Island	Nakijin	sacked in 1432; World Heritage Site; designation includes the site of Shiina Castle (シイナ城)		26°41′28″N 127°55′47″E	2	
Zakimi Castle ruins 座喜味城跡; Zakimi-jō ato	Okinawa Island	Yomitan	constructed c. 1420 by Gosamaru; World Heritage Site		26°24′30″N 127°44′30″E	2	
Sefa-utaki 斎場御嶽; Seifa-utaki	Okinawa Island	Nanjō	shrine; excavated artefacts including magatama are an ICP; World Heritage Site		26°10′24″N 127°49′38″E	3	
Yamada Castle ruins 山田城跡; Yamada-jō ato	Okinawa Island	Onna	Home of Gosamaru. Partially deconstructed to build Zakimi Castle		26°25'53.8"N 127°46'57.4"E 26°25′11″N 127°47′12″E	2	
Itokazu Castle ruins 糸数城跡; Itokazu-jō ato	Okinawa Island	Nanjō	damaged during the war		26°09′06″N 127°45′46″E	2	
Shuri Castle 首里城跡; Shuri-jō ato	Okinawa Island	Naha	palace of the Ryūkyū Kings; the main hall was repurposed as the haiden of Okinawa Shrine; reconstructed after near-total destruction during the war; World Heritage Site		26°13′01″N 127°43′09″E	2	
Katsuren Castle ruins 勝連城跡; Katsuren-jō ato	Okinawa Island	Uruma	C15 fortified residence of Amawari; World Heritage Site		26°19′50″N 127°52′43″E	2	
Sakishima Beacons 先島諸島火番盛; Sakishima-shotō hibanmui	Sakishima Islands	Miyakojima, Ishigaki, Tarama, Taketomi, Yonaguni	beacon network established in 1644 by the Ryūkyū Kings, under the influence of the Satsuma Domain, to monitor shipping in relation to the policy of sakoku		24°40′21″N 124°42′17″E	2	
Kabira Shell Mound 川平貝塚; Kabira kaizuka	Ishigaki Island	Ishigaki	inland to the northwest of Kabira Bay		24°28′01″N 124°07′58″E	1	
Ōyama Shell Mound 大山貝塚; Ōyama kaizuka	Okinawa Island	Ginowan			26°16′25″N 127°44′42″E	1	
Yamato Spring 大和井; Yamato gā	Miyakojima Island	Miyakojima	constructed c.1720 and mentioned in Yōsei-kyūki (雍正旧記) (1727); reserved for official use (see also Water supply in Miyakojima)		24°48′40″N 125°17′09″E	8	
Chinen Castle ruins 知念城跡; Chinen-jō ato	Okinawa Island	Nanjō	repaired in C18 by Shō Kei		26°09′38″N 127°48′41″E	2	
Nakagusuku Castle ruins 中城城跡; Nakagusuku-jō ato	Okinawa Island	Kitanakagusuku	built by Gosamaru of Zakimi Castle to defend against Amawari of Katsuren Castle; World Heritage Site		26°17′02″N 127°48′05″E	2	
Nakagami Hōsei Kaidō - Futenma Pilgrimage Route 中頭方西海道及び普天間参詣道; Nakagami hōsei kaidō oyobi Futenma sankei michi	Okinawa Island	Urasoe			26°14′45″N 127°43′19″E	6	
Nakabaru Site 仲原遺跡; Nakabaru iseki	Ikeijima Island	Uruma	C5 BC settlement with eleven sunken stone hearths		26°23′30″N 127°59′39″E	1	
Nakadomari Site 仲泊遺跡; Nakadomari iseki	Okinawa Island	Onna	cave dwellings and shell mound		26°26′07″N 127°47′28″E	1	
Shimashīi-Ōzato Castle ruins 島添大里城跡; Shimashīōzato-jō ato	Okinawa Island	Nanjō	captured by Shō Hashi in the early C15; excavations have uncovered Chinese ceramics and items of iron and bronze		26°08′26″N 127°46′07″E	2	
Uchimaudūn 内間御殿; Uchimaudūn	Okinawa Island	Nishihara	centre for veneration of the Ryūkyū Kings, founded on the site of the residence of Shō En before he became king; damaged during the war		26°13′42″N 127°46′05″E	3	
Sueyoshi-gū Site 末吉宮跡; Sueyoshigū ato	Okinawa Island	Naha	shrine to Kumano Gongen dating to the time of Shō Taikyū, destroyed during the war		26°13′47″N 127°42′50″E	3	
Mekaru Tomb Cluster 銘苅墓跡群; Mekaru haka ato gun	Okinawa Island	Naha	group of 330 C14/15 tombs with a large C18 turtle-back tomb; includes the Izenadunchi Tomb (伊是名殿内の墓)		26°13′50″N 127°41′51″E	7	
Momenbaru Site 木綿原遺跡; Momenbaru iseki	Okinawa Island	Yomitan	includes a burial with a stone sarcophagus and Yayoi ceramics		26°22′12″N 127°44′06″E	1	
Sashiki Castle ruins 佐敷城跡; Sashiki-jō ato	Okinawa Island	Nanjō			26°09′58″N 127°47′14″E	2	
Nakagusuku Hanta Road 中城ハンタ道; Nakagusuku Hanta michi	Okinawa Island	Nakagusuku			26°16′46″N 127°47′46″E		
Kitadaitōjima Phosphorus Mining Site 北大東島燐鉱山遺跡; Kitadaitō-jima rinkōzan iseki	Kitadaitōjima Island	Kitadaitō			25°57′14″N 131°17′06″E	6	
Binnu Utaki 弁之御嶽; Binnu utaki	Okinawa Island	Naha			26°13′04″N 127°43′53″E	3, 8	
Shiraho Saonetabaru Cave Ruins 白保竿根田原洞穴遺跡; Shiraho Saonetabaru dōketsu iseki	Ishigaki Island	Ishigaki			24°22′57″N 124°12′21″E	1	
Chatan Castle ruins 北谷城跡; Chatan-jō ato	Okinawa Island	Chatan			26°18′35″N 127°46′06″E	2	
Sōgen-ji Site 崇元寺跡; Sōgenji ato	Okinawa Island	Naha			26°13′14″N 127°41′26″E	3	

== Prefectural Historic Sites ==
As of 1 May 2025, fifty-six Sites have been designated as being of prefectural importance.

Site	Island	Municipality	Comments	Image	Coordinates	Type	Ref.
Ryūtan and its Surroundings 龍潭及びその周辺; Ryūtan oyobi sono shūhen	Okinawa Island	Naha			26°13′12″N 127°43′02″E		for all refs see
Sonohyan-utaki 園比屋武御嶽; Sonohyan utaki	Okinawa Island	Naha	World Heritage Site		26°13′05″N 127°43′02″E		
Noguni Sōkan Grave 野国総官の墓; Noguni Sōkan no haka	Okinawa Island	Kadena			26°20′56″N 127°44′43″E		
German Emperor's Tributary Monument ドイツ皇帝博愛記念碑; Doitsu kōtei hakuai kinen hi	Miyakojima Island	Miyakojima			24°48′24″N 125°16′45″E		
Nakasone Toyomiya Grave 仲宗根豊見親の墓; Nakasone Toyomiya no haka	Miyakojima Island	Miyakojima			24°48′32″N 125°16′45″E		
Uehiyayama Site 上比屋山遺跡; Uehiyayama iseki	Miyakojima Island	Miyakojima			24°43′43″N 125°21′04″E		
Noborudake Spirit Stones 野原岳の霊石; Noborudake no tamaishi	Miyakojima Island	Miyakojima			24°45′54″N 125°19′27″E		
Nakazato Magiri Kuramoto Site 仲里間切蔵元跡; Nakazato magiri kuramoto ato	Kume Island	Kumejima			26°21′17″N 126°48′29″E		
Misakion 美崎御嶽; Misakion	Ishigaki Island	Ishigaki			24°20′07″N 124°09′30″E		
Yagaji Untenbaru Sabaya Shell Mound 屋我地運天原サバヤ貝塚; Yagaji Untenbaru Sabaya kaizuka	Yagaji Island	Nago			26°40′20″N 128°00′16″E		
Noguni Shell Mound Cluster 野国貝塚群; Noguni kaizuka-gun	Okinawa Island	Kadena			26°21′01″N 127°44′47″E		
Sachihijā Shell Mound 崎樋川貝塚; Sachihijā kaizuka	Okinawa Island	Naha			26°14′15″N 127°41′00″E		
Henna Shell Mound 平安名貝塚; Henna kaizuka	Okinawa Island	Uruma			26°19′05″N 127°53′17″E		
Komesu Shell Mound 米須貝塚; Komesu kaizuka	Okinawa Island	Itoman			26°05′19″N 127°42′04″E		
Kumejima Ōhara Shell Mound 久米島大原貝塚; Kumejima Ōhara kaizuka	Kume Island	Kumejima			26°21′01″N 126°43′38″E		
Shimotabaru Shell Mound 下田原貝塚; Shimotabaru kaizuka	Hateruma Island	Taketomi			24°04′13″N 123°46′39″E		
Nakama No.1 Shell Mound 仲間第一貝塚; Nakama daiichi kaizuka	Iriomote Island	Taketomi			24°16′31″N 123°52′58″E		
Nakama No.2 Shell Mound 仲間第二貝塚; Nakama daini kaizuka	Iriomote Island	Taketomi			24°16′50″N 123°53′23″E		
Binishi Shell Mound 平西貝塚; Binishi kaizuka	Iriomote Island	Taketomi			24°19′33″N 123°55′02″E		
Iejima Deer Fossils 伊江島鹿の化石; Iejima shika no kaseki	Iejima Island	Ie			26°44′08″N 127°48′49″E		
Izena Tamaudun 伊是名玉御殿; Izena Tamaudun	Izena Island	Izena			26°54′57″N 127°57′06″E		
Izena Castle Site 伊是名城跡; Izena-jō ato	Izena Island	Izena			26°54′53″N 127°57′09″E		
Birthplace of King Shō En 尚円王生誕地屋敷内「みほそ所」 Shō En ō seitanchi yashiki nai (Mihoso-dokoro)	Izena Island	Izena			26°56′00″N 127°57′00″E		
Sashiki Yodore 佐敷ようどれ; Sashiki yōdore	Okinawa Island	Nanjō	family mausoleum of Shō Shishō, father of Shō Hashi; relocated from Sashiki Nishiuehara in 1764		26°09′44″N 127°47′20″E		
Large Stones of Nakashima 仲島の大石; Nakashima no ōishi	Okinawa Island	Naha			26°12′41″N 127°40′37″E		
Nakijin Village Nakahara Baba 今帰仁村仲原馬場; Nakijin-son Nakahara baba	Okinawa Island	Nakijin			26°41′17″N 127°57′56″E		
Nishitō-utaki 西塘御嶽; Nishitō-utaki	Taketomi Island	Taketomi			24°19′46″N 124°05′06″E		
Kuramoto Site 蔵元跡; Kuramoto ato	Taketomi Island	Taketomi			24°19′09″N 124°04′38″E		
Kakinohana Castle Site 垣花城跡; Kakinohana-jō ato	Okinawa Island	Nanjō			26°08′52″N 127°47′32″E		
Iso Castle Site 伊祖城跡; Iso-jō ato	Okinawa Island	Urasoe			26°15′26″N 127°43′22″E		
Iha Castle Site 伊波城跡; Iha-jō ato	Okinawa Island	Uruma			26°25′18″N 127°49′05″E		
Ishikinawa Castle Site 伊敷索城跡; Ishikinawa-jō ato	Kume Island	Kumejima	also pronounced Chinaha Castle		26°20′33″N 126°45′46″E		
Shurikinjō-chō Ishidatami-michi 首里金城町石畳道; Shurikinjō-chō ishidatami-michi	Okinawa Island	Naha	also a Prefectural Place of Scenic Beauty		26°12′58″N 127°42′55″E		
Kaiketsu Haneji River Monument 改決羽地川碑記; Kaiketsu Haneji-gawa hiki	Okinawa Island	Nago			26°37′11″N 128°00′58″E		
Yamashita No.1 Cave 山下町第一洞穴; Yamashita-chō daiichi dōketsu	Okinawa Island	Naha			26°12′03″N 127°40′24″E		
Urasoe Shell Mound 浦添貝塚; Urasoe kaizuka	Okinawa Island	Urasoe			26°15′18″N 127°43′31″E		
Kogachi Ware Kiln Site 古我知焼窯跡; Kogachi-yaki kama ato	Okinawa Island	Nago			26°37′37″N 127°59′28″E		
Hamasaki Shell Mound 浜崎貝塚; Hamasaki kaizuka	Iejima Island	Ie			26°42′47″N 127°49′44″E		
Utida Stones ウティダ石; Utida ishi	Kumejima Island	Kumejima			26°22′50″N 126°46′52″E		
Taramajima Ntabaru Tōyumya Myāka 多良間島の土原豊見親のミャーカ; Taramajima no Ntabaru Tōyumya no myāka	Taramajima Island	Miyako			24°40′17″N 124°42′04″E		
Terayama Site 寺山の遺跡; Terayama no iseki	Taramajima Island	Miyako			24°40′13″N 124°42′17″E		
Hamamoto Sachipin Shell Mound 浜元サチビン貝塚; Hamamoto Sachipin kaizuka	Okinawa Island	Motobu			26°40′16″N 127°53′24″E		
Yamakawa Minatobaru Site 山川港原遺跡; Yamakawa Minatobaru iseki	Okinawa Island	Motobu			26°40′48″N 127°52′56″E		
Yamakawa Kakiuchi Gongen Cave Site 山川垣内権現洞穴遺跡; Yamakawa Kakiuchi Gongen dōketsu iseki	Okinawa Island	Motobu			26°40′45″N 127°53′05″E		
Sumaryā Myāka スムリャーミャーカ; Sumaryā Myāka	Kurima Island	Miyako			24°43′26″N 125°15′19″E		
Minton Gusuku ミントングスク; Minton gusuku	Okinawa Island	Nanjō			26°08′43″N 127°47′30″E		
Iejima Gohezu Cave Site 伊江島のゴヘズ洞穴遺跡; Iejima no Gohezu dōketsu iseki	Iejima Island	Ie			26°43′25″N 127°46′55″E		
Shimoji-chō Ikeda Bridge 下地町の池田矼; Shimoji-chō no Ikeda-bashi	Miyakojima Island	Miyakojima			24°45′12″N 125°17′08″E		
Hirae Arasuku Village Site 平得アラスク村遺跡; Hirae Arasuku-mura iseki	Ishigaki Island	Ishigaki			24°21′23″N 124°10′37″E		
Kusatobaru Shell Mound 久里原貝塚; Kusatobaru kaizuka	Iheyajima Island	Iheya			27°02′31″N 127°58′31″E		
Tōzato Onda Site 桃里恩田遺跡; Tōzato Onda iseki	Ishigaki Island	Ishigaki			24°25′38″N 124°14′46″E		
Takausu Castle Site 高腰城跡; Takausu-jō ato	Miyakojima Island	Miyako			24°47′17″N 125°22′28″E		
Kokugaku - Shuri Seibyō Stone Wall 国学・首里聖廟石垣; Kokugaku・Shuri Seibyō ishigaki	Okinawa Island	Naha			26°13′09″N 127°43′05″E		
Dana Castle Site 田名城跡; Dana-jō ato	Iheya Island	Iheya			27°03′50″N 127°59′14″E		
Undersea Cable Shore Landing Site (Telegraph Station) 海底電線陸揚室跡(電信屋); Kaitei densen rikuage shitsu ato (denshinya)	Ishigaki Island	Ishigaki			24°25′15″N 124°05′10″E		
Thirty-Second Army Headquarters Tunnels (Shuri Headquarters Tunnels) 第32軍司令部壕(首里司令部壕跡); Dai Sanjūni-gun shireibu-gō (Shuri shireibu-gō ato)	Okinawa Island	Naha			26°13′06″N 127°43′04″E		

== Municipal Historic Sites ==
As of 1 May 2025, a further three hundred and nineteen Sites have been designated as being of municipal importance, including:

Site	Island	Municipality	Comments	Image	Coordinates	Type	Ref.
Motobu Observation Post Site 本部監視哨跡; Motobu kanshishō ato	Okinawa Island	Motobu			26°39′23″N 127°53′24″E		for all refs see
Motobu Udun Tomb 本部御殿墓; Motobu Udun-baka	Okinawa Island	Ginowan			26°15′08″N 127°45′29″E		
Maeda Ichirizuka 真栄田の一里塚; Maeda no ichirizuka	Okinawa Island	Onna			26°25′26″N 127°46′01″E		
Nanzan Castle Site 南山城跡; Nanzan-gusuku ato	Okinawa Island	Itoman			26°07′41″N 127°41′22″E		
Tamagusuku Chōkun Tomb 玉城朝薫の墓(邊土名の墓); Tamagusuku Chōkun no haka (Hentona no haka)	Okinawa Island	Urasoe			26°14′17″N 127°43′48″E		
Perry's Banner Rock ペリーの旗立岩; Perī no hata-tate iwa	Okinawa Island	Nakagusuku			26°16′31″N 127°47′18″E		
Naminoue 波上; Naminoue	Okinawa Island	Naha	also a Municipal Place of Scenic Beauty		26°13′14″N 127°40′17″E		
Sakiyama Utaki 崎山御嶽; Sakiyama-utaki	Okinawa Island	Naha			26°12′54″N 127°43′12″E		
Ginowan Udun Tombs 宜野湾御殿の墓及び墓域; Ginowan-udun no haka oyobi boiki	Okinawa Island	Naha			26°13′49″N 127°42′46″E		
Takushi Uekata Tomb 沢岻親方の墓; Takushi Uekata no haka	Okinawa Island	Naha			26°12′45″N 127°42′50″E		
Amamichū Tomb アマミチューの墓; Amamichū no haka	Hamahiga Island	Uruma			26°19′27″N 127°57′59″E		
Henzairi Gusuku 平安座西グスク; Henzairi gusuku	Henza Island	Uruma			26°20′56″N 127°57′07″E		
Yabuchi Cave Site 藪地洞穴遺跡; Yabuchi dōketsu iseki	Yabuchi Island	Uruma			26°18′55″N 127°55′42″E		
Higashionna Museum Site 東恩納博物館跡; Higashionna Hakubutsukan iseki	Okinawa Island	Uruma			26°24′31″N 127°49′47″E		
Uni-Ufugusuku Tomb 鬼大城の墓; Uni-Ufugusuku no haka	Okinawa Island	Okinawa			26°21′46″N 127°48′40″E		
Hōanden 奉安殿; Hōanden	Okinawa Island	Okinawa	Hōanden		26°21′53″N 127°49′11″E		
Monument to the Loyal Dead 忠魂碑; Chūkon-hi	Okinawa Island	Okinawa			26°21′51″N 127°49′12″E		
Murokawa Shell Mound 室川貝塚; Murokawa kaizuka	Okinawa Island	Okinawa			26°20′05″N 127°48′20″E		
Kina Kannondō 喜名観音堂; Kina Kannondō	Okinawa Island	Yomitan			26°24′01″N 127°45′21″E		
Nagahama Shell Mound 長浜貝塚; Nagahama kaizuka	Okinawa Island	Yomitan			26°25′07″N 127°44′30″E		
Tonnaha Castle Site 登武那覇城跡; Tonnaha-gusuku ato	Kume Island	Kumejima			26°20′54″N 126°48′03″E		
Suhara Castle Site スハラ城跡; Suhara-jō ato	Kume Island	Kumejima			26°19′02″N 126°48′04″E		
Nanatake Jinja 七嶽神社; Nanatake Jinja	Kume Island	Kumejima			26°20′49″N 126°44′31″E		
Hōtoku Jinja 報徳神社; Hōtoku Jinja	Kume Island	Kumejima			26°21′37″N 126°43′24″E		
Kubaka Castle Site クバカ城跡; Kubaka-jō ato	Miyakojima Island	Miyakojima			24°43′51″N 125°18′00″E		
Tarama Jinja 多良間神社; Tarama Jinja	Tarama Island	Tarama			24°40′15″N 124°42′01″E		

== Registered Historic Sites ==
As of 3 January 2026, three Monuments have been registered (as opposed to designated) as Historic Sites at a national level.

Site	Island	Municipality	Comments	Image	Coordinates	Type	Ref.
Okinawa Prefectural Railways Yonabaru Station Site 沖縄県鉄道与那原駅跡; Okinawa-ken tetsudō Yonabaru-eki ato	Okinawa Island	Yonabaru			26°11′59″N 127°45′18″E		
Heshikiya Sugar Refining Site 平敷屋製糖工場跡; Heshikiya seitō kōjō ato	Okinawa Island	Uruma			26°22′45″N 127°51′26″E		
Agariō-Oki Site 東奥武沖遺跡; Agariō-Oki iseki	Ōha Island	Kumejima			26°20′13″N 126°50′36″E		

== See also ==
- Cultural Properties of Japan
- Ryūkyū Kingdom
- List of Important Cultural Properties of Japan (Okinawa: structures)
- List of Places of Scenic Beauty of Japan (Okinawa)
- List of Cultural Properties of Japan - paintings (Okinawa)
- Okinawa Prefectural Museum
- Hague Convention for the Protection of Cultural Property in the Event of Armed Conflict
