= Shikina-en =

Hilled gardens south of Shuri Castle in Naha, Okinawa

Coordinates: 26°12′16″N 127°42′55″E

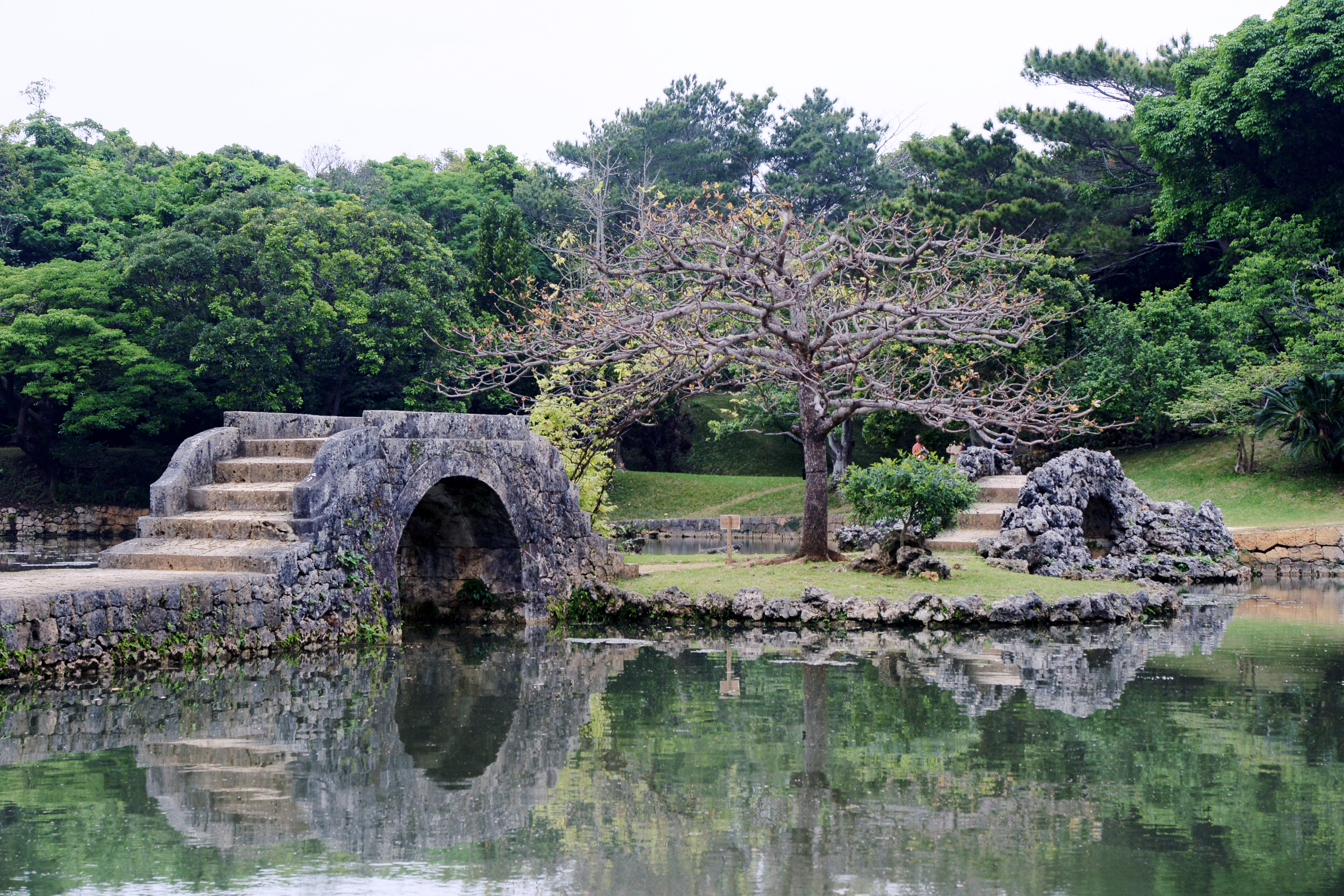
Chinese-style bridges in Shikina-en

Map

The gardens of Shikina-en (識名園) are located on a small hill to the south of Shuri Castle in Naha, Okinawa. The residence and its gardens are also known as Sichina-nu-udun (Okinawan: 識名御殿/シチナヌウドゥン) or Nan'en (Okinawan: 南苑, ナンエン, lit. 'the Southern Gardens'), as opposed to the Tōen (Okinawan: 東苑/トーエン, lit. 'the Eastern Gardens') of Uchaya-udun (Okinawan: 御茶屋御殿/ウチャヤ ウドゥン), laid out on a small hill east of Shuri Castle in 1677. In 1992 Hiroshi Shō, the great-grandson of Shō Tai, the last king of the Ryūkyū Kingdom, donated the royal mausoleum of Tamaudun and Shikina-en to the City of Naha.

== Design ==
The Japanese-style stroll garden features a pond with two small islands; a Chinese-style hexagonal pavilion; other pavilions with red tiles, the use of which was reserved for the upper classes; Chinese-style arched bridges; and seasonal plantings of plum, wisteria, and bellflower. This blend of Japanese and Chinese design and features has been acclaimed as "uniquely Ryukyuan" by UNESCO and advisory body ICOMOS.

== History ==
The gardens were laid out in 1799 to embellish one of the residences of the Shō family, rulers of the Ryūkyū Kingdom; they were used for the reception of an envoy from China the following year. First designated for protection in 1941 in accordance with the 1919 Law, they were completely destroyed during the Battle of Okinawa. Restoration began in 1975 and took around twenty years, at a cost of some eight hundred million yen. In 1976 the gardens were once again designated a Place of Scenic Beauty; in 2000 they were re-designated a Special Place of Scenic Beauty and included within the inscription of the UNESCO World Heritage Site Gusuku Sites and Related Properties of the Kingdom of Ryukyu. The gardens stretch over an area of 4.2 ha and the UNESCO nomination includes a buffer zone of a further 84.2 ha.

== See also ==
- List of Historic Sites of Japan (Okinawa)
- List of Important Cultural Properties of Japan (Okinawa: structures)
- List of Special Places of Scenic Beauty, Special Historic Sites and Special Natural Monuments
- World Heritage Sites in Japan
- Fukushūen

== Bibliography ==
- Mansfield, Stephen (2011). Japan's Master Gardens - Lessons in Space and Environment (Hardback). Tokyo, Rutland, Singapore: Tuttle. ISBN 978-4-8053-1128-8.
