= Kunigami Hōsei Kaidō =

Road in Okinawa Prefecture, Japan

Kunigami Hōseikaidō
- 国頭方西海道 (Okinawan)
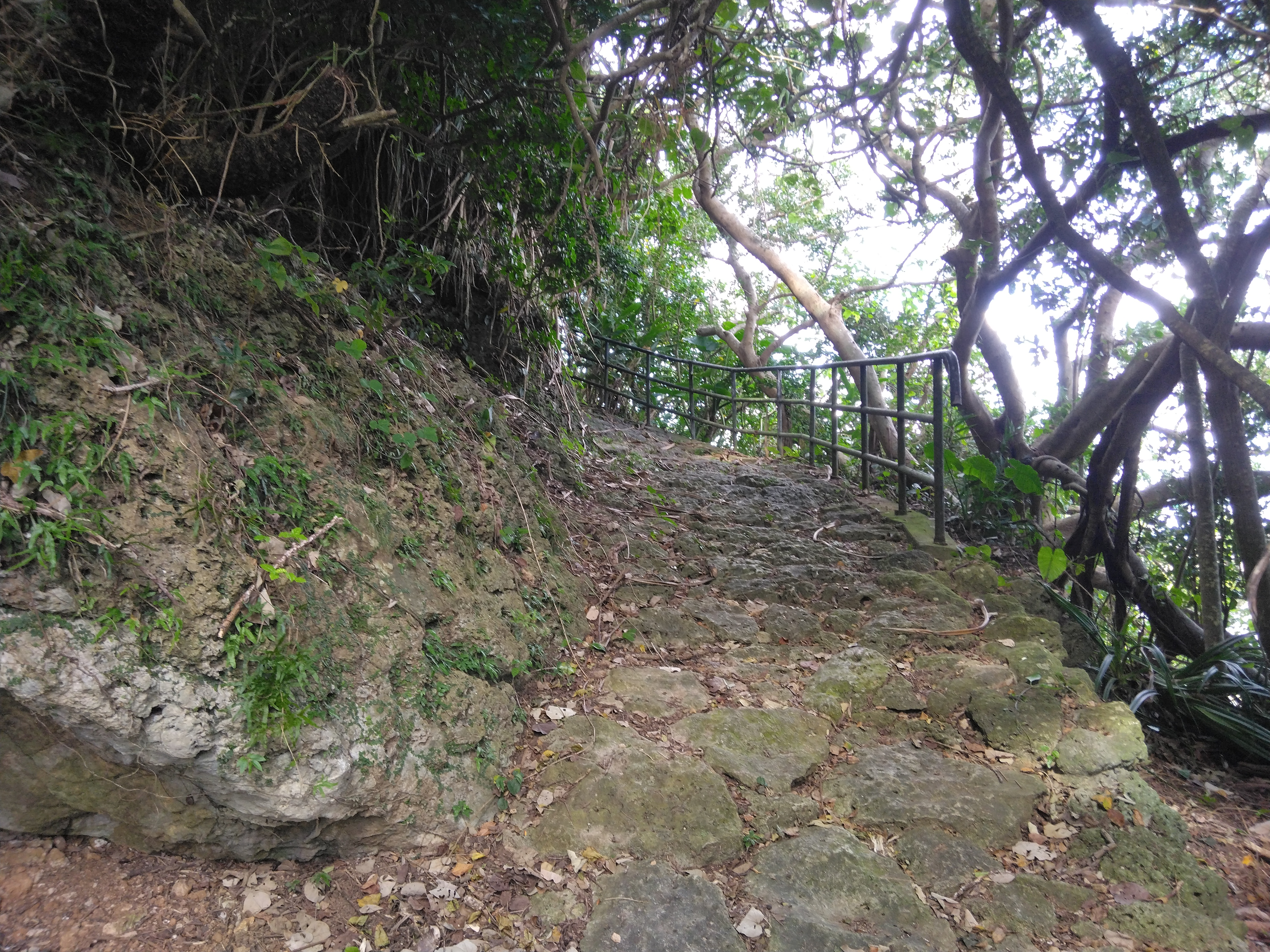
- Entrance to Hiyagonbira paved road in Nakadomari
- Type: Road remnants
- Location: Naha to Kunigami, Okinawa, Japan

History
- Built: late 15th century

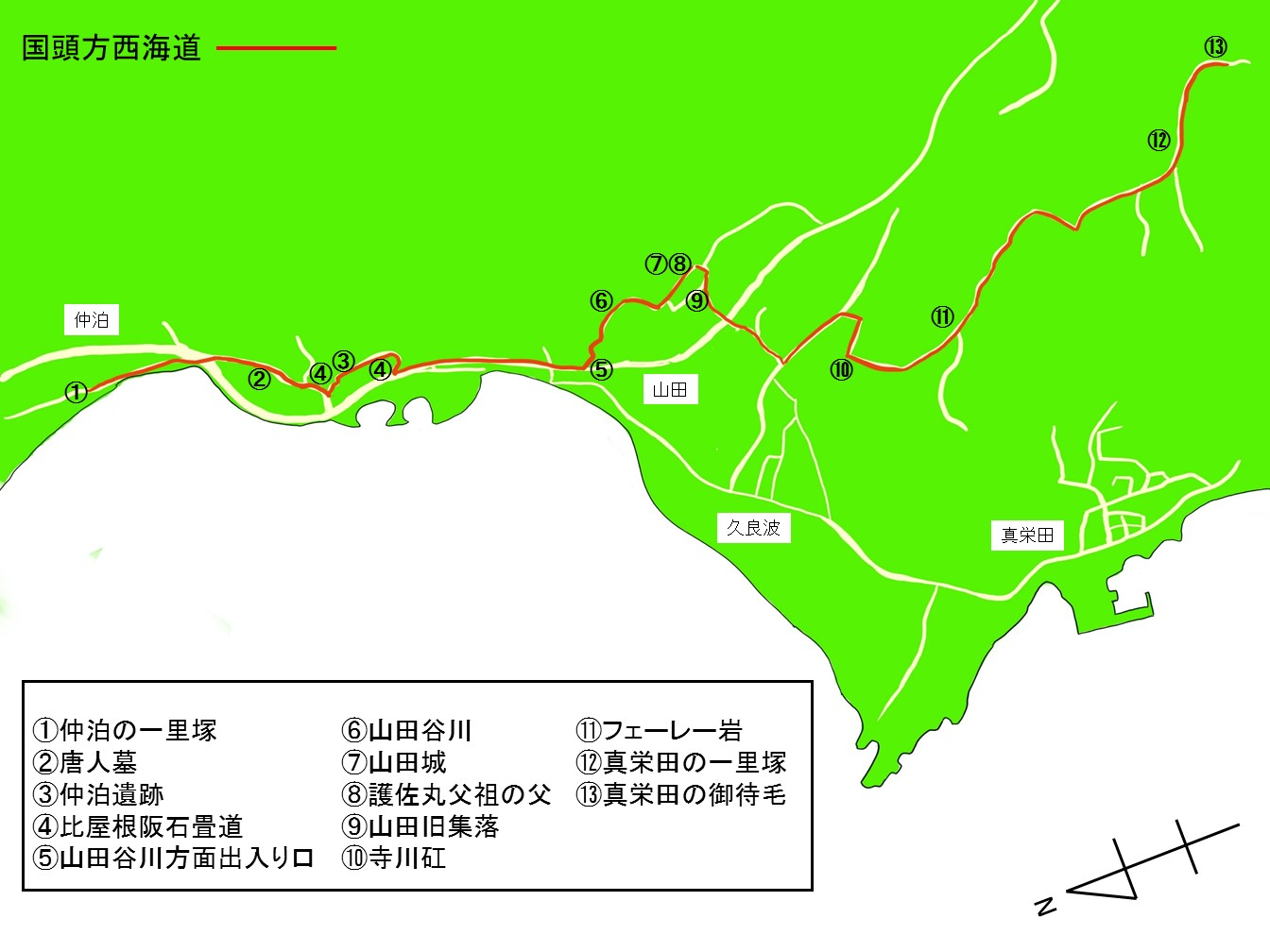
Map of a portion of the Kunigami Hōseikaidō

The Kunigami Hōseikaidō (国頭方西海道) is a historical road on Okinawa Island, Japan. Built by the Ryūkyū Kingdom, it begins at Shuri Castle, passes through Mount Urasoe, Onna and Nago continues to the Kunigami region, connecting local administrative guard posts. The road partially overlaps with modern Japan National Route 58. In 2004, a relatively well preserved 1.3 kilometers of the road was designated a National Historic Site.

== History ==
The Kunigami Hōsei Kaidō was one of the four major roads built during the Ryūkyū Kingdom era. These were: the Nakagami-Hōseikaido and Kunigami-Hōseikaidō, which run along the west side of Okinawa Island, and the Nakagami-Hōtōkaidō and the Kunigami-Hōtōkaidō, which run along the east side. The road that runs from Kina in Yomitan through Onna and continues toward Kunigami was called the "Kumigami Hōseikaidō." During the Second Shō Dynasty from the late 15th century onward, this road network centered on Shuri was strategically important for the transmission of royal orders and supplies.

The Kumigami Hōseikaidō is approximately 2.4 meters wide and lined with pine trees on both sides. The route runs from Kina Bansho to Onna Bansho and Nago Bansho, splitting at Nago toward Motobu Bansho and Haneji Bansho. There are two routes: one from Motobu Bansho and Haneji Bansho to Nakijin Bansho, and the other from Haneji Bansho to Kunigami Bansho via Ogimi Bansho. This route runs through what are now Yomitan , Onna, Nago, Motobu , Nakijin , Ogimi , and Kunigami . The portion covered under the National Historic Site designation includes the Hiyagonbira Stone-Paved Road, Umachimo, Maeda, and Nakadomari ichirizuka, and Ishibashi stone bridge.

=== Hiyagonbira Stone-Paved Road ===
This stone-paved portion of the Kumigami Hōseikaidō is said to have been the site of a battle during the Satsuma Domain's Invasion of Ryūkyū in 1609. Its width ranges from 1.5 to 3 meters. Said to have been in use from approximately 400 years ago until the end of the Meiji period, the stone pavement continues all the way to the remains of rock shelter dwellings at the Nakadomari ruins.

=== Nakadomari ichirizuka and Maeda ichirizuka ===
In Onna, artificial mounds were erected at each one ri intervals to serve as guideposts for travelers. Five ichirizuka were established: the Maeda ichirizuka , Nakadomari ichirizuka , Tancha ichirizuka , Minami-Onna no Baba ichirizuka , Yasufuso ichirizuka , and Nakamahamahara ichirizuka . However, due to construction work to expand the highway, these milestones were eliminated, and only Nakadomari ichirizuka and Maeda ichirizuka remain today. It is unclear whether there were any ichirizuka erected outside of Onna Village. Nakadomari's ichirizuka consist of two mounds: one on the north side, utilizing natural features and a Ryūkyū limestone hill, and one on the south side. The Maeda ichirizuka is an earthen mound made of a mixture of soil and charcoal, with Ryūkyū pines and other trees planted on top. They were originally paired on both ends of the road, but one of the mounds was destroyed for land reclamation.

=== Ishibashi Stone Bridge ===
The Ishibashi Stone Bridge is stone arch bridge spanning the Yaga River below the cliffs north of Yamada Castle.

== See also ==
- List of Historic Sites of Japan (Okinawa)
