= Uzahama Site =

Archaeological site in Kunigami, Okinawa, Japan

- 宇佐浜遺跡 (Japanese)
- Uzahama Site Uzahama Site (Japan)
- Interactive map of Uzahama Site
- 26°51′58.5″N 128°15′36.7″E
- Type: Settlement
- Periods: Shellmidden
- Location: Kunigami, Okinawa, Japan
- Region: Okinawa

Site notes
- Public access: Yes

The Uzahama Site (宇佐浜遺跡, Uzahama iseki) is an archaeological site with traces of a Jōmon to Yayoi Period settlement, located in the Hedo neighborhood of the village of Kunigami, Okinawa Prefecture Japan. It was designated a National Historic Site of Japan in 1972.

== Overview ==
The Uzahama site is located near the tip of Kunigami Peninsula on northernmost tip of Okinawa Island, overlooking the sea with cliffs over 20 meters high, and the site is located on a gentle slope directly above these cliffs, overlooking a sandy beach and coral lagoon below the cliff, with Mount Asumui (also known as Kuganimui), known for its creation myth, in the background.

Archaeological excavations conducted by the Government of the Ryūkyū Islands in 1970 uncovered what appeared to be the remains of a pit dwelling dug into the red clay flats and a stone dwelling with rows of stones, along with shell mounds, as well as pottery and stone tools. A jar-shaped, pointed-bottomed vessel dating to the late Ryūkyū Jōmon pottery period was also unearthed. This vessel, known as "Usahama-style" pottery, is believed to be the oldest pointed-bottomed vessel excavated in Okinawa. This type of pottery is also found in the Amami Islands, where it is known as the "Ujuku Jojo style". Stone tools include stone axes, grinding stones, and stone plates made from stone mined in the Kunigami region. The site is estimated to date to the end of the Jōmon period or the beginning of the Yayoi period on the mainland, and is said to be a representative site showcasing the prehistoric period of the southern islands, which corresponds to the transition between the two periods.

== See also ==
- List of Historic Sites of Japan (Okinawa)
