= Ogidō Shell Mound =

Ogidō Shell Midden
- 荻堂貝塚 (Japanese)
- Ogidō Shell Midden Ogidō Shell Mound (Japan)
- Interactive map of Ogidō Shell Midden
- 26°17′34.4″N 127°47′55.3″E
- Type: shell midden
- Periods: Shellmidden
- Location: Kitanakagusuku, Okinawa, Japan
- Region: Okinawa

Site notes
- Public access: Yes (no facilities at site)

The Ogidō Shell Midden (荻堂貝塚, Ogidō kaizuka) is an archaeological site in what is now the Ogido Ushirohara neighborhood of the village of Kitanakagusuku, Okinawa Prefecture, Japan. The site was designated and a National Historic Site in 1972. It is one of the oldest shell mounds in Okinawa Prefecture dating to the Early Shellmidden Period.

== Overview ==
During the early Shellmidden Period (approximately 4000 to 2500 BC), sea levels were five to six meters higher than at present, and the ambient temperature was also 2 deg C higher. During this period, the Ryukyu Islands was inhabited by the Jōmon people, many of whom lived in coastal settlements. The middens associated with such settlements contain bone, botanical material, mollusc shells, sherds, lithics, and other artifacts and ecofacts associated with the now-vanished inhabitants, and these features, provide a useful source into the diets and habits of Shellmidden Period society.

The Ogidō Shell Mound is located on the lower slope of a cliff in a Ryūkyū limestone hill at an elevation of approximately 135 meters in central Okinawa Island. Archaeological excavations were conducted by Tokyo Imperial University in 1919, and found that he site has a topsoil layer (cultivated soil) of approximately 30-cm, an artifact-bearing layer of 70–100 cm, and a limestone bedrock beneath. The shell layer reached a thickness of 1.2 meters at its thickest point. In addition to shellfish, fish bones, and animal bones, stone tools, pottery, and shell artifacts have been excavated. Land-dwelling snails were also prominent, suggesting they were an important food source.

The pottery is deep, bowl-shaped, with four protrusions on the rim and a small, flat base. The patterns are only applied to the upper half of the vessel, consisting of pairs of two lines or dots that circle the vessel as connected lines or dots, and sawtooth patterns are also frequently used. These pottery vessels, named "Ogidō Style," are considered one of the most representative forms of pottery from the early Okinawa shell mound period and have become a standard reference for research into the prehistoric period of the southern islands. These patterns are notable for their similarity to Sobata-style pottery in Kyushu and pottery from the Okitsu Shell Mound in Chiba Prefecture, and date to the Late Jōmon period on the mainland.

== See also ==
- List of Historic Sites of Japan (Okinawa)
