= Kabira Shell Mound =

Archaeological site in Iejima, Okinawa, Japan

Kabira Shell Midden
- 川平貝塚 (Japanese)
- Kabira Shell Midden Kabira Shell Mound (Japan)
- Interactive map of Kabira Shell Midden
- 24°28′01″N 124°07′58″E
- Type: shell midden
- Location: Ishigaki, Okinawa, Japan
- Region: Okinawa

Site notes
- Public access: Yes (no facilities at site)

The Kabira Shell Midden (川平貝塚, Kabira kaizuka) is an archaeological site in what is now the Kabira neighborhood of the city of Ishigaki, Okinawa Prefecture, Japan. The site was designated a National Historic Site in 1986.

== Overview ==
The Kabira Shell Mound is located on a low, independent hill in the center of the peninsula that juts northwest of Ishigaki Island, separating Kabira Bay and Sakieda Bay. It was first excavated in 1904 by Tokyo University’s Dr Torii Ryuzo, and was the first site discovered in the Yaeyama Islands.

The site is considered important for understanding the culture of the Sakishima Islands, which differs from that of the Okinawa Islands, having a stronger connection to the Jōmon people of mainland Japan.

Artifacts discovered in the midden include pottery, celadon, stone axes, concave stones, stone pestles, stone plates, shell plates and shells, and mammal and fish bones. Yaeyama pottery is clearly distinct from that of Okinawa's main island, instead suggesting a connection to Taiwan, most notably to the Yami tribe of Orchid Island. The pottery’s horizontal handles are an important characteristic of Yaeyama pottery, leading to its being named "outer ear pottery.”

Based on the discovery of Chinese celadon pottery, the site is estimated to date to the 15th or 16th century.

== See also ==
- List of Historic Sites of Japan (Okinawa)
