= Yamato Spring =

Well in Miyakojima, Okinawa, Japan

Yamato Well
- 大和井; Yamatu-gaa
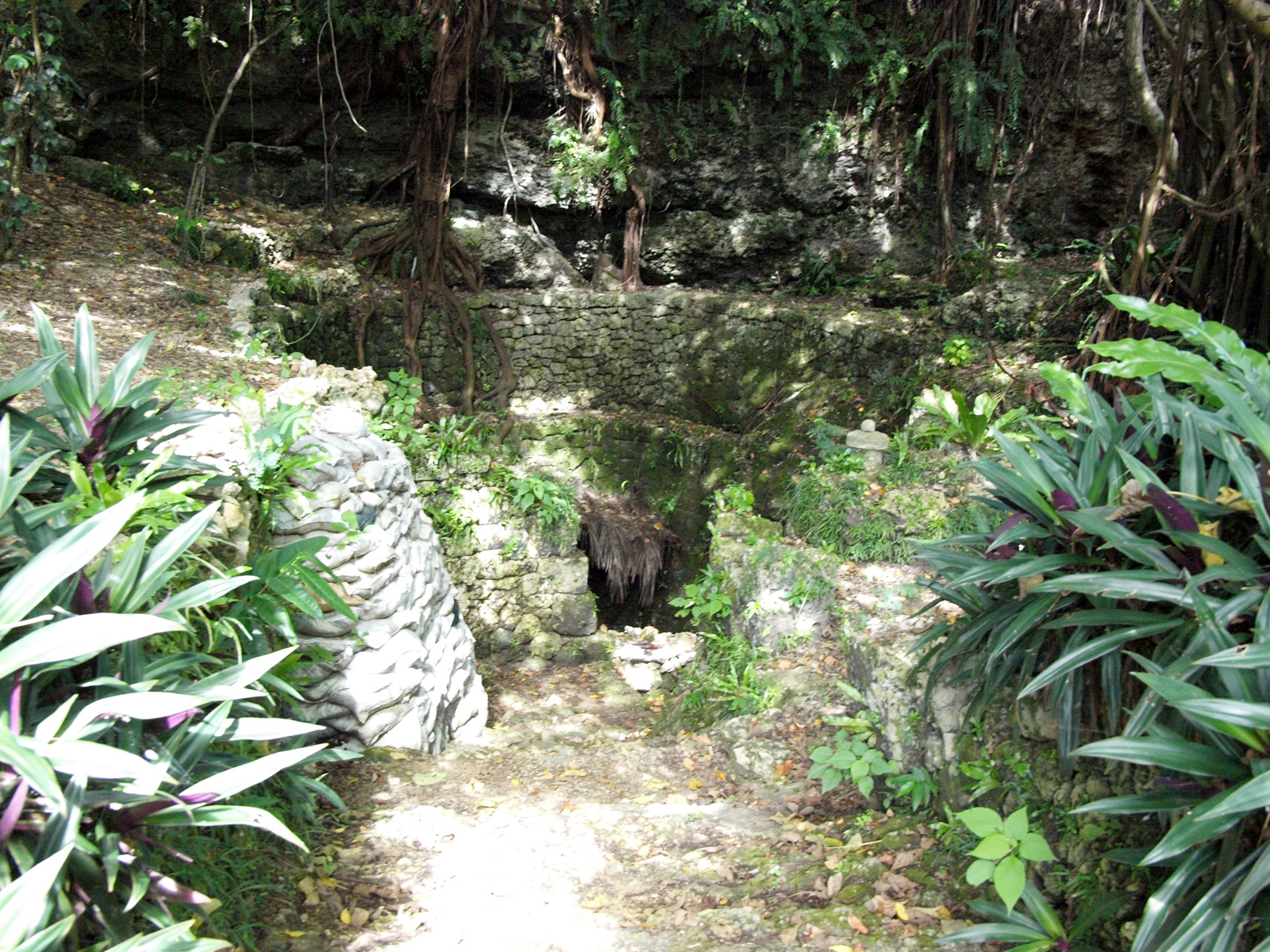
- Yamato Well entrance

- Yamato Well Yamato Spring (Japan)
- Interactive map of Yamato Well
- 24°48′39″N 125°17′8.3″E
- Location: Miyakojima, Okinawa, Japan
- Region: Okinawa

Site notes
- Public access: Yes

The Yamato Spring (Miyako: 大和井/ヤマトゥ ガー, romanized: Yamatu-gaa) is a well, located in the Hirara neighborhood of the city of Miyakojima, Okinawa Prefecture, Japan. It was designated a National Historic Site of Japan in 1992 together with the nearby Butora Well.

== Overview ==
Miyakojima island, a raised coral reef, has no rivers. Instead, rainwater springs up from underground sources near the coast, often referred to as "gaa" (wells or springs). These springs have been used since prehistoric times to provide water for the daily life of the inhabitants. The Yamato Well was dug around 1720. Yamatoi is a descending well located at the bottom of a 20-meter-circumference, 6-meter-high circular stone hole lined with large and small cut stones . A stone-paved plaza is set at the bottom, serving as the water intake. Winding stone steps lead up to the plaza. Remains of a bolt, presumably a gate, remain halfway up the steps, suggesting that access was strictly controlled. Legend has it that this well was reserved for officials dispatched from the Shuri Royal Court and Satsuma Domain.

The Butora Well is a simpler well located about 50 meters northwest of the Yamato Well. It is thought to have been used by ordinary residents. About 40 meters southwest of Yamato Well is a well called Upugaa, which was reserved for cattle and horses.

== See also ==
- List of Historic Sites of Japan (Okinawa)
