= Gushibaru Shell Mound =

Archaeological site in Iejima, Okinawa, Japan

Gushibaru Shell Midden
- 具志原貝塚 (Japanese)
- Gushibaru Shell Midden Gushibaru Shell Mound (Japan)
- 26°42′30″N 127°48′03″E
- Type: shell midden
- Periods: Jōmon - Yayoi period
- Location: Ie, Okinawa, Japan
- Region: Okinawa

Site notes
- Public access: Yes (no facilities at site)
- National Historic Site of Japan

The Gushibaru Shell Midden (具志原貝塚, Gushibaru kaizuka) is an archaeological site in what is now the Kabira neighborhood of the village of Ie, Okinawa Prefecture, Japan. The site was designated a prefectural historic site in 1974 and a National Historic Site in 1986, with the area under protection expanded in 1998. The site is known for being where Kyushu-produced Yayoi pottery was first discovered in Okinawa.

== Overview ==
During the early to middle Jōmon period (approximately 4000 to 2500 BC), sea levels were five to six meters higher than at present, and the ambient temperature was also 2 degrees Celsius higher. During this period, The Ryukyu islands were inhabited by the Jōmon people, many of whom lived in coastal settlements. The shell middens associated with such settlements contain bone, botanical material, mollusc shells, sherds, lithics, and other artifacts and ecofacts associated with the now-vanished inhabitants. These features provide a useful source into the diets and habits of Jōmon society.

The Gushibaru Shell Mound is located on a sand dune facing Ie Port on the southern coast of Iejima. The site has clear stratification, with an abundance of artifacts, beginning in the Early Jōmon period, and spanning the Late Jōmon, Final Jōmon, and Yayoi periods.

The layer of striated pottery corresponding to the Early Jōmon period make it the oldest Neolithic site on Iejima, dating back 5,000 years. However, it is most noted for the large number of semi-finished and finished products made from various clam shells, including shell rings, shell plates, shell bells, and shell tags in the same strata as Suku (Yamanoguchi) and Menda-style Yayoi pottery from the Kyushu. This indicates a flourishing maritime trade between mainland Japan and Okinawa during this period.

Human remains from early Gusuku period (direct radiocarbon dating is mid-11th century to early 13th century) have also been discovered.

== Access ==
The site is about a 30-minute drive from Motobu Port.

== See also ==
- List of Historic Sites of Japan (Okinawa)
