= Nakagami Hōsei Kaidō =

Road in Okinawa Prefecture, Japan

Nakagami Hōseikaidō
- 中頭方西海道及び普天間参詣道 (Okinawan)
- Type: Road remnants
- Location: Naha to Kunigami, Okinawa, Japan

History
- Built: late 15th century

The Nakagami Hōseikaidō (中頭方西海道及び普天間参詣道, Nakagami hōsei kaidō oyobi Futenma sankei michi) is a historical road on Okinawa Island, Japan. Built by the Ryūkyū Kingdom, it begins at Shuri Castle, passes through Hirara and Urasoe continues to Yomitan, Onna and the Kunigami region, connecting local administrative guard posts. In 2012, a relatively well preserved 187 meter section of the road near to Kowan River was designated a National Historic Site.

== History ==
The Nakagami Hōsei Kaidō was one of the four major roads built during the Ryūkyū Kingdom era. During the Second Shō Dynasty from the late 15th century onward, this road network centered on Shuri was strategically important for the transmission of royal orders and supplies. Per a stone monument erected in front of Urasoe Castle in 1597, the road was constructed during the reign of King Shō Nei, who had the route from Shuri Castle to Urasoe Castle paved with stones, and replaced the wooden Taira Bridge with a stone bridge.

The two stone brides on the upper reaches of the Kowan River are known as Ahacha Bridges. They are believed to have existed around 1597, when the road from Shuri Castle to Urasoe Castle was constructed. However, judging from artifacts excavated during archaeological excavations and the construction method of the bridges, it has been determined that North Bridge dates to the 18th or 19th century, while South Bridge dates to the Meiji period or later. It is possible that the bridges have been repaired or replaced over the years.The North Bridge is characterized by its open, bell-shaped design when viewed from the front. The arch is made of three wide pieces of Ryukyu limestone. The South Bridge was destroyed during the 1945 Battle of Okinawa, but excavations revealed that its arch was made of seven short pieces of Ryukyu limestone and that the bridge was a camelback bridge (a bridge with a bulging center resembling a camel's back). The Western-style arch suggests that the bridge was renovated after the Meiji period.

== Futenma Pilgrimage Route ==
The Futenma Pilgrimage Route branches off from the Nakagami-Saikaido and leads to Futenma Shrine. Since King Shō Ken began making pilgrimages to Futenma in 1644, it is believed that the route existed around that time. The well-preserved, approximately 210-meter cobblestone road running north and south along the Toyama River is known as the Futenma Pilgrimage Route, and is also part of the National Historic Site designation. It was the customer of the kings of Ryūkyū to make the pilgrimage every September, since September was considered a month of frequent dangers (disasters). The King rode in a palanquin to and from Futenma Shrine, accompanied by the prince and important courtiers.

== See also ==
- List of Historic Sites of Japan (Okinawa)
