= Ikeda Bridge =

Limestone bridge in Miyakojima, Okinawa

Coordinates: 24°45′12″N 125°17′8″E

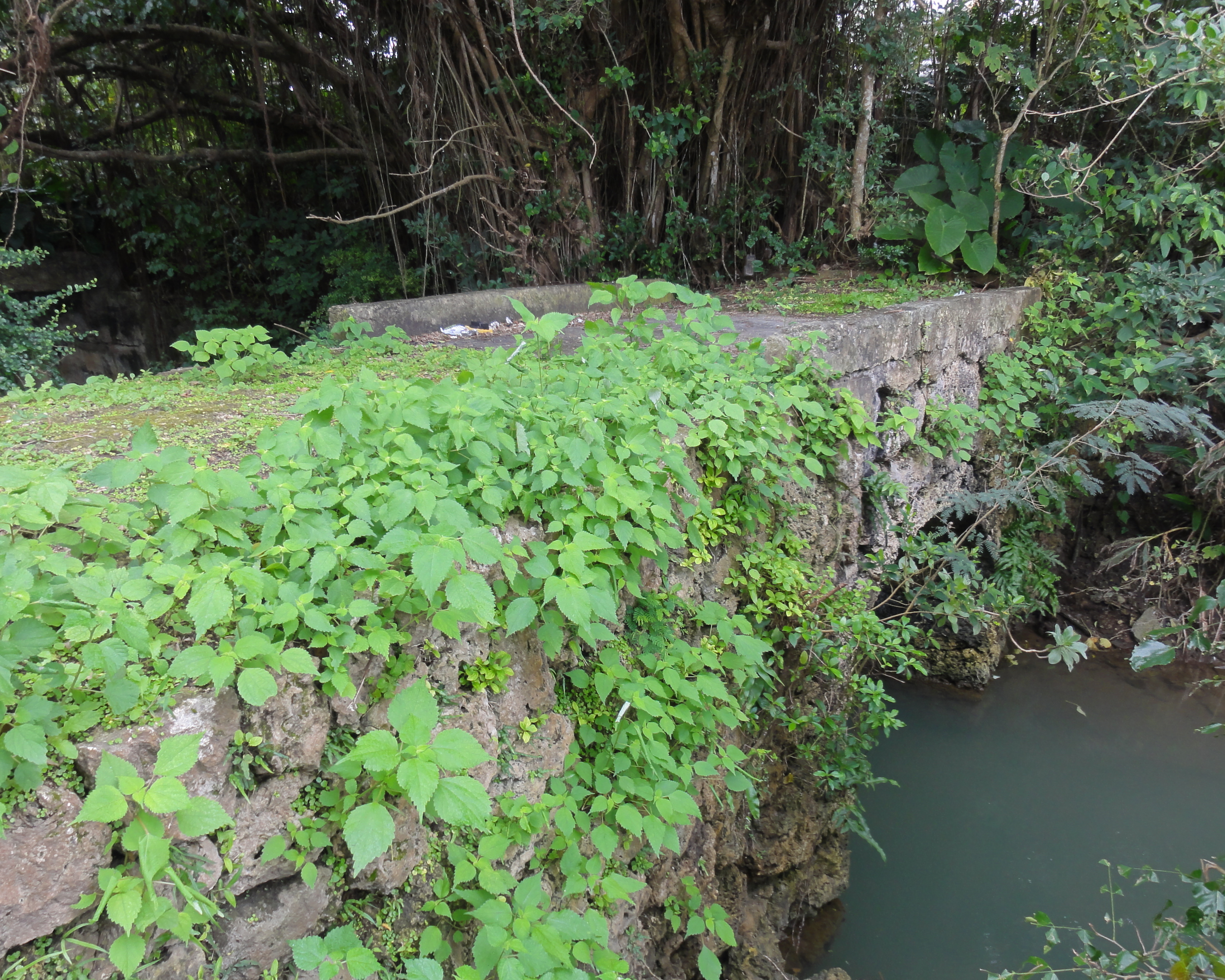
Ikeda-bashi on the island of Miyakojima

The Ikeda Bridge (池田矼, Ikeda-bashi) is a 10-metre long, 3-metre wide, arched, Ryūkyū limestone (琉球石灰岩) bridge near the mouth of the Sakita River in Miyakojima, Okinawa Prefecture, Japan. It is the only bridge of its kind on the island of Miyakojima and was designated a Prefectural Historic Site in July 1977. It is one of the extra 20 bridges of "100 Noted Bridges in Japan".

== History ==
The Ikeda bridge is said to have been built in the era of the Zhengde Emperor around 1506-1521 together with another bridge, Shimojiba Suuntu, which was later swept away. The first documentary evidence for the bridge is the 1727 Diary of the Yousei Age (雍正旧記, Yōsei-kyūki), the era of the Yongzheng Emperor. The bridge was repaired in 1817.

== See also ==
- Megane Bridge
- Sakishima Beacons
- List of Historic Sites of Japan (Okinawa)
