= Kitadaitōjima Phosphate Mine =

Former mine in Japan

Coordinates: 25°57′14″N 131°17′0.6″E

Kitadaitōjima Phosphate Mine 北大東島燐鉱山
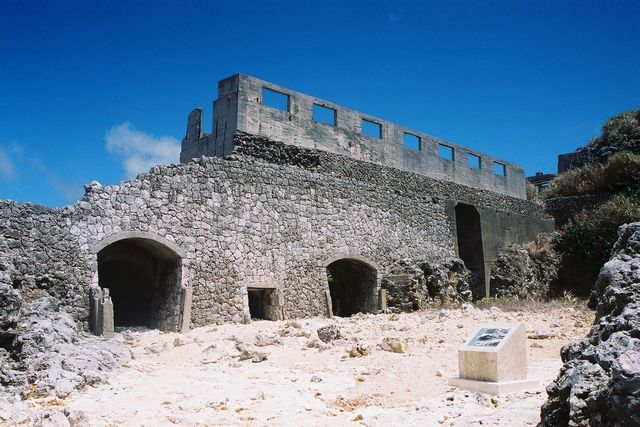

- Kitadaitōjima Phosphate Mine Kitadaitōjima Phosphate Mine (Japan)
- Location: Okinawa Prefecture, Japan
- Products: phosphate
- Opened: 1919
- Closed: 1950
- Company: Toyo Sugar / Dai Nihon Sugar
- National Historic Site of Japan

The Kitadaitōjima Phosphate Mine (北大東島燐鉱山遺, Kitadaitōjima rinkōzan) is a former phosphate mine located on the island of Kitadaitōjima, in the Philippine Sea southeast of Okinawa, Japan. It is administratively within the borders of the village of Kitadaitō, Shimajiri District, Okinawa Prefecture. The mine closed in 1950, and in 2017, it was designated as a National Historic Site.

== History ==
Kitadaitōjima, located approximately 360 kilometers east of Okinawa Island, was uninhabited until claimed by the Empire of Japan in 1885. In 1900, a team of pioneers from Hachijōjima, an island located 287 kilometres (178 mi) south of Tokyo led by Tamaoki Han'emon (1838 – 1910), who had pioneered settlement on Minamidaitōjima, became the first human inhabitants of the islands, and started the cultivation of sugar cane from 1903. During this period until World War II, Kitadaitōjima was owned in its entirety by Dai Nippon Sugar. In 1903, Noritaka Tsuneto, whose life's work was exploring Japan's phosphate resources, discovered phosphate rock on Okidaitōjima, in 1906 and began development. Tsuneto also sent his subordinates to Kitadaitōjima to conduct a resource survey and discovered also discovered phosphate rock there. These deposits, primarily composed of aluminium phosphate, centered in the northeastern part of the island, which had formed from guano deposited by seabird droppings over many millennia. However, it was determined that commercialization would be difficult due to a high iron-aluminum content. Undeterred, Tamaki also began development of a phosphate mine on Kitadaitōjima, but as predicted, the venture ended in failure. After Tamaki Han'emon's death, management rights on Kitadaitōjima and Minamidaitōjima Islands were transferred to Toyo Sugar, a sugar manufacturing company affiliated with Suzuki Shoten. Seeing the success of the phosphate mining business on Okidaitōjima during World War I, Toyo Sugar decided to once again embark on phosphate mining on Kitadaitōjima. The mine began operations in May 1919. While the company struggled initially, it continued to study ways to utilize Kitadaitōjima's abundant aluminium phosphate ore. It became clear that the high-quality ore, with its high phosphorus content, could be used as a raw material for pure phosphorus, and that the lower quality ore could be used as a raw material for alumina phosphate fertilizer. Research also continued into recycling the aluminum contained in the ore. These developments made the mine economically feasible. As operations progressed, a mining town developed in the northwestern part of Kitadaitōjima, home to Toyo Sugar employees, miners, and their families. Initially, miners from Taiwan also employed, but soon the majority of the workforce was made up of miners from Okinawa Prefecture. While initially many miners were single, an increasing number of them eventually started families. While the number of miners varied from year-to-year, an average of approximately 300 miners were employed.

The company housing district was established in 1919 near the port where phosphate ore was loaded. The housing district consisted of over 20 buildings, including a detached director's residence, a doctor's residence, and tenement-style employee housing. The buildings were wooden, Japanese-style, and surrounded by dolomite stone walls. The executive-level housing had indoor baths, and a communal bathhouse for employees was also built. The company's Kitadaitōjima branch office, where employees worked, was also established within the housing district, and a store selling daily necessities was attached to the branch office. Facilities necessary for maintaining and managing mining equipment, such as a woodworking workshop and repair shop, were also established. A hospital, a police station for petition police officers, and a radio station were also built within the housing district. The housing district also contained commercial facilities such as a fish market, and electricity was supplied from a power plant. Two clubhouses were also built, one for employees and one for temporary workers. A sports field and tennis courts were also built. When the mine first opened, the majority of miners were single, so the company built several tin-roofed tenement-style dormitories with company-operated kitchens on the south side of the housing area. As the number of married miners increased, more homes for miners were built around the dormitories, and the area developed into a settlement. The then-director of Toyo Sugar's Kitadaitōjima branch office named this settlement "Taishō Village." As the mine developed, miners' housing expanded north of the housing area, and the miners' settlement on the north side of the housing area came to be called "Shimosaka Village" after the then-president of Toyo Sugar.

In 1927, amid the Showa Financial Crisis, Suzuki Shoten went bankrupt. Toyo Sugar was absorbed into Dainihon Sugar Company. As wartime conditions worsened, the phosphate mines on Kitadaitōjima were considered of strategic importance. Furthermore, to explore the prospect of commercializing aluminum production using Kitadaitōjima's aluminium phosphate ore, Dainihon Sugar established Nitto Chemical Industry Company in 1937 and constructed the a plant in Hachinohe, Aomori prefecture to process the ore. Production peaked in 1942, exceeding 70,000 tons. However, as the war situation worsened, marine transportation became increasingly difficult from the latter half of 1943, and the mines' operations also became difficult. After the war, the Ryūkyū Islands and Kitadaitōjima came under U.S. Military occupation. The Americans brought in heavy machinery to increase production; however, the use of heavy machinery resulted in a decline in the quality of the ore, leading to poor sales and the mine's closure in 1950. In total, approximately 774,000 tons were extracted. Although talk of reopening the mine subsequently arose, it never materialized. After the mine's closure, the mine town became deserted, but mining-related buildings remained, particularly in the company housing complex where employees lived.

Japan has few phosphate mines, and the mine of Okidaitōjima became a U.S. military firing range after the war, leaving almost no remains related to the mine. Phosphate mining was also conducted on the Noto Peninsula, Minamitorishima, Hateruma Island, and other islands, but these were all small-scale operations, and no significant remains remain.Kitadaitōjima's mine ruins, believed to be the only one of its kind in Japan, had its mining-related buildings registered as a Registered Tangible Cultural Properties between 2005 and 2007. In 2017, the mine ruins were designated a historic site.

== Historic Site designation ==
After the mine closed, much of the site was converted into agricultural land, including sugarcane fields. Large sinkholes within the mine area were converted into reservoirs, and some were used as landfills for waste disposal. Taishō Village, located to the south of the company housing complex where miners and their families lived, and Shimosaka Village, located to the north, rapidly declined after the mines closed, and were initially used by agricultural cooperatives as cattle pastures. Currently, part of the former Taishō Village has been converted into Nishiko Park, and the area that was Shimosaka Village is now a sugarcane field. Meanwhile, the former company housing district still retains its former vestiges, including the former employee club, Nirokuso, which is now a guesthouse, and the former Kitadaitōjima Branch Office, which was renovated and remodeled into a community center in September 2015. While the buildings themselves are gone, many dolomite stone walls remain. Many of the mine-related facilities were abandoned and unused after the mine closed, and have suffered destruction and damage from typhoons.

=== Historic Site Designation and Registered Tangible Cultural Properties ===
National Historic Site

- Remaining Phosphate Mine Site
- Remaining Trolley Tracks
- Remaining Sun-Drying Deposit Site
- Remaining Dryer Site
- Remaining Crusher Site
- Remaining Storage Facility
- Remaining Loading Pier
- Remaining Unloading Area
- Remaining Boat Landing Site
- Remaining Barge Warehouse

Registered Tangible Cultural Properties

- Remaining Phosphate Loading Pier
- Remaining Phosphate Storage Facility
- Former Kitadaitōjima Branch Office (now Rinko Community Center)
- Former Fish Market (now Sueyoshi Residence)
- Former Employee Club (now Nirokuso)
- Former Employee Public Bath
- Former Shimosaka Village Public Bath (Miners' Public Bath)

== See also ==
- List of Historic Sites of Japan (Okinawa)
