= Mekaru Tomb Cluster =

Historic cemetery in Okinawa Prefecture, Japan

- 銘苅墓跡群
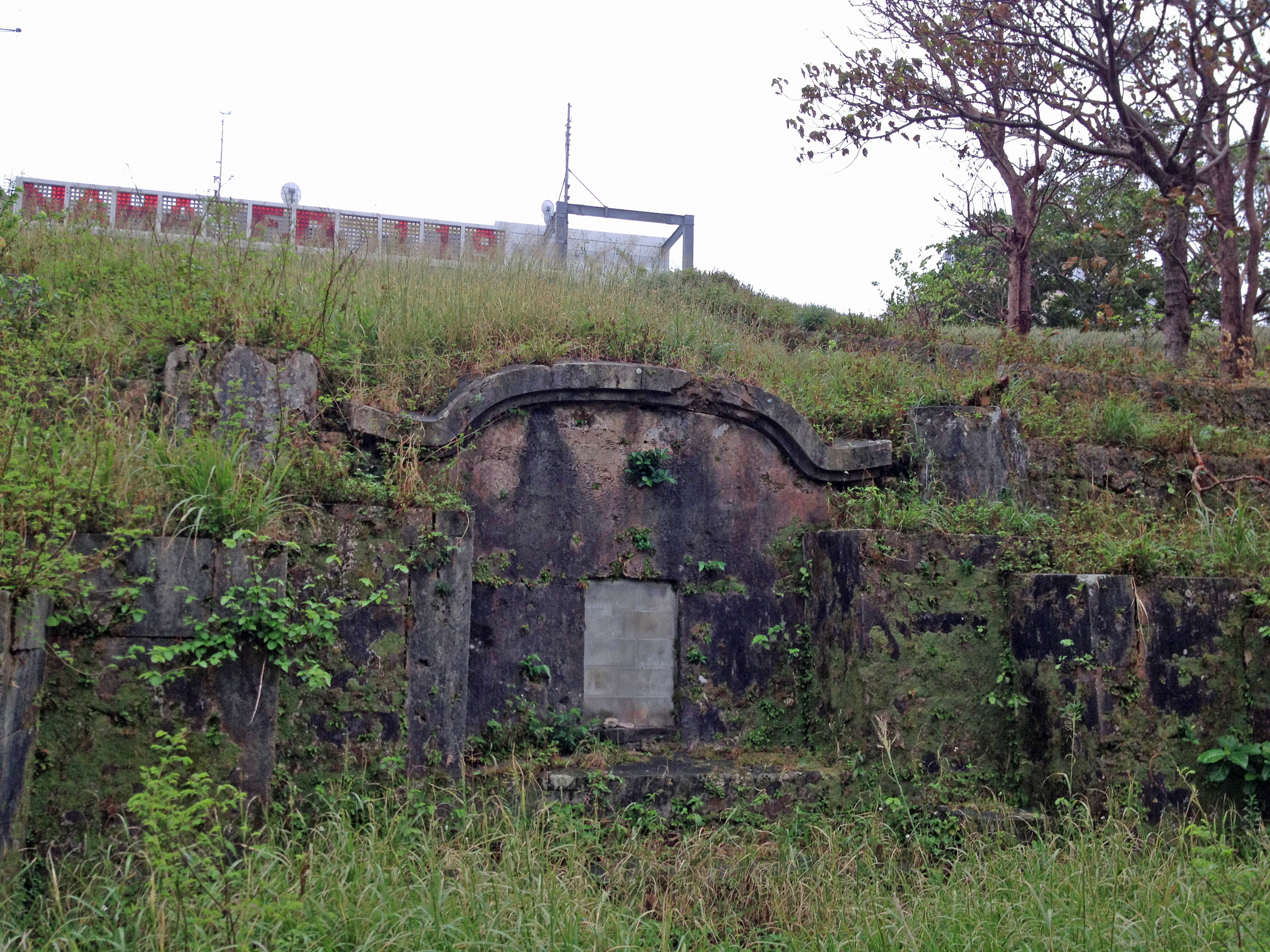
- Izena Dunchi Tomb

- Location within Okinawa Prefecture Location within Japan

Details
- Location: Naha, Okinawa
- Country: Japan
- Coordinates: 26°13′50″N 127°41′51″E
- Type: cemetery
- Footnotes: National Historic Site of Japan

The Mekaru Tomb Cluster (銘苅墓跡群, Mekaru haka ato gun) is a cluster of approximately 330 tombs spanning the gusuku era, Ryūkyū Kingdom era and into the Meiji period. They are located in the Mekaru neighborhood of the city of Naha in Okinawa Prefecture, Japan. The tomb cluster was collectively designated a National Historic Site in 2007.

== Overview ==
The Mekaru Tomb Cluster is located approximately three kilometers west of the ruins of Shuri Castle. Approximately 1.5 kilometers to the west, the area overlooks the East China Sea. The surrounding area is made of Ryūkyū limestone, and the tombs are located in a valley alongside a small river flowing northwestward through gently undulating terrain. The 330 tombs are of various styles, dating from around the 15th century to the 20th century, and include the Izenadunchi Tomb , the largest of the Chinese-style turtleback tombs. After the war, this 214-hectare area was used as a U.S. military housing facility, but in 1987, the entire area was opened up for land readjustment. The Naha City Board of Education intermittently excavated and surveyed the others from 1990 to 2003. As the survey progressed, it became clear that many of the more than 330 tombs of various styles, dated back to the 14th and 15th centuries. Of these, the area north of the Mekaru River is the oldest, allowing for clear depictions of the deceased, and It was decided to preserve 29 of these tombs in their current state.

The Izenadunchi Tomb (伊是名殿内の墓) is the burial site of the Izena family, who were the lords of Izena and Iheya Islands. Located near the confluence of the Mekari and Owan Rivers, it measures approximately 30 meters north-to-south and 22 meters east-to-west. The tomb was carved into three sides of a small hill, and the excavated soil was used to develop the site. The tomb chamber has an arched ceiling, and three shelves at the front for placing the urns, with side shelves on both sides. At the front of the chamber the floor stones can be removed to allow temporary burial, to allow for decomposition before the bones are washed and placed in urns. The entrance to the tomb is currently blocked off with concrete blocks. The sleeve stones on either side of the facade of the tomb chamber, like those at Ginowan Palace, each have three tiers, signifying the tomb's high status. Regarding the date of the tomb's construction, it is believed to date to the late 19th century, when the Izena family rose to prominence, although stylistically it contains elements from the 18th century.

Located approximately 100 meters east of the Izenadouchi tomb, the preservation area includes two enclosed rock-shade tombs, with chambers created by stacking stones in front of the cliff face's rock shelter; 26 excavated tombs, with chambers created by digging horizontal tunnels into the clay layer beneath the Ryūkyū limestone; and one turtleback tomb. All of these were basically bone-washing burials, in which the remains were first placed in the burial chamber and allowed to decompose, then cleaned and reburied. Thirty-six exposed human remains were excavated from the enclosed rock-shade tomb, contemporaneous with the Hiyajoke ruins, a gusuku-era settlement located above the valley, suggesting a connection between the two. Many of the tombs contain ossuaries, and it is noteworthy that many of these have ink-written inscriptions on them, including the deceased's name, position, and dates of death and bone washing, compared to other areas. These inscriptions confirm that the tombs primarily belonged to the samurai class of the Ryūkyū Kingdom.

== See also ==
- List of Historic Sites of Japan (Okinawa)
