= Water supply in Miyakojima =

The water supply in Miyakojima involves the history and development of the current water supply on Miyakojima, a small coral island with only one river, which is administered by Okinawa Prefecture of southwestern Japan.

== Overview ==
The water supply in Miyakojima depends predominantly on spring water or ground water, since there are almost no rivers. Although the yearly rainfall amounts to 2,250 millimetres (89 in), 40% of it evaporates, 10% flows into the ground and 50% penetrates deep into the ground. Thus, there is almost no source of surface water.

== Geology ==
Beneath the soil of Miyakojima is a Ryukyu limestone layer which is porous, highly permeable, and does not preserve rainwater. Under the limestone layer is a Shimajiri mudstone layer of bedrock, which is an impermeable rock. In the local dialect, it is called kucha. Tectonic movements accompanied by several faults have formed underground valleys, and groundwater flows along these valleys. The underground basins are divided into 22 valleys.

Thus, 40 per cent of the abundant rainfall on Miyakojima penetrates the surface and quickly flows underground out into the ocean, unused. In addition, the strong subtropical sunshine evaporates as much as 50 per cent of the rainfall. The result is that only 10 per cent of the precipitation flows along the surface. Using natural water resources on Miyakojima has been quite difficult, owing to these natural conditions.

== List of ground water basins ==
A list of underground water basins
Mark	Name	Mark	Name	Mark	Name	Mark	Name
N0	Nishihenna	H0	Nishi-soedō	G1	Sunagawa	T1	Masubari
N1	Nishihara-tōbu	H1	Hirara	G2	Nakabari	T2	Yamagawa-kaigan
S1	Shirakawada (Susakadā)	H2	Hisamatsu	G3	Fukuzato	T3	Higa-tōbu
S2	Higashi-soedō	H3	Kawamitsu	G4	Minafuku	T4	Aragusuku-hokubu
		H4	Yonaha	G5	Bora		
		H5	Kadekari	G6	Bora-higashi		
		H6	Ueno	G7	Higashi-henna		

== List of water supply sources ==
A list of water supply sources
Name	Classification	Year of development	Capacity（m3/day）	Plant	Underground water basin
Shirakawada (Susakadā)	Spring	1953	11,250	Sodeyama	Susakadā
Yamagawa	Spring	1968	8,000	Sodeyama	Susakadā
Sodeyama	Underground water	1972	2,500	Sodeyama	Higashi-soedō
Maefuku	Underground water	1977	2,000	Sodeyama	Higashi-soedō
Nishi-sokohara	Underground water	1981	2,500	Sodeyama	Higashi-soedō
Takano	Underground water	1984	2,000	Sodeyama	Susakadā
Ōno	Underground water	1993	3,000	Sodeyama	Susakadā
Nyātsu	Underground water	1994	3,000	Sodeyama	Hirara
Sokohara	Underground water	1994	2,000	Sodeyama	Higashi-soedō
Kajidō	Underground water	1965	3,200	Kajidō	Fukuzato
Kajidō-nishi	Underground water	1995	1,000	Kajidō	Fukuzato
Miyaboshi	Underground water	planned	1,650		
Nishi-soedō	Underground water	preparatory	2,000		
Aragusuku	Underground water	preparatory	1,500		

== History ==
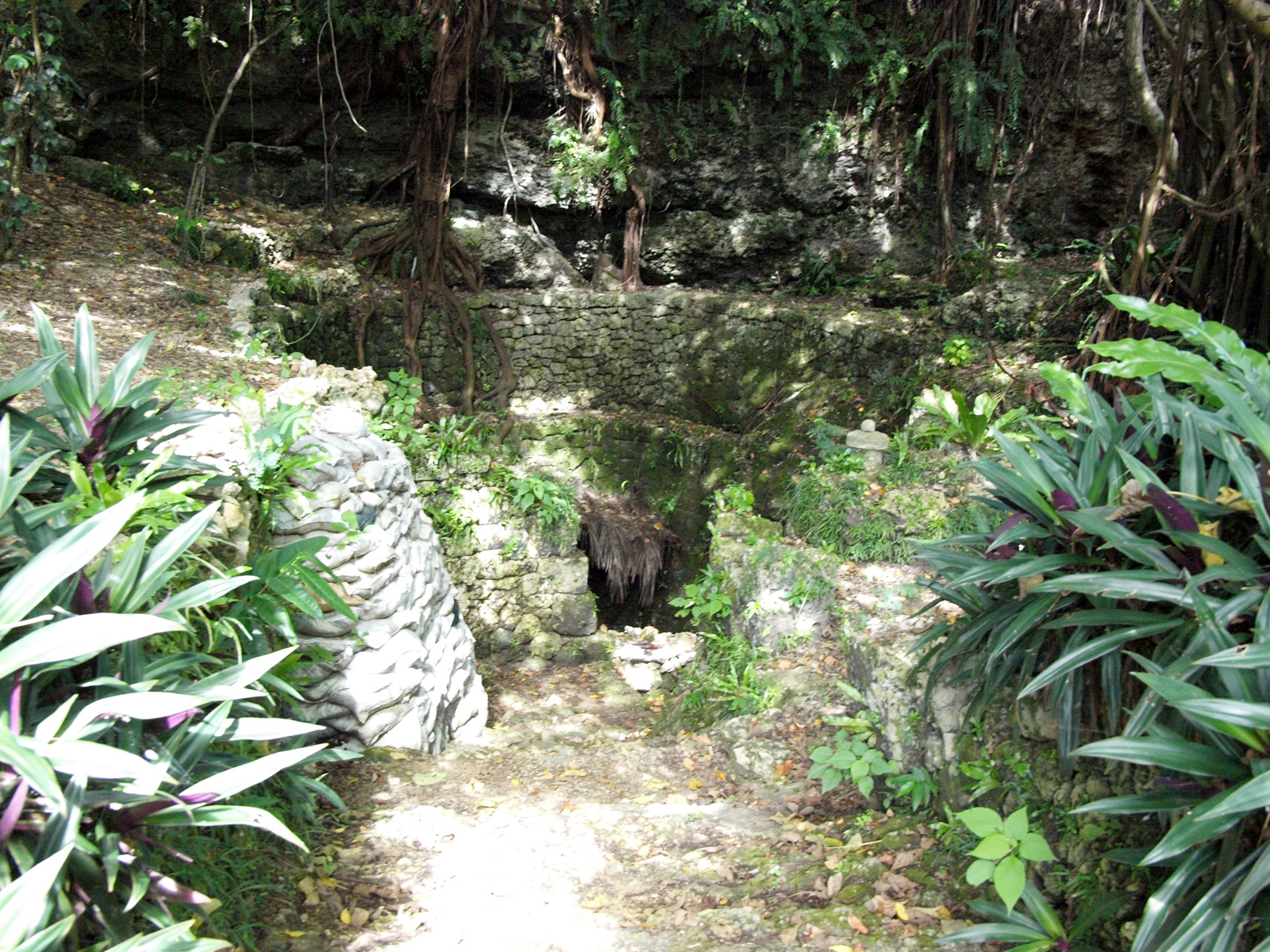
Entrance to Yamatu-gā

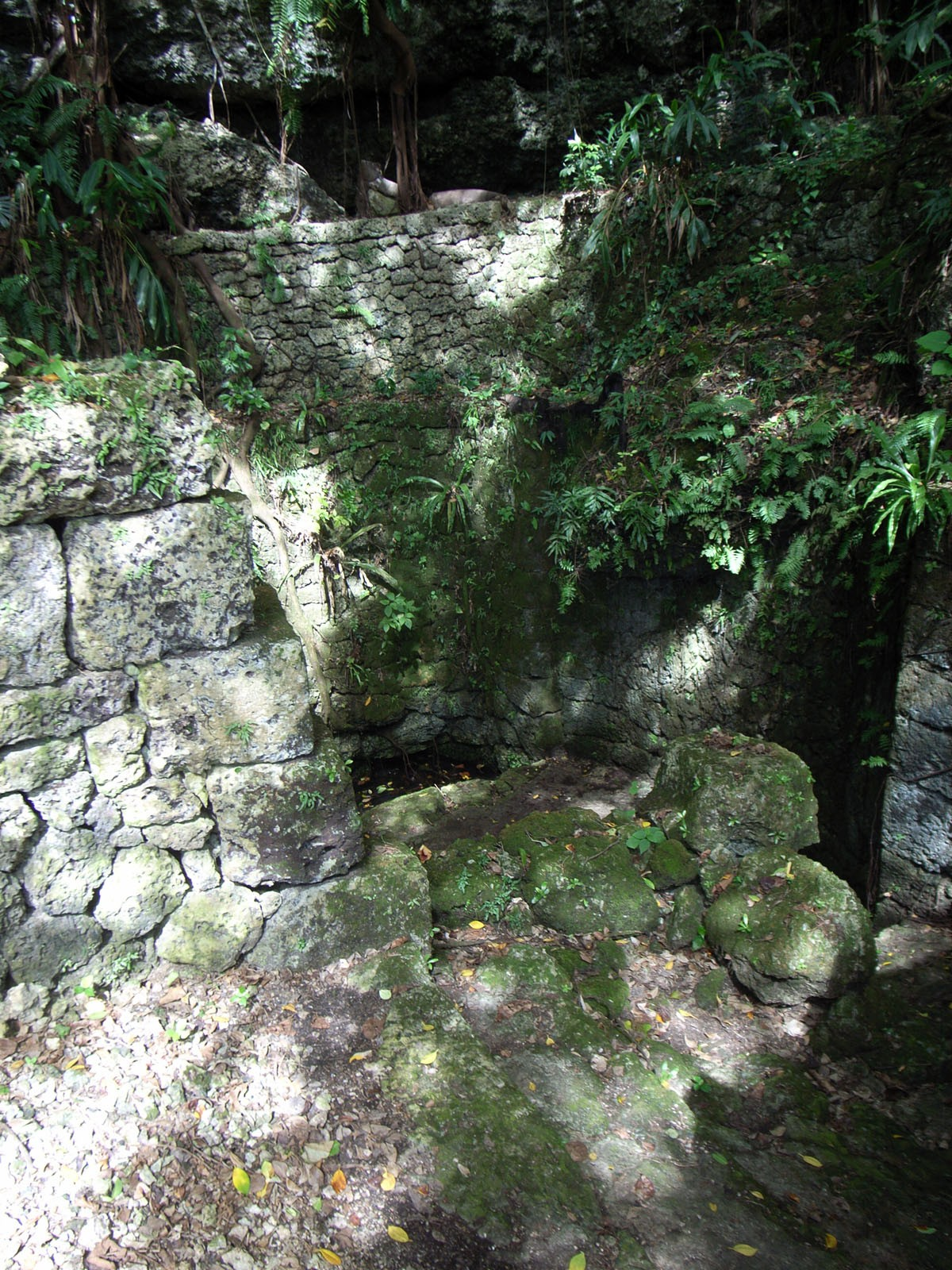
Yamatu-gā

In the past, water in deep caves was used, as suggested by their language. Namely, the spring is called urigā, which means "going down into the cave and drawing water from the spring".

It was usually several meters deep into the ground, in some cases, 20 meters by stepping down the stone steps. In the 13th century, excavation of wells started and in an early 18th-century document, 59 wells were recorded. Among them, Yamatsugā which was developed in 1720, was designated as an important site by the Hirara City (now Miyakojima City) education committee. It was a rich spring, and was used only by the government officials at the time. There was a guard posted at the spring. It was the duty of women to go down to the caves and draw water, and since the Meiji era, girls went down to the caves and drew water, as adult women had other duties. Due to the increase in population, it became a business to sell water from neighboring places.

Collecting rainwater in large vases and tanks started in the Taishō era (1912–1925). The first water supply by manpower was made in 1924. Men walked inside a treadmill 5 meters in diameter, which drew up a chain of water vases continuously from a well, 23 meters deep. The inventor was Chōgi Itosu, who sold the obtained water. A modern water supply plan was proposed in 1934 in Hirara, but in vain. In 1943, the Japanese Navy completed the first water supply from the Susakadā Well, and after 1945, US forces improved and used it.

In March 1951, a formal construction plan for a water supply from Susakadā to Sodeyama was made and the construction started on March 27, 1952. Many citizens participated in the construction with pleasure. Service started on May 4, 1953. In 1954, the construction of water supply started in Gusukube town and by 1977, water supply service covered the entire Miyakojima.

In May 1964, the US government established the Miyakojima water supply agency, but it was abolished by the inhabitants. On July 1, 1965, a Miyakojima water supply and sewage organization was established Due to the increase in the demand of water, investigations on the situation of ground water were started in 1962. On July 15, 1965, Miyakojima ground water control regulations were determined; which were renewed on May 23, 1987. In 1973, there was a considerable drought in Miyakojima; leading to the investigation for new water sources. Projects for an underground dam and the conversion of Yonaha Bay into a fresh water lake were considered. The Yonaha Bay project met an opposition campaign in 1981 and was cancelled in 1983. The underground dam project continued and the Fukuzato underground dam and Sunakawa underground dam were completed in 1998. In 1993, rainfall dropped to two-thirds of the annual mean. Water restrictions continued from January 21 to April 1.

== Present water sources ==
There are springs in the caves such as Yamatu-gā, Susakadā, Bisa-gā, Bora-gā and Kubaka-gā. There is only one river flowing on the surface, Sakida-gā, only 3 kilometres (1.9 mi) long. The largest spring, called Susakadā, covered all areas of Miyakojima; but after the drought of 1971, the water source of Sodeyama was developed. After the drought of 1993, water sources of Ōno, Nyātsu, Sokohara were developed. There are Sodeyama Purification Plant and Kajidō Purification Plant, and service reservoirs are at Hisamatsu, Shijō, Karimata and Bora. Two underground reservoirs were completed in 1989 in Susakadā, both 40,000 cubic meters. The water in Miyakojima is hard water, which is unsatisfactory both in taste and in the handling of metallic tableware. In 1999, adjustments to the pH were started at Sodeyama with water softening using lime softening in a pellet-reactor. Strict surveillance of the quality of the water supply is being done to prevent contamination through infiltration by fertilizers and other sources of local drainage.
