= Kinjo Dam =

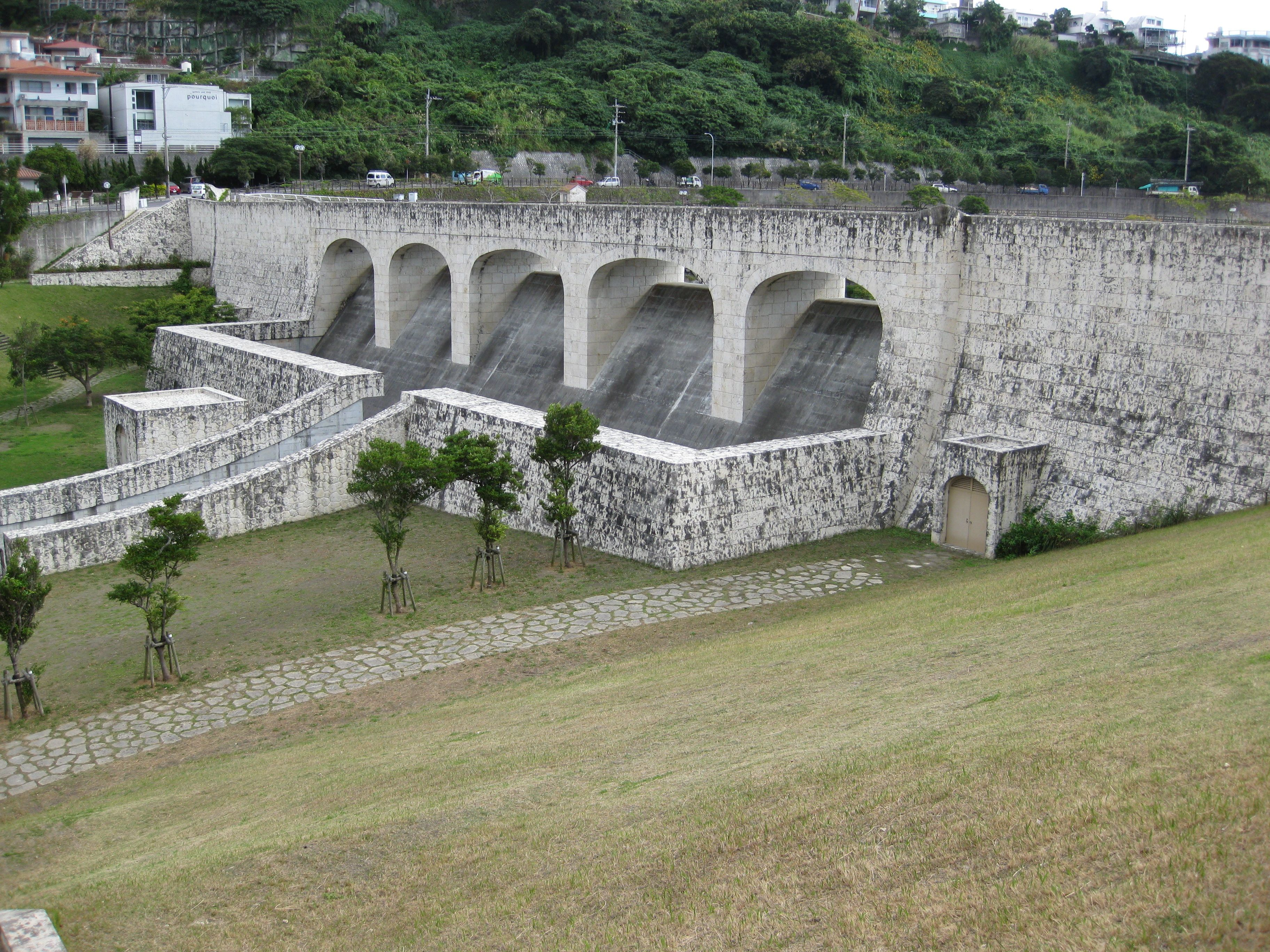
- Interactive map of Kinjo Dam
- Country: Japan
- Location: Naha, Okinawa
- Coordinates: 26°12′44″N 127°43′03″E
- Status: Operational
- Construction began: 1989
- Opening date: 2000

Dam and spillways
- Type of dam: Concrete gravity
- Height: 19 m (62 ft)
- Length: 120 m (394 ft)
- Elevation at crest: 52 m (171 ft)
- Dam volume: 14,250 m^{3} (18,638 cu yd)
- Spillways: 5-openings
- Spillway type: Service, uncontrolled overflow

Reservoir
- Total capacity: 510,000 m^{3} (413 acre⋅ft)
- Active capacity: 470,000 m^{3} (381 acre⋅ft)
- Catchment area: 1.7 km^{2} (1 sq mi)
- Surface area: 400 m^{2} (4,306 ft^{2})

The Kinjo Dam (金城ダム, Kinjō Damu) is a concrete gravity dam on the Li River in Naha, Okinawa Prefecture, Japan. It is designated as a cultural property and is located 500 m (1,640 ft) south of Shuri Castle. Construction on the dam began in 1989 and it was completed in 2000. Its main purpose is flood control and on average, it can control an intake of 40 m^{3}/s (1,413 cu ft/s); releasing 23 m^{3}/s (812 cu ft/s). The 19 m (62 ft) tall and 120 m (394 ft) long dam was constructed on fragile rock and is set on a deep concrete staircase foundation.
