= Hanta Road =

Road in Okinawa Prefecture, Japan

- ハンタ道; Hanta-michi (Okinawan)
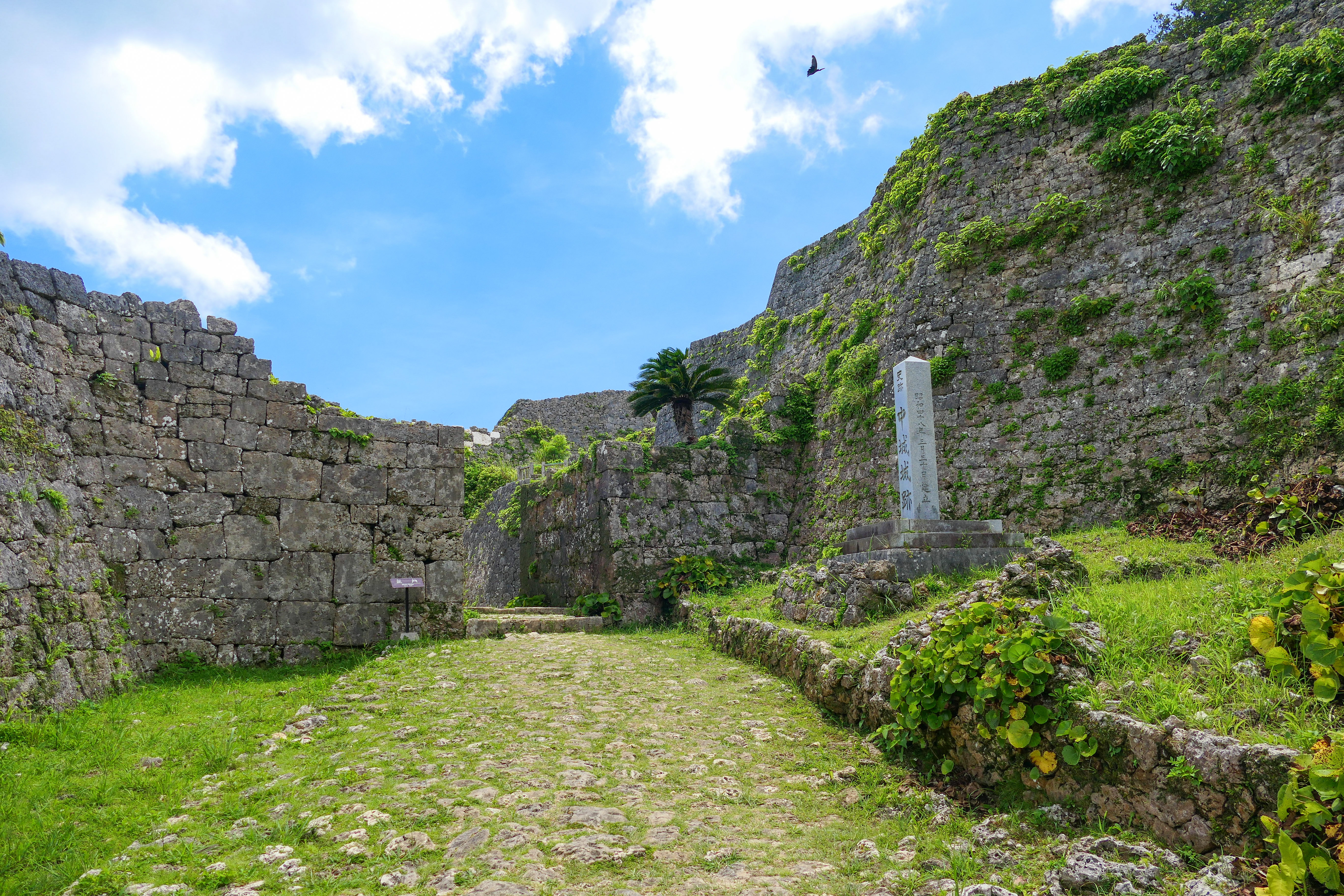
- Entrance to Nakagusuku Castle with fragment of Hanta Road

- Location within Okinawa Prefecture Location within Japan
- Type: Road remnants
- Location: Naha to Nakagusuku, Okinawa, Japan

History
- Built: early 14th century
- National Historic Site of Japan Gusuku (castles) along the Hanta Road

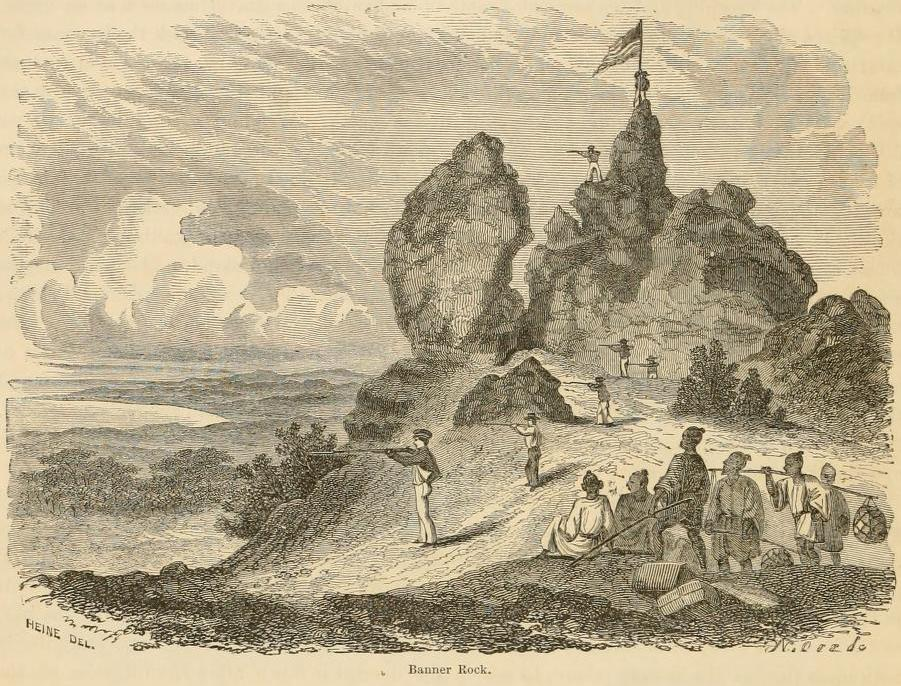
1856 engraving of Perry's Banner Rock, showing the Hanta Road in the foreground

The Hanta Road (ハンタ道; Okinawan: Hanta-michi) is a historical road in the southern part of Okinawa Island, Japan. During the Gusuku period (14th to 17th century), it served as the major route for travel between Shuri Castle, the royal court of the Ryukyu Kingdom, and the gusuku (castles) of Nakagusuku and Katsuren.

== History ==
The Hanta Road served as a transportation artery from Shuri via Nakagusuku to Katsuren. The road passes along the edge of a hill on the eastern side of Okinawa Island at an elevation of 100–160 meters, overlooking the Pacific Ocean for most of the way. Hanta (ハンタ) is Okinawan for "cliff", referring to the route's proximity to the seashore.

While the exact date of construction is unclear, the road is believed to have been created in the early part of the 14th century, when the main part of Nakagusuku Castle was built. From the 15th century, the gusuku castles along the road were often contested, and during the reign of King Shō Taikyū and the Gosamaru-Amawari Rebellion of 1458, when the aji of Shuri, Nakagusuku and Katsuren fought for control, armies traveled along it. Shō Taikyū's eventual victory over both Gosamaru and Amawari led to the destruction of Katsuren Castle and gave the Ryūkyū Kingdom firm control of the entire road.

Furthermore, during the Second Shō Dynasty from the late 15th century onward, as part of the development of a road network centered on Shuri for the transmission of royal orders and supplies, the road became part of the Nakagami-hō Tōkaidō (中頭方東海道; lit. 'Nakagami-side East Sea Route') post road, with the name indicating a function similar to the Tōkaidō road in mainland Japan, connecting the various magistrates. However, with the establishment of Ginowan Magiri in 1671, the Nakagashira Tōkaidō Road began passing through the newly established Ginowan Magiri from Nishihara Magiri, and the Nakagusuku Hanta Road ceased to function as a post road. Thereafter, it was used as a daily route connecting local settlements and magistrates.

In 1853, the Perry Expedition sent an expedition to survey Okinawa Island, with surveyors traveling north from Shuri through Nakagusuku Magiri using the Hanta Road. Along the road a short distance from Arakaki settlement, there is a roughly 15-meter-tall Ryukyu limestone boulder known as Perry's Banner Rock (ペリーの旗立岩; Okinawan: ターチャーイシ, romanized: Taachaa ishi), where the expedition rested and planted the United States flag.

== Current status ==
Approximately 330 meters of road remain in good condition in the Arakaki (新垣) district. Archaeological excavations have uncovered stone paving from two periods: the 15th century and early modern times. The early modern road is 1.8 to 2.4 meters wide, with irregular smaller stones laid on the road surface and larger stones used for the curb. Along the road are the remains of a settlement (Arakaki Uehara Ruins) dating from the 14th century to the modern era, the settlement's well, Meejaga, and the remains of Arakaki Castle, believed to have served as a settlement defense and dated from the 14th to early 16th centuries.

The gusuku of Shuri, Nakagusuku and Katsuren form part of the UNESCO World Heritage Site Gusuku Sites and Related Properties of the Kingdom of Ryukyu. A 6.2 kilometer portion of the route near Nakagusuku has been paved and opened to the public as the Nakagusuku Hanta Michi (中城ハンタ道) walking trail. In 2015, the area was designated a National Historic Site.

== See also ==
- List of Historic Sites of Japan (Okinawa)
