= Sonohyan-utaki =

Sacred grove at Shuri Castle, Okinawa

Coordinates: 26.218075°N 127.717352°E

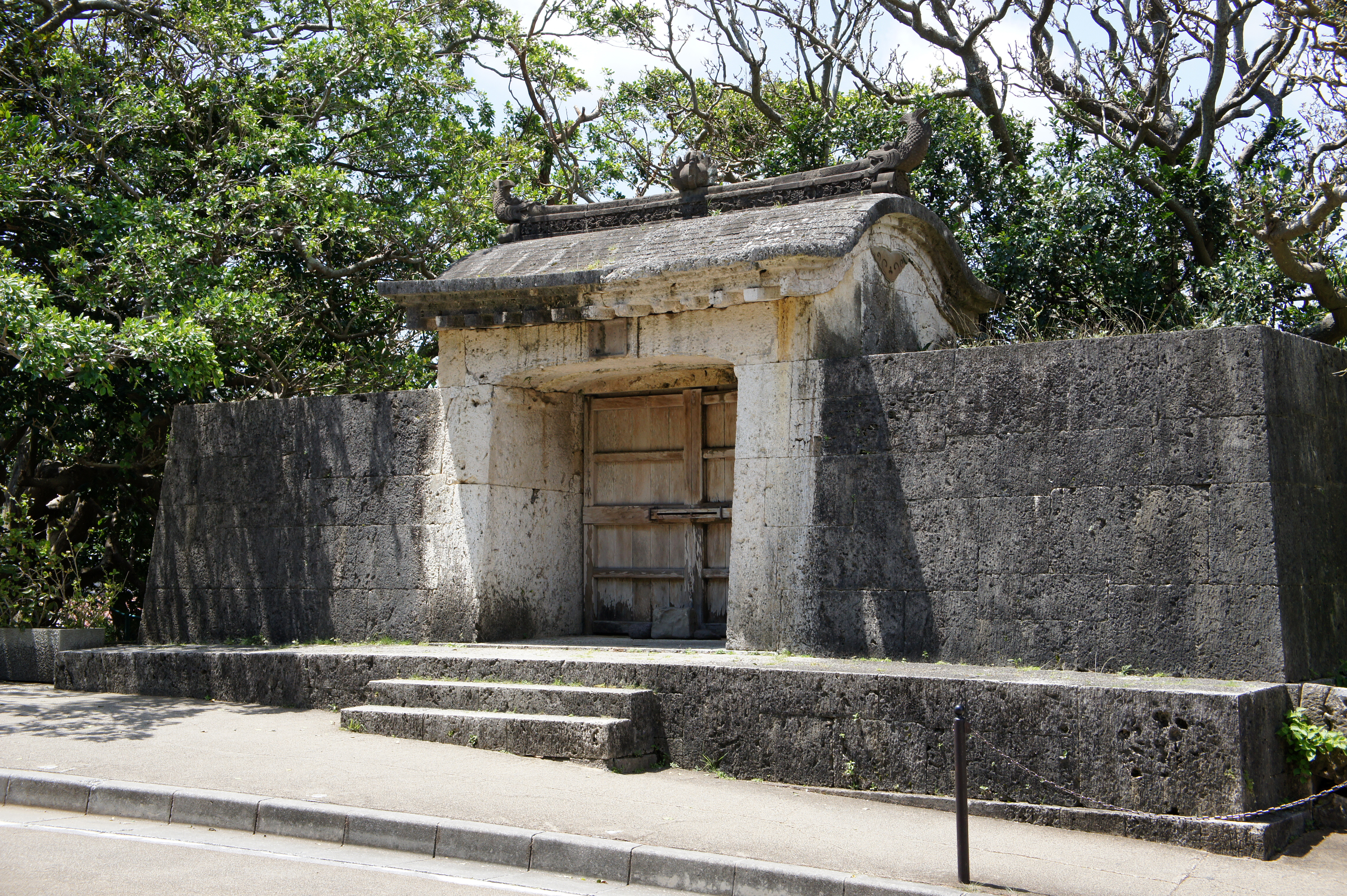
The stone gates of Sonohyan-utaki.

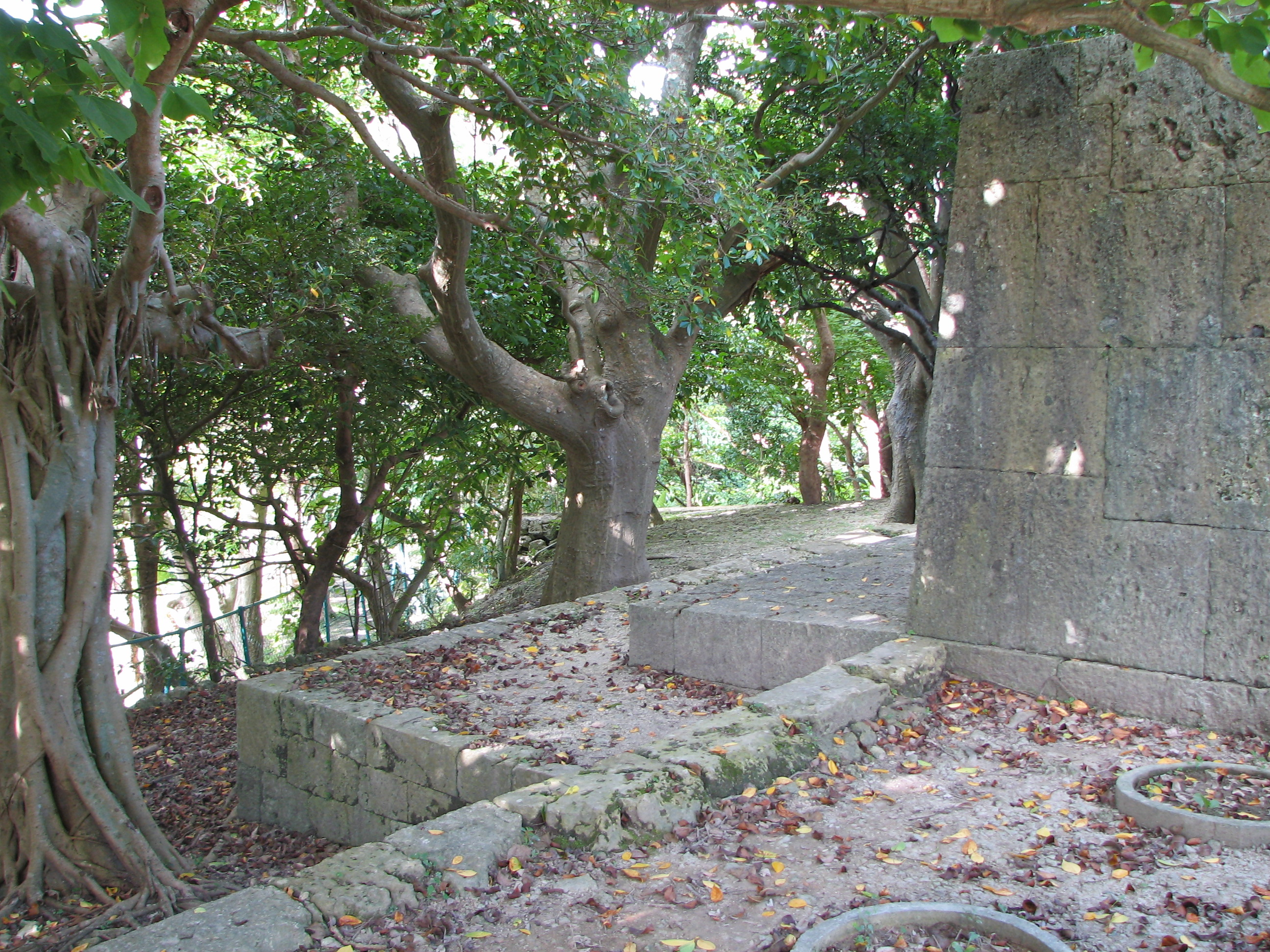
The Grove of Sonohyan-utaki

Sonohyan-utaki (園比屋武御嶽; Okinawan: スヌファンウタキ Sunufan-utaki) is a sacred grove of trees and plants (utaki) of the traditional indigenous Ryukyuan religion. It is located on the grounds of Shuri Castle in Naha, Okinawa, a few paces away from the Shureimon castle gate. The utaki, or more specifically its stone gate (Okinawan: イシジョー/石門, romanized: ishi-jō), is one of a number of sites which together comprise the UNESCO World Heritage Site officially described as Gusuku Sites and Related Properties of the Kingdom of Ryukyu, and has been designated an Important Cultural Property by the Japanese national government.

While the gates were once opened only for the king, today they are always closed, and so the gates have in a way become a sacred space themselves, representative of the actual sacred space behind them. Many travellers and locals come to pray at the gates.

The stone gate was first built in 1519, during the reign of Ryukyuan king Shō Shin, though the space had been recognized as a sacred utaki prior to that. Whenever the king left the castle on a journey, he would first stop at Sonohyan-utaki to pray for safe travels. The site also played an important role in the initiation of the high priestess Kikoe-ōgimi (Okinawan: チフィジン/聞得大君, romanized: chifijin) of the native religion.

The gate is said to be a prime example of traditional Ryukyuan architecture, and shows many signs of Chinese influence, along with a Japanese-influenced gable in the karahafu style. It was severely damaged in the 1945 battle of Okinawa, but was restored in 1957, and officially designated a UNESCO World Heritage Site in 2000, along with a number of other sites across Okinawa Island. The utaki, i.e. the sacred grove itself, was once much larger than it is today, an elementary school and other buildings having encroached upon the space.
