= Momoto-fumiagari =

Momoto-fumiagari 百度踏揚
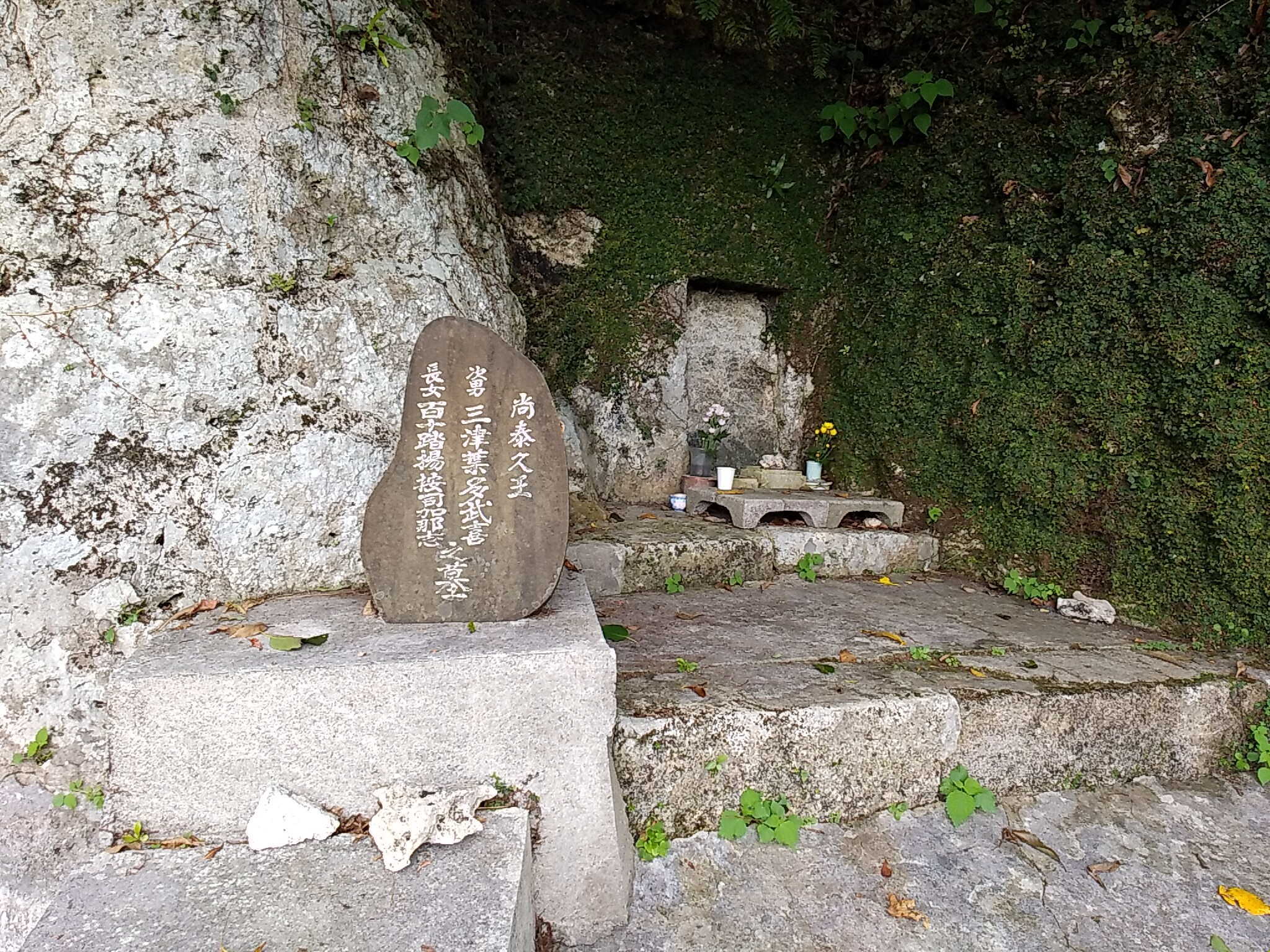
- Tomb of Mitsubatabuki and Momoto-fumiagari

Princess of Ryūkyū
- Born: Unknown
- Died: Unknown; Nakaema
- Burial: Tomb of Mitsubatabuki and Momoto-fumiagari (Nanjō, Okinawa
- Spouses: Amawari (Katsuren Aji); Uni-ufugushiku (Goeku Aji)
- Issue: Ka Shōki ♂ ?
- Warabinā: ?
- Divine name: Momoto-fumiagari
- Title: Fumiagari Aji
- House: Shō
- Dynasty: First Shō dynasty
- Father: Shō Taikyū (King of Ryūkyū)
- Mother: Daughter of Gosamaru (Queen of Ryūkyū)

Momoto-fumiagari (百度踏揚 or 百十踏揚) (dates of birth and death unknown, 15th century) was a princess of the first Shō dynasty of the Ryūkyū Kingdom.

== Name and tradition ==
"Momoto-fumiagari" was not her personal name, which is unknown, but her divine name as a high-ranking priestess. It means "high spirit for all eternity". The divine name of "Momoto-fumiagari" has not been used by any priestess since her death.

The historical sources (all compiled several centuries after her death) call her Momoto-fumi-akari (もゝと・ふみ・あかり) or Royal Princess Fumiagari Aji (蹈揚按司乃王女 or 王女踏揚按司).

Nine poems of the Omorosaushi mention Momoto-fumiagari (volume 6, poems 335 to 343), but it is not possible to determine if they concern Shō Taikyū's daughter or some older priestesses of the same name. Momoto-fumiagari's prayers and dances are presented as the cause of the royal power.

== Early life and family relations ==
Momoto-fumiagari was the eldest daughter of Shō Taikyū, who was the sixth king of the first Shō dynasty, and of his queen, the daughter of Gosamaru (Aji of Yuntanza and then Nakagusuku). She also descended from the kings of Hokuzan through her mother and paternal grandmother.

As the eldest daughter of the king, she took part in the religious ceremonies that protected the royal family and the kingdom. The sources mentioning her emphasize that she danced and sang religious songs.

- father: Shō Taikyū (尚 泰久)
- mother: Daughter of Gosamaru (護佐丸女)
- older brother: Ashitomi-kanahashi or Ashitū-kanahashi (安次富金橋 or 安次富加那巴志) (ancestor of the Ashitomi household)
- younger brother: Mitsubatabuki (三津葉多武喜) (ancestor of the Nakaema household)
- youngest brother: Hachiman-ganashi (八幡加那志) (ancestor of the Shū clan)
- first spouse: Amawari (阿麻和利) (Katsuren Aji)
- second spouse: Uni-ufugushiku (鬼大城) (Goeku Aji)
- son (with Uni-ufugushiku): Ka Shōki (夏 承基)

== Biography ==
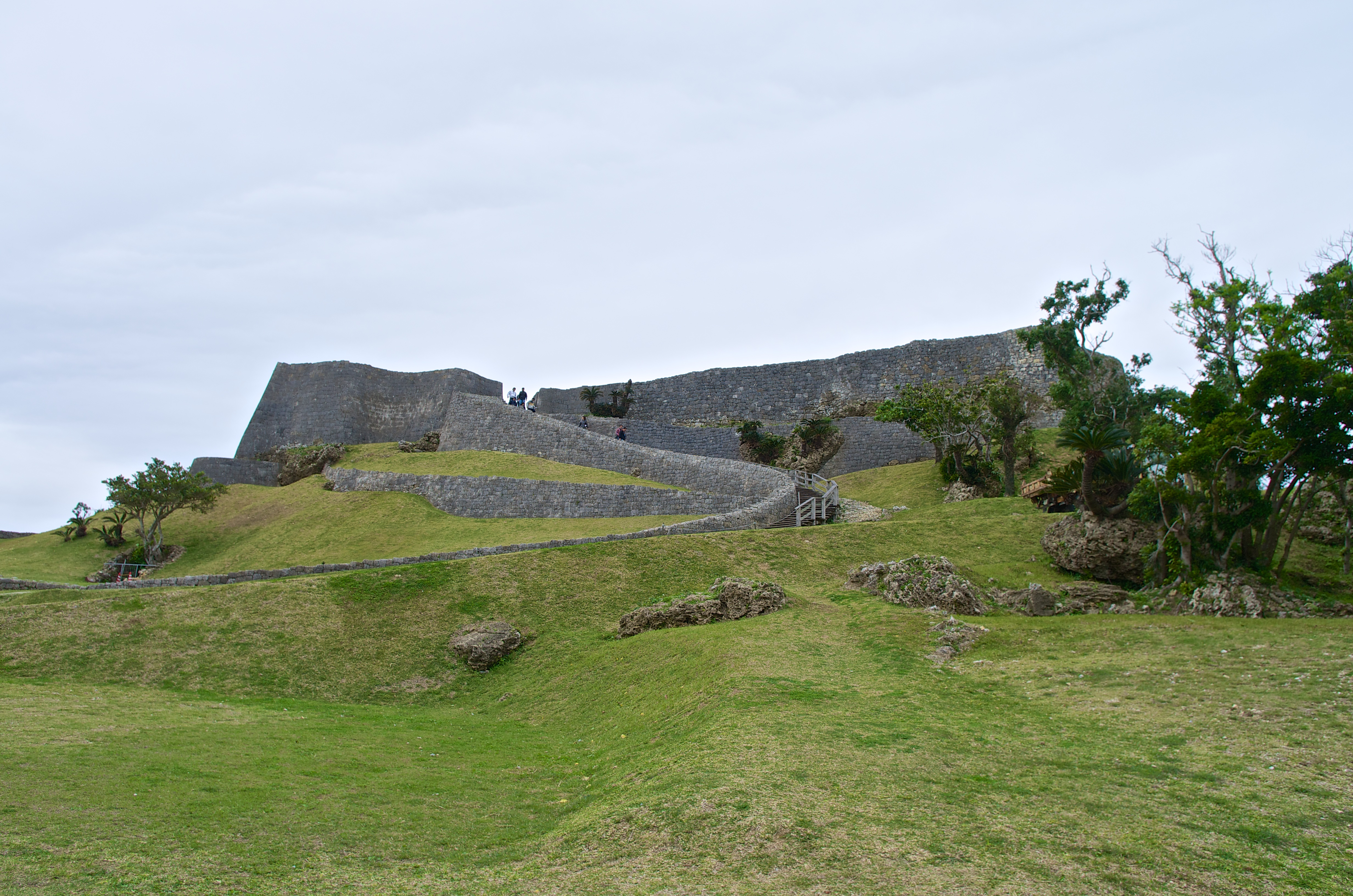
Katsuren Gusuku

Momoto-fumiagari first married Katsuren Aji, Amawari. He was a young man of peasant descent who rose to the rank of aji and controlled the gusuku of Katsuren. His power was such that the king married him to his daughter, likely in an attempt to control the increasingly powerful aji.

During the troubles between Amawari and Gosamaru in 1458, after Gosamaru's death, Momoto-fumiagari discovered Awamari's intention to march upon Shuri to overthrow Shō Taikyū. She ran from Katsuren Gusuku with Uni-ufugushiku, one of the king's loyal vassals, who carried her on his back to Shuri so she could warn her father of the danger that her husband represented.

According to tradition, upon arriving at Waniyama (和仁屋間) Beach (Nakagusuku, Okinawa), they spotted a large number of torches coming their way from Katsuren, showing that Amawari had already sent an army to prevent Momoto-fumiagari from warning her father. Momoto-fumiagari sang a sacred song, and a strong rain put the torches out, causing confusion among the pursuers. (Note: The genealogical records of the Ka Clan mention poem 342 of the Omorosaushi, in which Momoto-fumiagari provokes a storm, as referring to this story.)

When they finally arrived at Shuri, the king, scandalised that his daughter was wandering at night with a man who is not her husband, first refused to let her in. He only had the doors opened when she threatened to hang herself on one of the trees of the Akatauchiyau-nu-utaki sacred site. After telling the king about her husband's intentions, Momoto-fumiagari began singing several sacred songs in order to protect the kingdom. (Note: The genealogical records of the Ka Clan mention poem 343 of the Omorosaushi, as referring to this story, as it describes the king as very proud of his daughter.)

Shō Taikyū then gave the command of Shuri's armies to Uni-ufugushiku, who defeated Amawari.

After the battle, Momoto-fumiagari married Uni-ufugushiku, to whom the king gave the magiri of Goeku.

In 1469, after Shō En's coup d'état that overthrows the first Shō dynasty and starts the second one, Momoto-fumiagari's husband, loyal to the former king Shō Toku, fell into disgrace and was assassinated after retreating into a cave on the slopes of Chibana Castle.

Most of Momoto-fumiagari's brothers left Shuri, probably in 1461 when Shō Toku had been crowned, or before in relation with the conflict involving Gosamaru. They had been ousted from the throne probably because they were the children of Gosamaru's daughter. They had control over lands in the southern part of Okinawa Island.

Momoto-fumiagari took refuge with her younger brother Mitsubatabuki in Ōkawa Castle (Tamagusuku, Nanjō) and is said to have dedicated the rest of her life to religious activities, living in a residence at the location of the current Nakaema Residence in Nakaema (Nanjō).

Although official sources do not mention it, local traditions say that the resistance to Shō En's coup d'état and to the creation of the second Shō dynasty was organised around Nakaema Castle, then held by the fourth son of Shō Taikyū and Gosamaru's daughter, Hachiman-ganashi. The castle's destruction would have occurred under the reign of Shō Shin, third king of the second Shō dynasty, implying that conflicts persisted for some time and that the end of Momoto-fumiagari's life was probably marked by numerous battles as well.

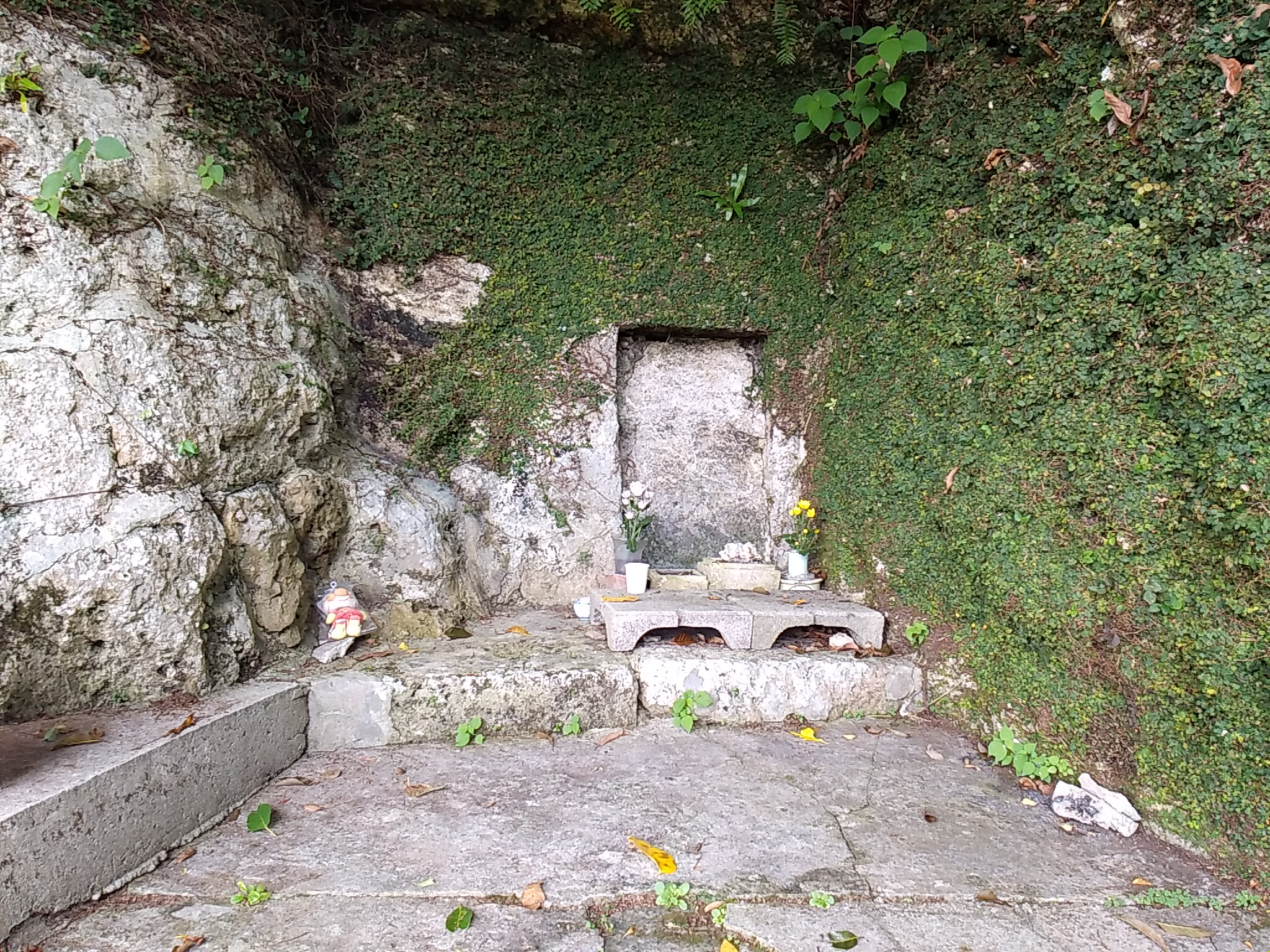
Tomb of Mitsubatabuki and Momoto-fumiagari

Momoto-fumiagari's tomb was originally located in a limestone cliff in the Irihichimui (西ヒチ森) sacred forest (Fusato, Tamagusuku), but it was destroyed in 1962 during the construction of Tamagusuku Middle School. Afterwards, the tomb was moved to the cliff east of the school's sports ground, next to the collective tomb for Mitsubatabuki's descendants.

A golden hairpin and a bronze mirror said to have belonged to Momoto-fumiagari are kept by the clan of Mitsubatabuki's descendants.

Although the official sources do not mention any offspring, the Ka (夏) Clan claims Momoto-fumiagari's second spouse Uni-ufugushiku as their ancestor and their genealogical records mention Momoto-fumiagari. Only the eldest son of Uni-ufugushiku, Ka Shōki (夏 承基)., is mentioned.

== In popular culture ==
- Momoto-fumiagari is one of the main characters in the modern kumiodori play the brave Amawari (肝高の阿麻和利, Chimudaka no Amawari).
- Momoto-fumiagari was played by Rino Higa in the television series Amawari the last hero broadcast by the channel RBC in 2024.
