= Nakagusuku =

Nakagusuku (Japanese: 中城) may refer to:

- Nakagusuku, Okinawa, a village located in Okinawa Prefecture, Japan
- Nakagusuku Castle, a gusuku in Okinawa, Japan
- Nakagusuku Bay, a bay on the southern coast of Okinawa Island on the Pacific Ocean in Japan
- Nakagusuku Hotel ruins, an abandoned hotel in Kitanakagusuku, Okinawa

== See also ==
- Kitanakagusuku, a village in Okinawa Prefecture, Japan
