= Chibana Castle =

Gusuku in Okinawa, Japan

Chibana Castle 知花城
- Okinawa, Okinawa
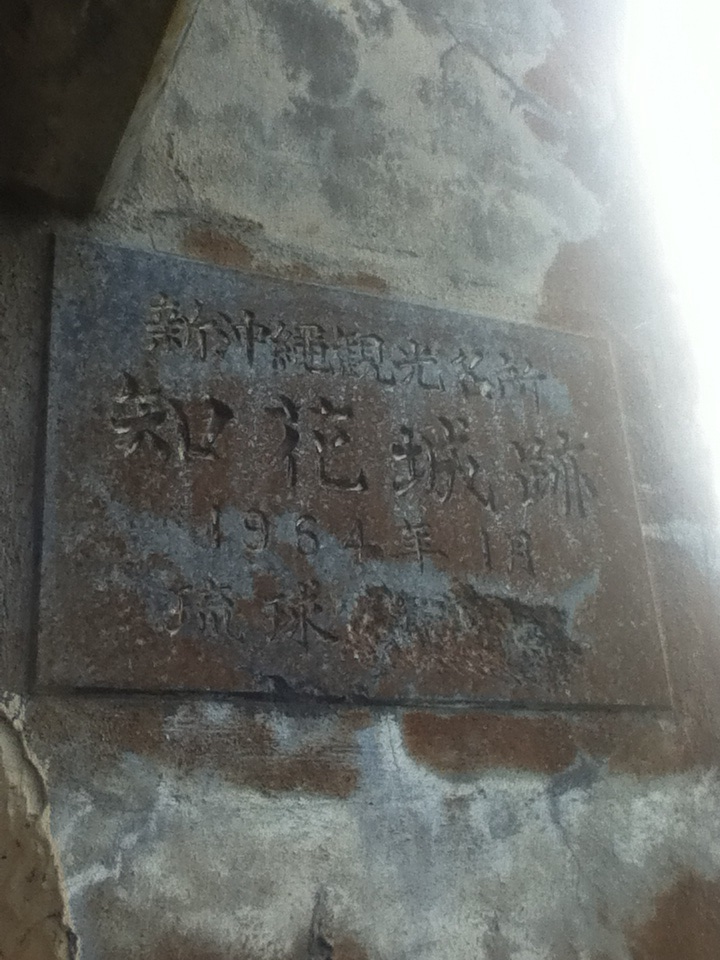
- Plaque on observation structure commemorating Chibana Castle

Site information
- Type: Gusuku
- Controlled by: Ryūkyū Kingdom (15th century–1879); Empire of Japan (1879–1945); United States Military Government of the Ryukyu Islands (1945-1950); United States Civil Administration of the Ryukyu Islands (1950-1972); Japan (1972-present)
- Open to the public: yes
- Condition: Ruins

Location
- Coordinates: 26°21′47″N 127°48′39″E

Site history
- Built: 14th century
- Built by: Aji of Goeku Magiri
- In use: 14th century–15th century
- Materials: Ryukyuan limestone, wood

Garrison information
- Occupants: Aji of Goeku Magiri, Uni-Ufugusuku

Chibana Castle (知花城, Chibana jō; Okinawan: Chibana gushiku), also known as Goeku Castle (越来城, Goeku jō; Okinawan: Gwiiku gushiku) was a Ryukyuan gusuku on Okinawa Island. In the Chibana district of Okinawa City, the castle site sits on a hill and is surrounded by jungle.

== History ==
Chibana Castle was in use during the reign of the First Shō Dynasty and served as the residence of the Aji of Goeku Magiri. The castle and Goeku Magiri was given to the Ryukyuan general Uni-Ufugusuku by King Shō Taikyū in return for defeating the Aji of Katsuren Castle, Amawari. After the fall of the First Shō Dynasty, Uni-Ufugusuku was expelled from the castle and later committed suicide. His tomb, and that of his wife, was built at the bottom of the hill that Chibana Castle is atop.

In the early 1960s, a structure was built on top of the hill to commemorate the castle and serve as a tourist attraction, from which all of the former Goeku Magiri can be seen.

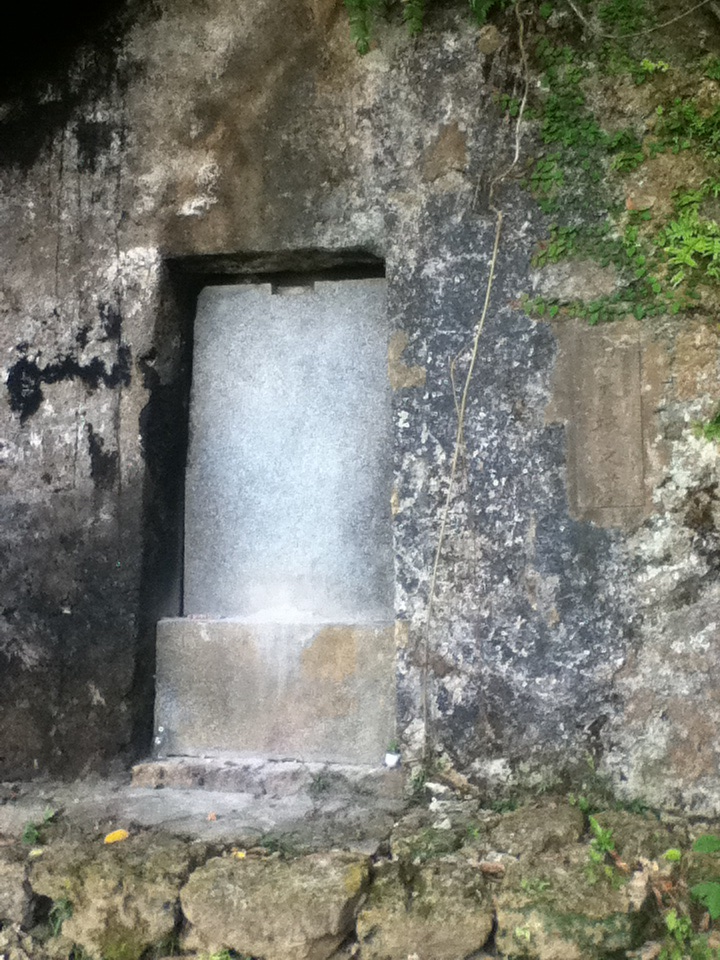
Tomb of Uni-Ufugusuku.
