= Shō Taikyū =

King of the Ryukyu Kingdom

Shō Taikyū 尚泰久
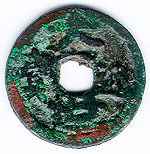
- Taisei Tsūhō cash coin, produced under Shō Taikyū

King of Ryukyu King of Chūzan
- Reign: 1454–1460
- Predecessor: Shō Kinpuku
- Successor: Shō Toku
- Born: 1410
- Died: 1460 (aged 49–50)
Posthumous name
- Oyō-no-Nushi 大世主
- Okinawan pronunciation: Shō Tēchū (尚泰久)
- Divine name: Nanoshiyomoi (那之志與茂伊)
- House: First Shō dynasty
- Father: Various described as Shō Kinpuku, Shō Hashi, or the lord of Goeku
- Religion: Zen Buddhism

Shō Taikyū (1410–1460) was a king of the first Shō dynasty of the Ryukyu Kingdom of the western Pacific island of Okinawa, reigning from 1454 to 1460. Although described in the official histories of Ryukyu and the Ming annals as a relative of the previous rulers, he may have been an unrelated ruler of the castle of Goeku, taking power amidst a succession crisis between two other lords which resulted in the destruction of Shuri Castle. He rebuilt the castle during his reign and saw the transformation of Shuri into the political and economic center of Okinawa. A sponsor of Zen Buddhism, he invited Japanese monks to settle in the kingdom and authorized the foundation of four Buddhist temples in his kingdom. He commissioned a number of large bronze bells, including the inscribed Bridge of Nations Bell which was displayed at Shuri. The kingdom's first domestic coinage was produced during his reign.

In 1458, a conflict broke out between Amawari, the aji (lord) of Katsuren, and Gosamaru, the aji of Nakagusuku. Given a dramatic legendary narrative in the official histories, the conflict allowed Taikyū to take control of the two gusuku (castles) and monopolize trade connections with Joseon. He died in 1460 with no recorded cause of death. His successor, Shō Toku, was officially recorded as his son, but may have been an unrelated leader (possibly a wakō pirate) who overthrew Taikyū. Toku later died and was succeeded by Kanemaru, a close ally of Taikyū.

== Biography ==
=== Family and enthronement ===
Shō Taikyū was born on Okinawa in 1410, likely near the castle of Goeku in the polity of Chūzan. The Chūzan Seikan (中山世鑑; Reflections on Chūzan), a 1650 official history of the Ryukyu Kingdom, describes Taikyū as the son of King Shō Kinpuku; however, Kinpuku's birth date is listed in the official histories as 1398, which would imply he fathered Taikyū at the unrealistically young age of eleven or twelve. The Ming Veritable Records (the contemporary Chinese imperial annals) and the Chūzan Seikan instead lists Taikyū as a "royal brother", the younger brother of Kinpuku and the seventh son of Shō Hashi, the unifier of the three kingdoms of Okinawa and second king of the First Shō dynasty. Prior to his rise to the kingship of Chūzan, the official histories refer to Taikyū as "Prince Goeku", an anachronistic title which developed in later periods. The 16th-century Omoro Sōshi (おもろさうし), a compilation of Okinawan songs and poems, describes him not as a blood relative of Hashi, but as the son of a ruler of Goeku.

Following Hashi's death in 1439, a rapid succession of rulers took the throne of Chūzan. These rulers are recorded in the official histories of the Ryukyu Kingdom as Hashi's sons and grandsons. Instead of a familial lineage, the dynasty may have been a succession of powerful military leaders. The throne passed through Shō Chū (r. 1439–1444), Shō Shitatsu (r. 1444–1449), and Shō Kinpuku (r. 1449–1453). After Kinpuku's death, the histories record a disputed succession between Kinpuku's son Shiro and Hashi's sixth son, Furi, which erupted into the Shiro–Furi Rebellion and the burning of Shuri Castle. A major fire at Shuri in 1453 is attested through archaeological evidence, although the specifics of the conflict are unknown. Both Shiro and Furi died in the struggle, and Taikyū took the throne by the following year. The historian Gregory Smits theorizes that Shiro and Furi's forces may have been weakened by their conflict, allowing Taikyū to enter the conflict later and seize the throne from his base in Goeku. Alternatively, he may have been a party in the conflict from its beginning. His ascendance is recorded in the Ming Veritable Records in February 1454, where an envoy names him the younger brother of Kinpuku and requests a new royal seal to replace one destroyed in the conflict between Shiro and Furi.

=== Reign ===
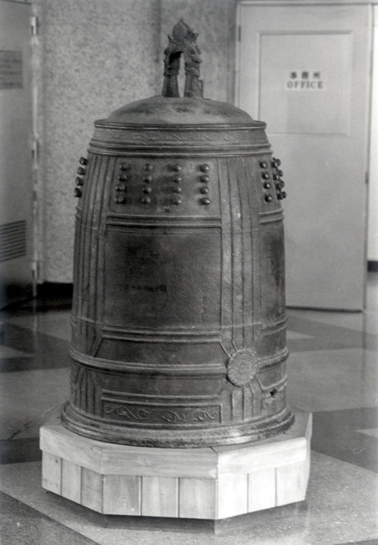
The Bridge of Nations Bell, commissioned by Taikyū

Taikyū oversaw the reconstruction of Shuri Castle, and it became the dominant political center on Okinawa during his reign. Ryang Seong, a Korean castaway who stayed at Shuri during Taikyū's reign, described the castle as containing three sets of walls, with a three-story tower at the center serving as the administrative center and residency of the king. Ryang reported that Taikyū was attended on by a hundred women and a hundred men. Okinawan envoys to Korea reported that Taikyū was protected by an all-female royal bodyguard, armed with swords, as regular soldiers were not allowed inside the royal residence. He directly oversaw disputes and criminal proceedings in the kingdom.

Taikyū was a consistent sponsor of Zen Buddhism, overseeing the construction of four Zen temples; Chūzan shifted away from a reliance on Chinese officials as ministers in favor of Japanese Buddhist priests. Near Shuri, he oversaw the foundation of the Buddhist temple of Tenkai-ji. A Japanese Zen monk named Keiin won the king's favor, and was given permission to establish the temples of Kogan-ji, Fumon-ji, and Tenryu-ji, the last named for an influential Zen temple in Kyoto. Taikyū commissioned ten large bronze bells during his reign, most of which he donated to the Zen temples. The most of important of these, the Bridge of Nations Bell (Bankoku shinryō no kane), was cast by a Japanese metalworker and placed on display in front of the rebuilt palace. The bell features an inscription by Keiin, praising Taikyū with Buddhist language. It praises his "activation of the Three Jewels" and names him the savior of "the masses of the Three Worlds", possibly in emulation of the Buddhist conception of the chakravartin, a benevolent universal ruler. Keiin's inscription also states that Taikyū gathered together "wen and wu" and the "excellence of Korea", indicating influence from Chinese and Korean culture.

The first Ryukyuan coins, the Taisei Tsūhō, were minted under Taikyū's reign. Their inscription and name takes a character from his posthumous name, Oyō-no-Nushi. Made by modifying worn and damaged Chinese cash coins from the Yongle Emperor's reign, they were poor quality and may have been made to supplement imported cash coinage from China and showcase the legitimacy of Taikyū's rule.

==== Amawari-Gosamaru conflict ====
In 1458, an uprising broke out against Taikyū's rule. The official histories describe Amawari, the aji (lord) of Katsuren, lying to Taikyū that Gosamaru of Nakagusuku had been scheming against his rule. Surrounded, Gosamaru committed suicide in order not to betray Taikyū, while Amawari prepared for a surprise attack on Taikyū to take the throne for himself. Uni-Ufugusuku, Taikyū's successor as aji of Goeku, was opposed to the plot, and informed Momoto-fumiagari, the wife of Amawari and daughter of Taikyū. Together, they fled to Shuri, where they organized an army and performed divine songs to summon a powerful storm and defeat Amawari. This narrative closely follows conventions of tragic folk heroes, and is unlikely to be true. As the official histories portray Okinawa as having been a unified kingdom for several centuries by the time of Taikyū, wars with neighboring polities and aji may have been reinterpreted as rebellions in later retellings.

Taikyū's territory of firm control was likely initially limited to the region around Shuri and Naha, alongside Goeku in central Okinawa. After the 1458 conflict, he gained control of Nakagusuku and Katsuren and their lucrative trade connections to the Joseon dynasty of Korea. This trade was redirected to Shuri, making it the primary center of trade with Japan, Korea, and China on the island.

=== Succession and legacy ===
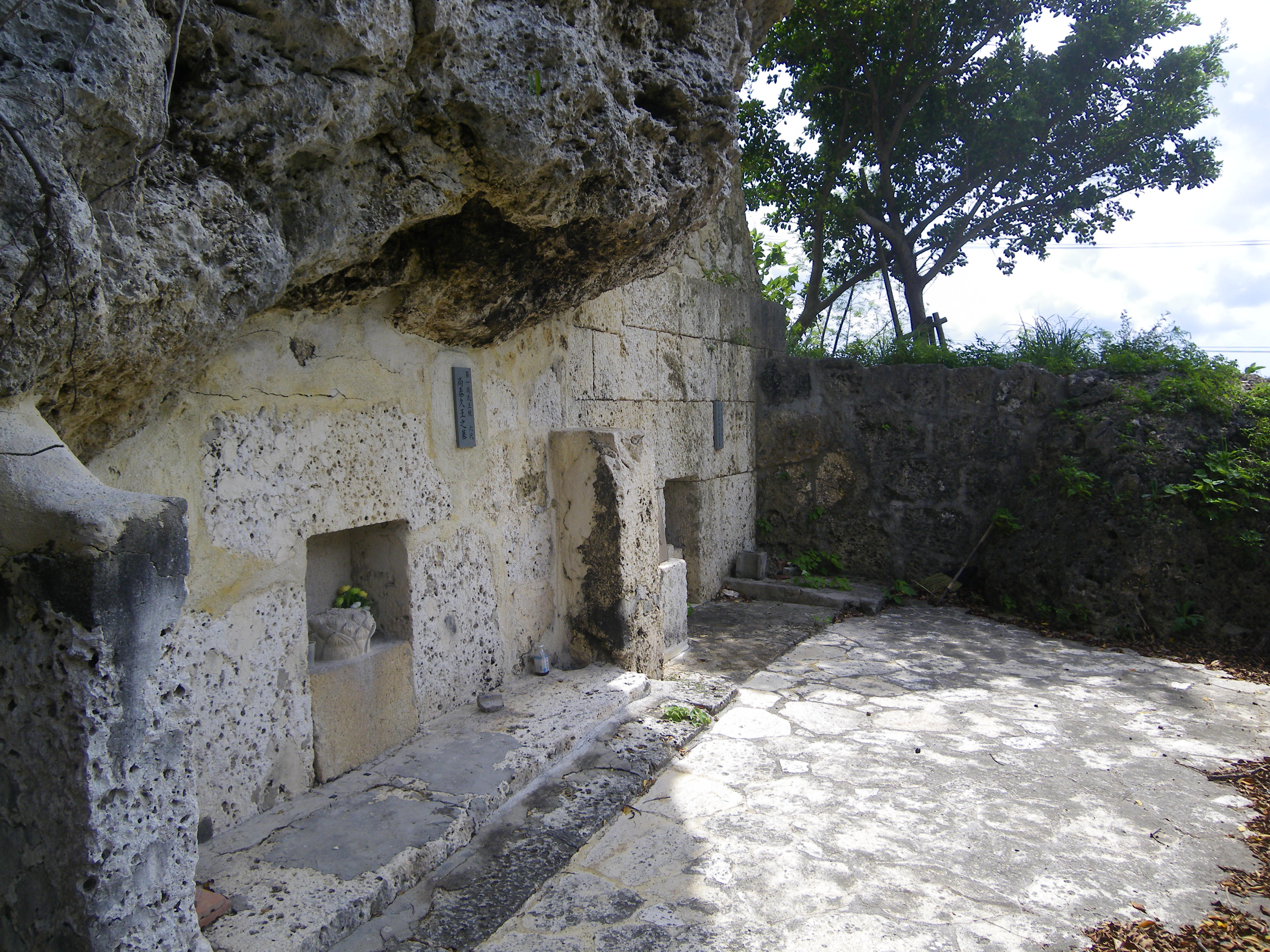
Mausoleum of Shō Taikyū, Nanjō

Taikyū died in 1460 with no recorded cause of death; his remains were taken to Goeku and placed in a form of tomb usually reserved for victims of leprosy. Many of his close allies went into hiding under the reign of his successor, Shō Toku, suggesting that Taikyū may have been killed or overthrown. Taikyū's remains were moved several times. Since 1910, they have been housed at a mausoleum in Fusato, Nanjō, near Furi's tomb.

Toku is recorded in official histories as Taikyū's third or seventh son. Due to the chaotic beginnings of his reign, Smits theorizes that he may have been an unrelated wakō pirate leader who took the throne in order to monopolize Chūzan's trade connections. His rule is described in the official histories as tyrannical, leading to his death (possibly via a coup d'état) and the enthronement of Kanemaru, who took the name Shō En and founded the Second Shō dynasty.

Both the official histories of the Ryukyu Kingdom and the Omoro Sōshi depict Taikyū positively, likely due to his connections with Kanemaru. Taikyū reportedly sheltered the refugee peasant Kanemaru and appointed him as the harbourmaster of Naha and the lord of Uchima. Smits theorizes that his biography may have been embellished by the official histories, and that Kanemaru may have already been the lord of Uchima and simply allied with Taikyū. Taikyū is given the divine name Nanoshiyomoi in the 18th century history Chūzan Seifu.

== Notes ==
=== Bibliography ===
- Ikemiya, Masaharu (2007). 琉球国王の神号と『おもろさうし』 [The Divine Names of the Kings of Ryukyu and the Omoro Sōshi]. 日本東洋文化論集 [Collection of Japanese Oriental Culture Studies] (Thesis) (in Japanese). University of the Ryukyus. pp. 1–27.
- Kerr, George H. (2000) [1958]. Okinawa: The History of an Island People. Rutland: Tuttle Publishing. ISBN 9780804820875.
- McNally, Mark T. (2015). "A King's Legitimacy and a Kingdom's Exceptionality: Ryūkyū's Bankoku Shinryō no Kane of 1458" (PDF). International Journal of Okinawan Studies. 6: 87–103.
- Nelson, Thomas (2006). "Japan in the Life of Early Ryukyu". The Journal of Japanese Studies. 32 (2): 367–392. doi:10.1353/jjs.2006.0058.
- Pearson, Richard (2013). Ancient Ryukyu: An Archaeological Study of Island Communities. Honolulu: University of Hawai'i Press. ISBN 9780824837129. JSTOR j.ctt6wqnq6.
- Smits, Gregory (2008). "Money in the Kingdom of Ryukyu". In Hirzel, Thomas; Kim, Nanny (eds.). Metals, Monies, and Markets in Early Modern Societies: East Asian and Global Perspectives. Vol. 1. Münster: LIT Verlag. pp. 107–118. ISBN 9783825808228.
- Smits, Gregory (2019). Maritime Ryukyu, 1050–1650. Honolulu: University of Hawai'i Press. doi:10.2307/j.ctvsrfmz. ISBN 9780824877095. JSTOR j.ctvsrfmz.
- Smits, Gregory (2019b). "Rethinking Early Ryukyuan History" (PDF). The Asian-Pacific Journal: Japan Focus. 17 (7): 1–12.
- Smits, Gregory (2024). Early Ryukyuan History: A New Model. Honolulu: University of Hawai'i Press. doi:10.2307/jj.8441682. ISBN 9780824898205.

Regnal titles
Preceded by Shō Kinpuku	King of Chūzan (or Ryukyu); 1454–1460	Succeeded by Shō Toku
