= Amawari =

Ryukyuan Lord of Katsuren Castle (d. 1458)

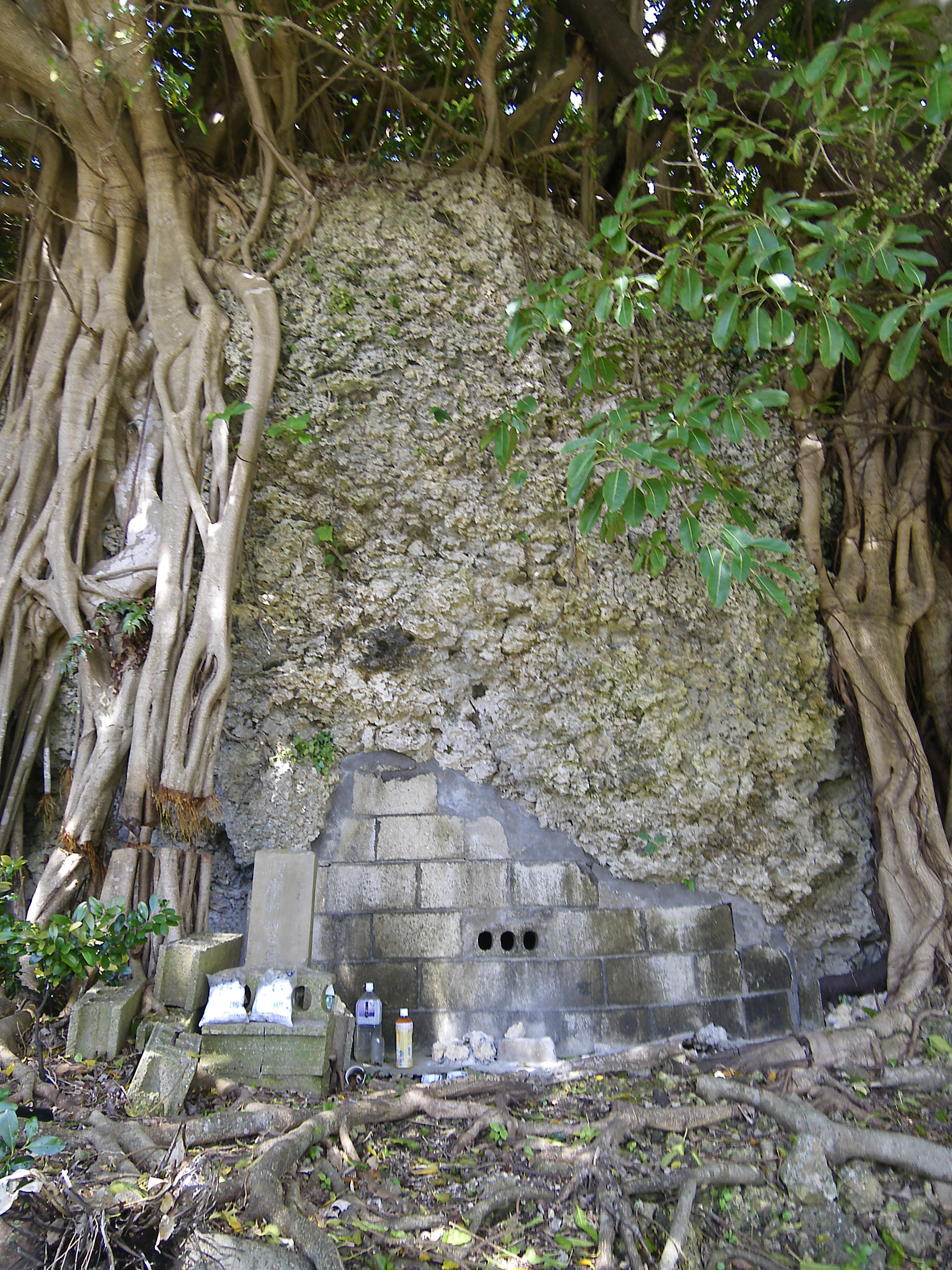
Tomb of Amawari, the 10th lord (Aji) of Katsuren Castle

Amawari (阿麻和利; Okinawan: Amawari/Amaohe/Amaui; d. 1458) was a Ryukyuan Lord (Aji) of Katsuren Castle, known for his ambitions for the throne of the Ryukyu Kingdom and scheme and attack against Gosamaru, Aji of Yomitanzan and Nakagusuku.

== Life ==
Amawari was born to a peasant family in Yara, in Chatan Magiri (now Kadena). Overthrowing the Katsuren Aji, Amawari seized his domain. Taking advantage of opportunities for maritime trade, he gained a degree of wealth and power, and married Momoto-fumiagari, daughter of King Shō Taikyū, further solidifying his power.

Anxious about Amawari's power, King Shō Taikyū asked Gosamaru, who had helped Shō Taikyū's father invade Hokuzan in 1416, to build Nakagusuku Castle between Katsuren and the royal capital of Shuri. In 1458, Amawari accused Gosamaru of plotting to overthrow the king, and as a result came to lead the royal armies in an attack on Nakagusuku which ended in Gosamaru's death by suicide. The King discovered Amawari's treachery, and sent his army, led by Uni-Ufugusuku, to Katsuren Castle, where Amawari was defeated and executed. It has been theorized that the entire affair was organized by the royal government, in order to remove both Gosamaru and Amawari as powerful rivals and potential threats to the succession.
