= Uni-Ufugusuku =

Samurai martial arts master and Ryukyu general

Ufugusuku Kenyu
- 大城賢雄
- Born: early 1400s
- Died: 1469
- Resting place: Chibana Castle
- Other names: Ōshiro Kenyu (大城賢雄); Uni Ufugusuku (鬼大城)
- Known for: Okinawan Martial Arts
- Height: Greater than 6 ft 0 in (1.83 m)
- Title: Aji of Goeku Magiri
- Spouse: Momoto Fumiagari (百度踏揚)

Uni-Ufugusuku (鬼大城), or Ufugusuku Kenyu/Ufugushiku Kenyu/Ōshiro Kenyu (大城賢雄 also 大城賢勇) (fl. 15th century), was a samurai martial arts master and Ryukyuan general who served the Ryukyu Kingdom. "Uni" is an Okinawan cognate of the Japanese "oni," which means ogre. He received this nickname because he was about 6 feet (1.8 metres) tall. He was the personal attendant of King Shō Taikyū's daughter, and lived in Katsuren Castle when she married the Aji Amawari. During the Aji's infamous grab for power in 1458, Ufugusuku took the King's daughter back to Shuri Castle. He led the Ryūkyūan army to depose Amawari, and personally executed him. He later became Aji of Goeku Magiri, residing in Chibana Castle, and married the king's daughter. He was expelled after the First Shō Dynasty fell and later committed suicide. His tomb is at Chibana Castle, in Chibana, Okinawa City, dug into the hillside next to his wife's tomb.

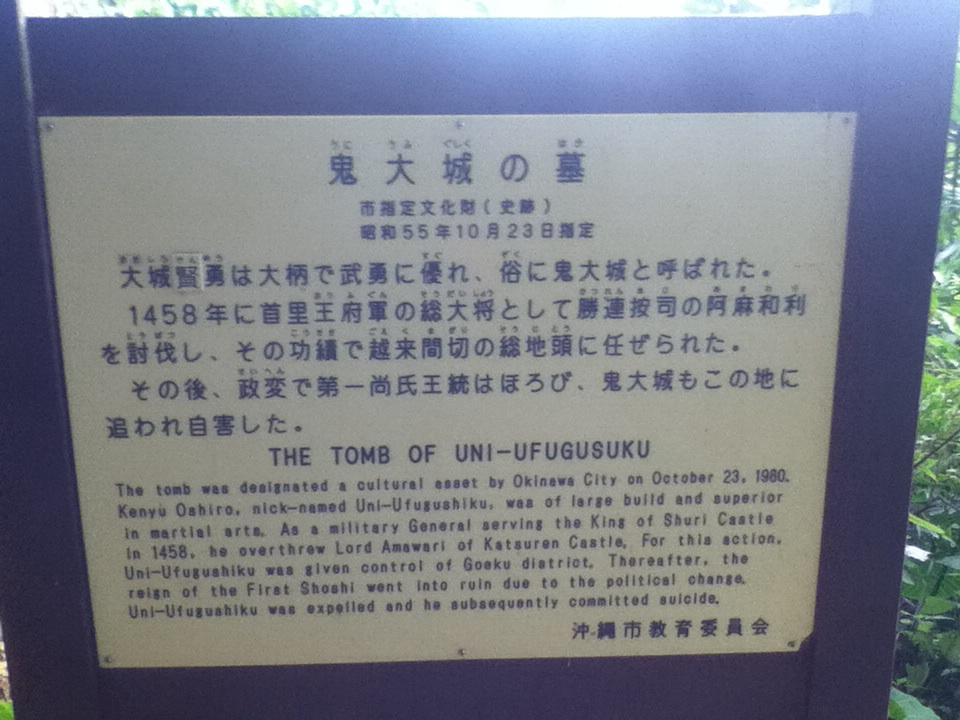

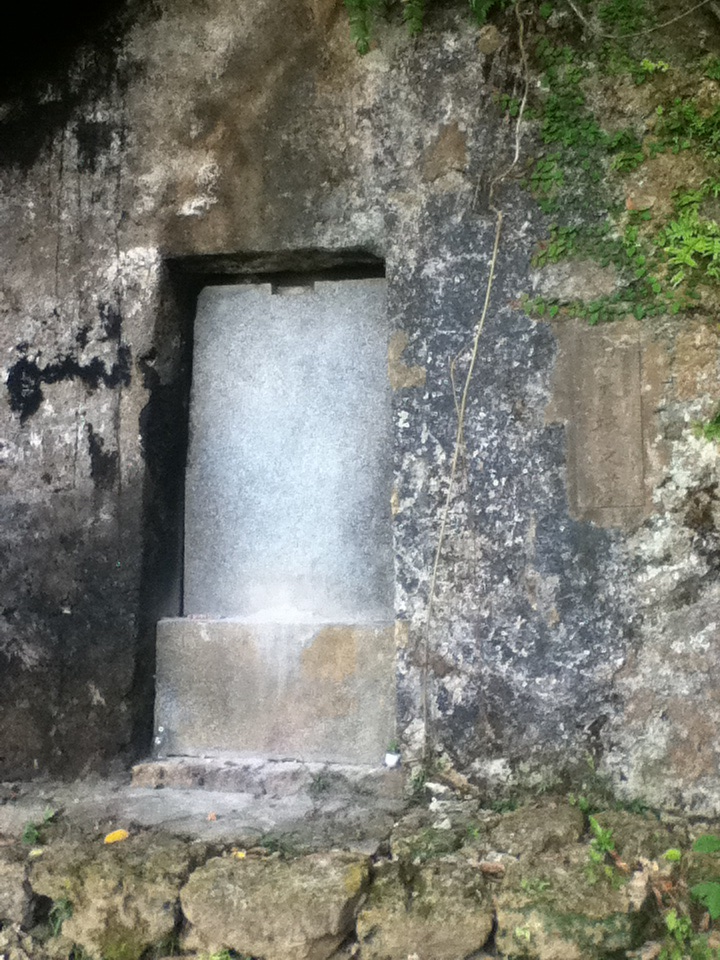
Tomb of Uni-Ufugusuku at Chibana Castle.
