= Nakagusuku, Okinawa =

Nakagusuku 中城村
- Village
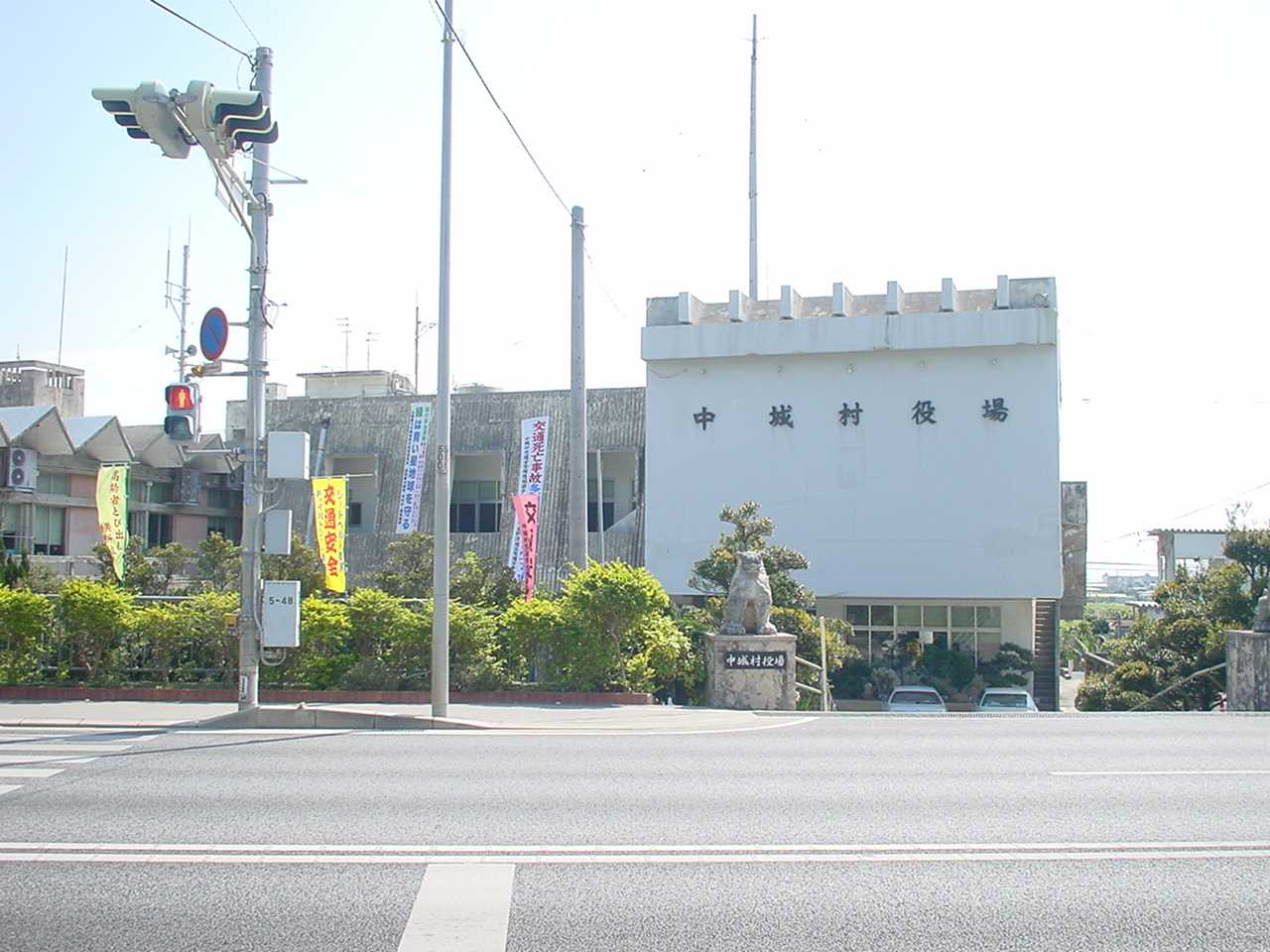
- Nakagusuku Village Office

- Flag Seal

- Location of Nakagusuku in Okinawa Prefecture

- Location in Japan
- Coordinates: 26°16′4″N 127°47′29″E
- Country: Japan
- Region: Ryukyu
- Prefecture: Okinawa Prefecture
- District: Nakagami

Government
  - Mayor: Keisuke Hamada

Area
  - Total: 15.46 km^{2} (5.97 sq mi)

Population (October 1, 2020)
  - Total: 22,157
  - Density: 1,433/km^{2} (3,712/sq mi)
- Time zone: UTC+09:00 (JST)
- City hall address: 176 Tōma, Nakagusuku-mura, Nakagami-gun; 901-2493
- Website: www.vill.nakagusuku.okinawa.jp in Japanese
- Symbols
- Fish: Ijukin (Threadfin bream)
- Flower: Hibiscus
- Tree: Ebony

Nakagusuku (中城村, Nakagusuku-son; Okinawan: Nakagushiku) is a village located in Nakagami District, Okinawa Prefecture, Japan. As of 1 August 2024, the village has an estimated population of 22,647 and a density of 1,465 persons per km^{2}. The total area is 15.53 km^{2}. The ruins of a gusuku (Ryukyuan castle), Nakagusuku Castle, are also in this village. It is famous for its ancient Chinese dance, Tafaku, which has been handed down for generations. The village is an agricultural village, with its main crop being sugar cane (Okinawan: wuuji. Japanese: satokibi). It is also known for its white or yellow colored carrots. Ryukyu University is partially located within Nakagusuku, and partially in the neighboring town of Nishihara. Nakagusuku features one of the largest percentages of people of Okinawan descent who immigrated overseas out of all the districts in Okinawa.

== Geography ==
Nakagusuku village is made up of 18 different aza (Okinawan: mura). Every aza has its own unique subculture. The 18 azas are: Arakachi, Asado, Haama, Iiju, Isshado, Kita Haama, Kita Uebaru, Kuba, Minami Haama, Minami Uebaru, Noborimate, Soeishi, Touma, Tsuha, Tumai (Tomari), Ukuma (Okuma), Wooki (Wauke), Yagi.

Hills (or small mountains) make up most of Nakagusuku's western and north-western land area. The land towards to ocean is mostly flat, providing ample room for farming. Since ancient times Nakagusuku's shorelines have provided an abundance of fish, seaweed, salt, and other sea products, for the people of the village.

Nakagusuku is bordered by Kitanakagusuku to the north, Nishihara (Nishibaru) to the Southwest, and Ginowan (Jinoon) to the west. To the east lies Nakagusuku Bay.

== History ==
The earliest known human habitation of present-day Nakagusuku village began sometime around the year 900–1000, in what is currently aza Arakachi. Later, Nakagusuku Castle was started, becoming the most dominant gusuku (or town center) of the area. Around the year 1440, Gosamaru was ordered to move from Zakimi Castle to Nakagusuku Castle, and a number of residents of Yomitan followed him. These followers and their descendants would form much of present-day Nakagusuku village, including the aza's of Tumai, Isshado, and Kuba. To this day, many Nakagusuku residents have a number of relatives in Yomitan. Under the Ryukyu Kingdom, Nakagusuku Castle served as the headquarters of Nakagushiku Majiri, though culturally people identified most strongly and interacted most closely within their own mura (Japanese: aza).

After the annexation of Ryukyu by Japan in 1879, the Japanese government did away with the majiri system, and formed Nakagusuku village (Japanese: son). Thus, Nakagusuku village is a relatively modern formation, and there remains a relatively strong sense of cultural uniqueness among Nakagusuku's azas. Nakagusuku's immigrant population living abroad, particularly in Hawai'i (since Hawai'i's Okinawan immigrants were among the earliest in the Okinawan diaspora), especially feel a stronger attachment to their aza, rather than to Nakagusuku village at large.

Nakagusuku was formerly combined with the modern day village of Kita Nakagusuku. However, after World War II, the U.S. occupied Okinawa and took part of Nakagusuku village (aza Kuba), which geographically divided Nakagusuku into two separate parts. The more northern part split off into a separate village, calling themselves Kita Nakagusuku. In more recent years, there have been discussions about the possibility of reuniting the two Nakagusukus, since the military base at Kuba is no longer there. However, the Kita Nakagusuku residents have generally opposed reunification, citing their own unique cultural differences.

== Mascot ==
The village character (Mascot) is Gosamaru, who was the most famous resident of the castle. He holds a battle fan in one hand, and a carrot in the other. Nakagusuku village is famous for its almost white carrots, which are a point of civic pride.

== Historic locations ==
Nakagusuku Castle

- Asado House (Okinawan: Asado ya. Japanese: Asato no tera). A traditional Okinawan house built over an utaki generations ago. The utaki itself likely predates the structure. The structure miraculously escaped the war unscathed. It remains a sacred place of worship for many in Nakagushiku, as well as for pilgrims from outside the village.
- The Big Tropical Almond Tree. (Okinawan: Ukwadisa, Japanese: Okwadisa). It was planted over 200 years ago by an official from Shuri, who was sad at having to return to Shuri on official orders, and planted the tree as a symbol of friendship with the people of Tumai village (now part of Nakagusuku village). The tree has been studied by botanists for its scientific value, and is an officially designated historical site by the village. The Shuri official had planted a second tree just a block down the street from the first, but this second tree was destroyed by the American military during the Battle of Okinawa. It was replanted after the war.
- Nakagusuku Castle. One of Ryukyu's most famous gushiku. Nakagusuku shares it with the neighboring village of Kita Nakagusuku. It is an UNESCO World Heritage Site and one of the 100 most famous castles in Japan.
- The Three Trees of Isshado. Around 1600, three banyan trees (Okinawan: Gajimaru) were planted in commemoration of the founding of the aza of Isshado in its present location. (It had originally been located further up the mountain near Nakagusuku Castle.) The trees remain in their original locations, and are currently in their fourth generation.

=== Cultural and natural assets ===
Nakagusuku Village hosts forty-seven cultural properties and monuments, some of them designated at the national, prefectural or municipal level.

- Name (Japanese) (Type of registration)

==== Cultural Properties ====
- Arakaki Stone Bridge (新垣の石橋) (Municipal)
- "Hana-no-Ishadō" song stele (花の伊舎堂歌碑)
- Nakagusuku Castle Site (中城城跡) (Prefectural)
- Stele of the post-war repatriates landing point (戦後引揚者上陸碑)
- War victims memorial/Peace waves/Peace wind (慰霊之塔・平和の波・平和の風)

==== Folk Cultural Properties ====
- Agari-nu-tun and Jitū-tun Sacred Sites in Yagi (アガリ之殿と地頭殿 (屋宜))
- Arakachi Miijā-gā spring (新垣のミージャーガー)
- Arakaki-nu-tun (新垣ノ殿)
- Asato Mura-gā well (安里のムラガー)
- Asato-no-tera Sacred Site (安里のテラ) (Prefectural)
- Funangwa-nu-tun Sacred Site in Iju (フナングヮぬ殿 (伊集))
- Fusatu-nu-tun Sacred Site in Tsuha (富里之殿 (津覇))
- Giisu-no-tera Sacred Site (ギイスのテラ)
- Iibi-nu-mee Utaki Sacred Site in Okuma (イベノマエノ嶽 (奥間))
- Iju Noro Dunchi Sacred Site (伊集ノロ殿内)
- Iju Noro Hi-nu-kan fire god altar (伊集ノロ火の神)
- Ishadō Rinkun-gā spring (伊舎堂のリンクンガー)
- Ishadō Shrine (伊舎堂のお宮)
- Itokama-no-taki Sacred Site in Tsuha (糸蒲ノ嶽 (津覇))
- Kaminii Utaki Sacred Site in Okuma (神根之嶽 (奥間))
- Kishimaku Utaki Sacred Site in Kitauehara (キシマコノ獄 (北上原))
- Kuba Mura-gā spring (久場のムラガー)
- Kuba Utaki Sacred Site (久場の御嶽)
- Okuma Ubu-gā well (奥間のウブガー)
- Soeshi Noro Hi-nu-kan fire god altar (添石ノロ火の神)
- Tamagusuku-nu-tun Sacred Site in Yagi (玉城之殿 (屋宜))
- Tōma-nu-tun / Tungwa Sacred Site (当間の殿)
- Tomari Shicha-nu-kā spring (泊のシチャヌカー)
- Tsuha gan'yā palanquin house (津覇の龕屋)
- Tsuha-no-tera Sacred Site (津覇のテラ)
- Tsuha Ubu-gā well (津覇のウブガー)
- Tun'nā Sacred Site (上久場之殿)
- Wauke Ugan Praying Site (和宇慶ぬウガン)
- Yagiminatobishi Oibe Praying Site (屋宜湊干瀬ノ御イベ)
- Yagi Mura-gā well (屋宜のムラガー)
- Yagi Noro Hi-nu-kan fire god altar (屋宜ノロ火の神)
- Yagi Funi-gā well (屋宜のフニガー)
- Yūjidun Praying Site in Iju (世持殿 (ユージドゥン))

==== Historic Sites ====
- Arakachi Gusuku (新垣グスク)
- Dē Gusuku (Kuba) (台グスク(久場))
- Gosamaru's tomb (Kuba) (護佐丸の墓(久場))
- Kishiibaru Old Tomb Complex (喜石原古墓群)
- Nakagusuku Castle Site (中城城跡) (National)
- Nakagusuku Hanta Road (中城ハンタ道) (National)
- Perry's Banner Rock (ペリーの旗立岩) (Municipal)
- Prefectural Road Opening Memorial (県道開削記念碑) (Municipal)
- Three banyan trees in front of Ishadō (伊舎堂前の三本ガジマル) (Municipal)

==== Places of scenic beauty ====
- Nakagusuku Castle Site (中城城跡) (Prefectural)

==== Natural Monuments ====
- Tomari's Large Sea Almond tree (泊の大クワディーサー) (Municipal)

== Notable modern locations ==
- The abandoned hotel located next to Nakagusuku Castle: during construction, a number of strange and unfortunate events happened, including the casualties of construction workers. As a result, work was abandoned, and the hotel frame remains as it was left. It is rumored to be haunted.
- Gosamaru Historical Archives and Library. Located next to Yoshinoura Park, this new library/museum was opened in 2017. It contains a wealth of history regarding Nakagusuku.
- Mermaid Statues: Two mermaid statues look over the beach at Kuba, Nakagusuku. The statues are located next to Nakagusuku Mall, and are a frequent photo spot for tourists.
- Ryukyu University, which is partially located in Nakagusuku, and partially in the neighboring town of Nishihara.
- Yoshinoura Park. Features a track, adult-size baseball field, playground, gymnasium, grand hall, and many meeting rooms.

== Events ==
On the fourth Sunday of every month there is a small Farmer's Market only for old and young people to participate in. It usually has between 4 and 10 vendors at Yoshinoura Park, and is held between 9:00am to 12:00 noon. In November the village hosts its cultural festival, celebrating its rich cultural heritages, including Tafaku, Eisa, Ryukyu dance, Shishimai, Kwimiudui (Japanese: Kumiodori), uta sanshin, and ti (Japanese: karate), among others.

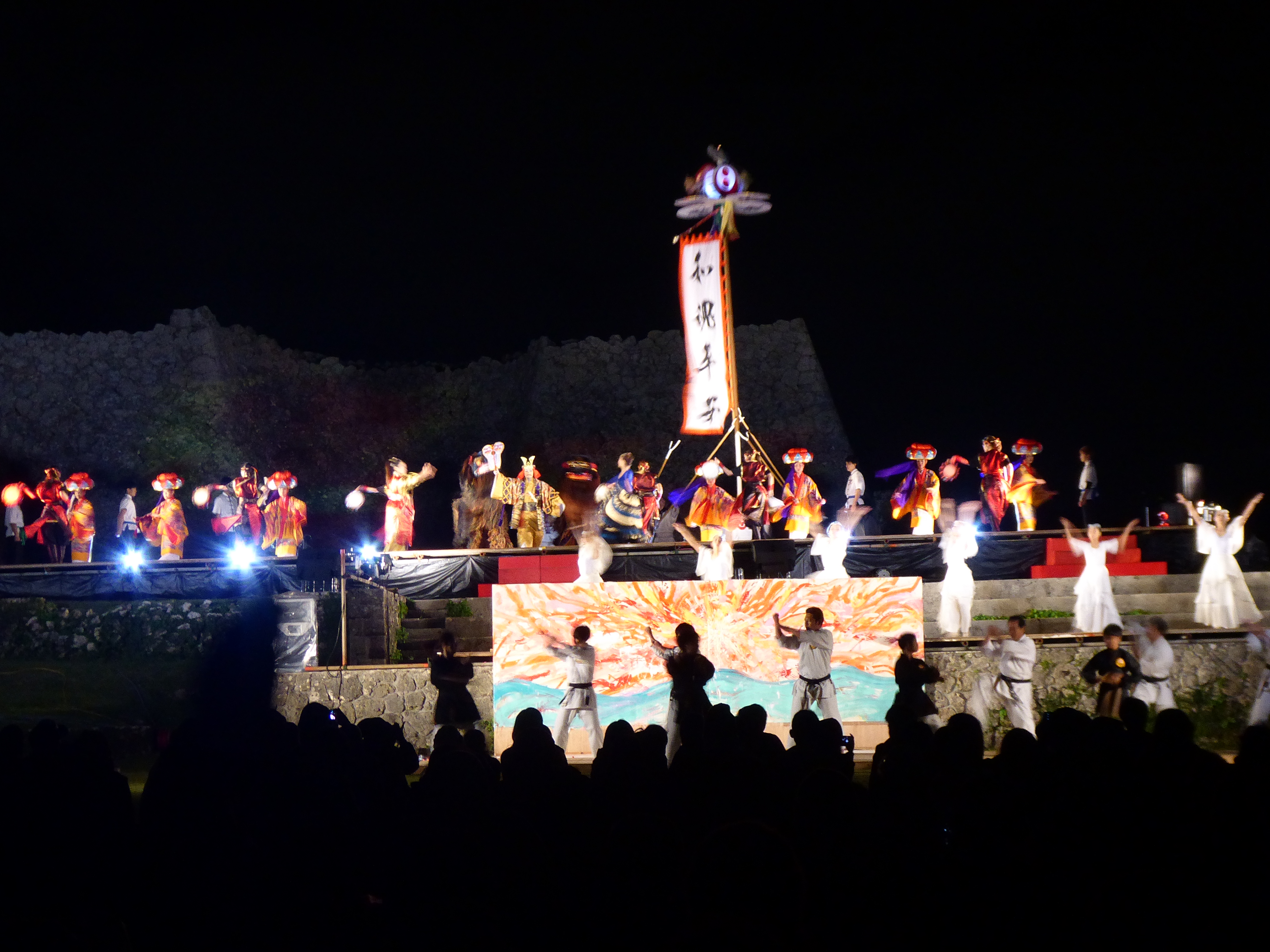
Nakagusuku's Projection Mapping festival, 2017.

Also in November, the village hosts its annual Projection Mapping Festival on the grounds of Nakagusuku Castle. The event features a unique combination of Nakagusuku cultural groups performing in common theme. The highlight of the night is a mini-film projected onto the walls of the castle itself. The event is attended by tens of thousands of people from around Okinawa.

== Education ==
Municipal schools include:

- Nakagusuku Junior High School (中城中学校)
- Nakagusuku Elementary School (中城小学校)
- Nakagusuku Minami (South) Elementary School (中城南小学校)
- Tsuha Elementary School (津覇小学校)

== Tafaku ==
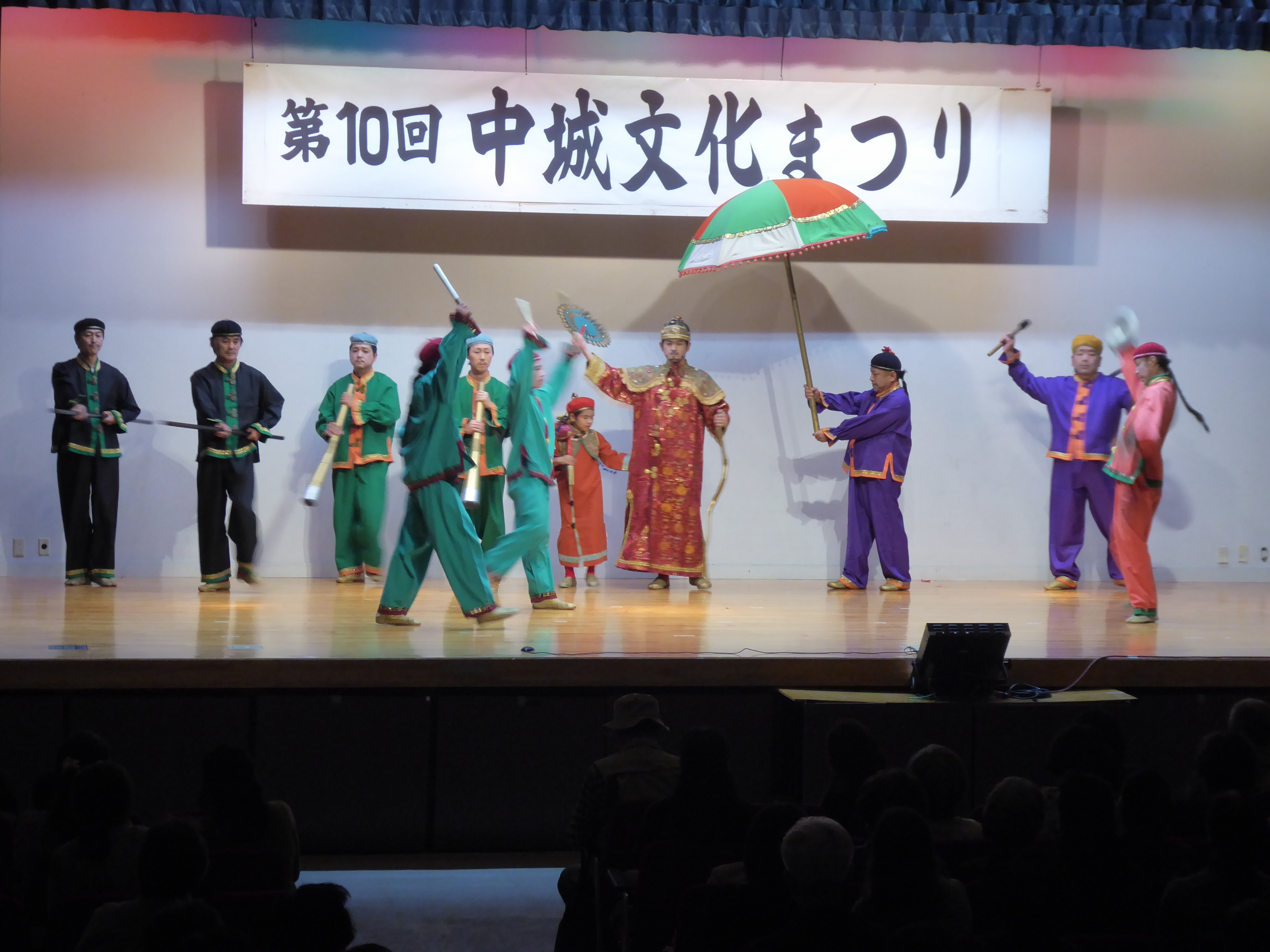
Tafaku performed at the Nakagusuku Cultural Festival, 2017.

Iiju, an aza of Nakagusuku village, is famous for its traditional Chinese Tafaku dance. The dance has been handed down for generations, and is the only one of its kind in all of Ryukyu. The dance is performed around the similar time as Bon, and draws a large crowd of people both from within Nakagusuku and visitors from outside the village. Tafaku is characterized by its dancers wearing brightly colored traditional Qing-era costumes, including queue wigs. One performer acts as the "father," a young boy acts as the "son," who both are accompanied by an entourage of attendants and dancers. Most of the dancing is done by three individuals who repeat acrobatic bends and movements while playing traditional Chinese instruments, such as cymbals. It is said that the movements of Tafaku are so strenuous that only individuals in their early 20s or younger have the ability to perform it.

Similar in sacredness to traditional Eisa, the Tafaku practitioners are natives of Iiju aza, Nakagushiku village.

== Prince of Nakagusuku ==
Nakagusuku is also famous for being part of the former magiri (domain) of the Crown Prince of the Ryukyu Kingdom. Styled as Nakagusuku Ōji (中城王子, lit. "Nakagusuku Prince"), the Crown Prince, as heir to the kingdom, resided in Nakagusuku-udun (中城御殿), a palace near Shuri Castle. Nakagusuku Castle was also within his domain.

== Notable people from Nakagusuku ==
- Kaori Futenma, singer-songwriter
- Tsuyoshi Hamada, former boxer
- Tatsuhiro Oshiro, novelist and playwright
- Shinsaburo Tawata, professional baseball player
- Wally Yonamine, professional baseball and football player
