= Konkōkenshū =

1711 Okinawan dictionary

Konkōkenshū (混効験集; literally "list of mixed effective [words]") is the first dictionary of the Okinawan language and the first of any Ryukyuan language. The dictionary was compiled by a group of seven people under the order of King Shō Tei, dated no later than 1711.

Konkōkenshū contains many archaic words and expressions remembered by an elder woman of the royal court that served three kings, and cites works such as the Omoro Sōshi, an Old Okinawan anthology, The Tale of Genji, and The Tales of Ise, which are works written in Early Middle Japanese.

== Volumes ==
There are two volumes in Konkōkenshū, a kenkan (乾巻) and a konkan (坤巻), corresponding to the hexagrams in I Ching.

The entries in each of the volumes are sorted by thematic order:

- The kenkan includes the following 11 themes: heaven and earth (乾坤) humanity (人倫), seasons (時候), branches of the bodies (支体), types of feelings (気形), herbs (草木), tools (器材), housing (家屋), clothes (衣服), and food and drink/beverages (飲食). This volume contains approximately 380 entries.
- The konkan includes the following 12 themes: heaven and earth (乾坤), the heavenly gods (神祇), humanity (人倫), tools (器材), feelings (気形), herbs (草木), seasons (時候), branches of the bodies (支体), and food and drink/beverages (飲食). This volume contains approximately 720 entries.

According to Lawrence (2015:158), the total number of entries in the Konkōkenshū is 1,148 entries, of which 92 of them are duplicates.

== Structure ==
Headwords are written on the top of the page, while the translation and explanation are written on the bottom of the page. The headwords are typically written in hiragana, although some kanji are used.

== Manuscripts ==
Various manuscripts of the Konkōkenshū exist. The Hyōjōsho-bon (評定所本) manuscript is held at the Okinawa Prefectural Museum, and has been thought to be the original text. A facsimile copy of the Hyōjōsho-bon edited by Hokama Shūzen was published by Kadokawa Shoten in 1970.

== Works cited ==
- Lawrence, Wayne (2015). "Lexicon". In Heinrich, Patrick; Miyara, Shinsho; Shimoji, Michinori (eds.). Handbook of the Ryukyuan Languages. Berlin: De Gruyter Mouton. pp. 157–173. ISBN 978-1-61451-161-8.
- Hokama, Shūzen (1994). "日本大百科全書(ニッポニカ) 「混効験集」の意味・わかりやすい解説" [Definition and Easy Explanation of "Konkōkenshū" in Nipponica]. コトバンク (Kotobank).
- Hokama, Shūzen (1995). 沖縄古語大辞典 [Dictionary of Archaic Okinawan]. Tokyo: Kadokawa Shoten.
