= Nakagusuku Castle =

Nakagusuku Castle 中城城
- Kitanakagusuku, Okinawa
- Ruins of Nakagusuku Castle (west district)

Site information
- Type: Gusuku
- Open to the public: yes
- Condition: Ruins
- Website: www.nakagusuku-jo.jp/en

Location
- Nakagusuku Castle
- Location within Okinawa Prefecture Location within Japan
- Coordinates: 26°17′02″N 127°48′05″E

Site history
- Built: around 1440
- Built by: Gosamaru
- In use: early 1440-1611
- Materials: Ryūkyūan limestone, wood
- Battles/wars: Attacked by Amawari (1458)

Garrison information
- Occupants: Gosamaru, Aji of Nakagusuku Magiri

UNESCO World Heritage Site
- Criteria: Cultural: ii, iii, vi
- Reference: 972
- Inscription: 2000 (24th Session)
- National Historic Site of Japan

Nakagusuku Castle (中城城, Nakagusuku jō; Okinawan: Nakagushiku) is a Ryukyuan gusuku fortification located in the village of Kitanakagusuku, Okinawa, Japan. It is known for being the best-preserved of any gusuku ruins, and the six courtyards of this fortress with stacked stone walls make it a prime example of a gusuku. It has been protected by the central government as a National Historic Site since 1972. The designated area is 110,473 square meters, of which 14,473 square meters is the castle grounds. In November 2000, it was registered as a UNESCO World Heritage Site as part of the Gusuku Sites and Related Properties of the Kingdom of Ryukyu, along with the Shuri Castle ruins and others.

== Overview ==
Nakagusuku Castle is located on a 160-meter-high hill about two kilometers from Yagi Port, a former trading port. The eastern cliff edge of the hill stretching from northwest to south of Nakagusuku Village, provides a natural defense.

In the late 14th century, several generations of Sachinakagusuku Aji (chiefs) built the main sections of the southern, western, first, and second baileys. In 1440, King Shō Taikyū asked he legendary Ryūkyūan commander Gosamaru, who had helped Shō Taikyū's father invade Hokuzan in 1416, to strength Nakagusuku Castle as a barrier between Katsuren Castle, the stronghold of the ambition Aji Amawari and the royal capital of Shuri. Gosamaru relocated his seat from Zakimi Castle in Yomitan to Nakagusuku and added the third and northern baileys, completing the castle's current appearance. The walls of the expanded sections were constructed using a technique known as "aikata-zumi." Furthermore, since the two other castle gates to the first bailey besides the rear gate were arched, the gate of the first bailey, which housed the palace, was also remodeled to an arched style at the same time. The castle was attacked from the east by Amawari in 1458 in what may have been a ploy by the Shuri royal court, who had become suspicious of Gosamaru's loyalty. Gosamaru was defeated and committed suicide at the castle. Thereafter, the castle served as the "home of Prince Nakagusuku," then as a "guard post" after the Invasion of Ryukyu by Satsuma Domain in 1609. During the Edo period, officials from Satsuma Domain would go into seclusion at Nakagusuku Castle when envoys from Qing dynasty China would arrive on investiture missions for Ryūkyūan kings to maintain the pretense of Ryūkyūan independence.

Nakagusuku Castle was visited by Commodore Matthew C. Perry in March 1853 during the Perry Expedition to end Japan's national seclusion policy. He noted the high level of architectural and civil engineering technology in the castle walls and arched gates, and wrote a detailed report about the castle, stating that the walls seemed to be designed to absorb cannon fire. Following the Meiji restoration and the establishment of Okinawa Prefecture in 1879, the castle was used as the village office for Nakagusuku village. It continued in this role until the end of World War II.

Nakagusuku Castle suffered little damage in the Battle of Okinawa, and in 1955 it was designated an Okinawa Important Cultural Property, Historic Site, and a Place of Scenic Beauty. Subsequently, plans to build a Nakagusuku Kogen Hotel in the castle's main enclosure in order to take advantage of the 1975 Okinawa Ocean Exposition caused controversy and the hotel was never completed.

Nakagusuku Castle was listed as one of Japan's Top 100 Castles by the Japan Castle Foundation in 2006.

== Gallery ==
Model

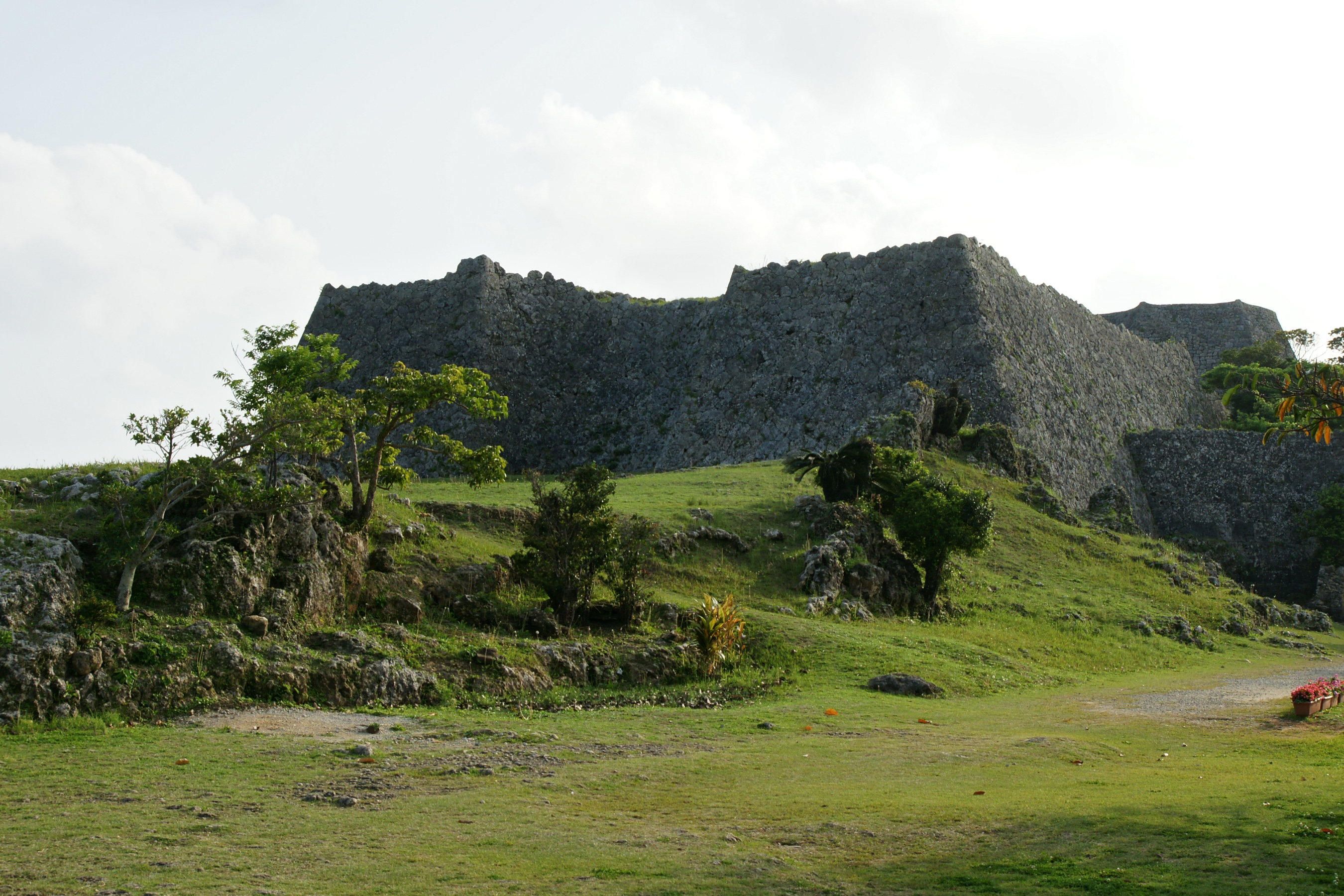
Rampart of the 3rd district

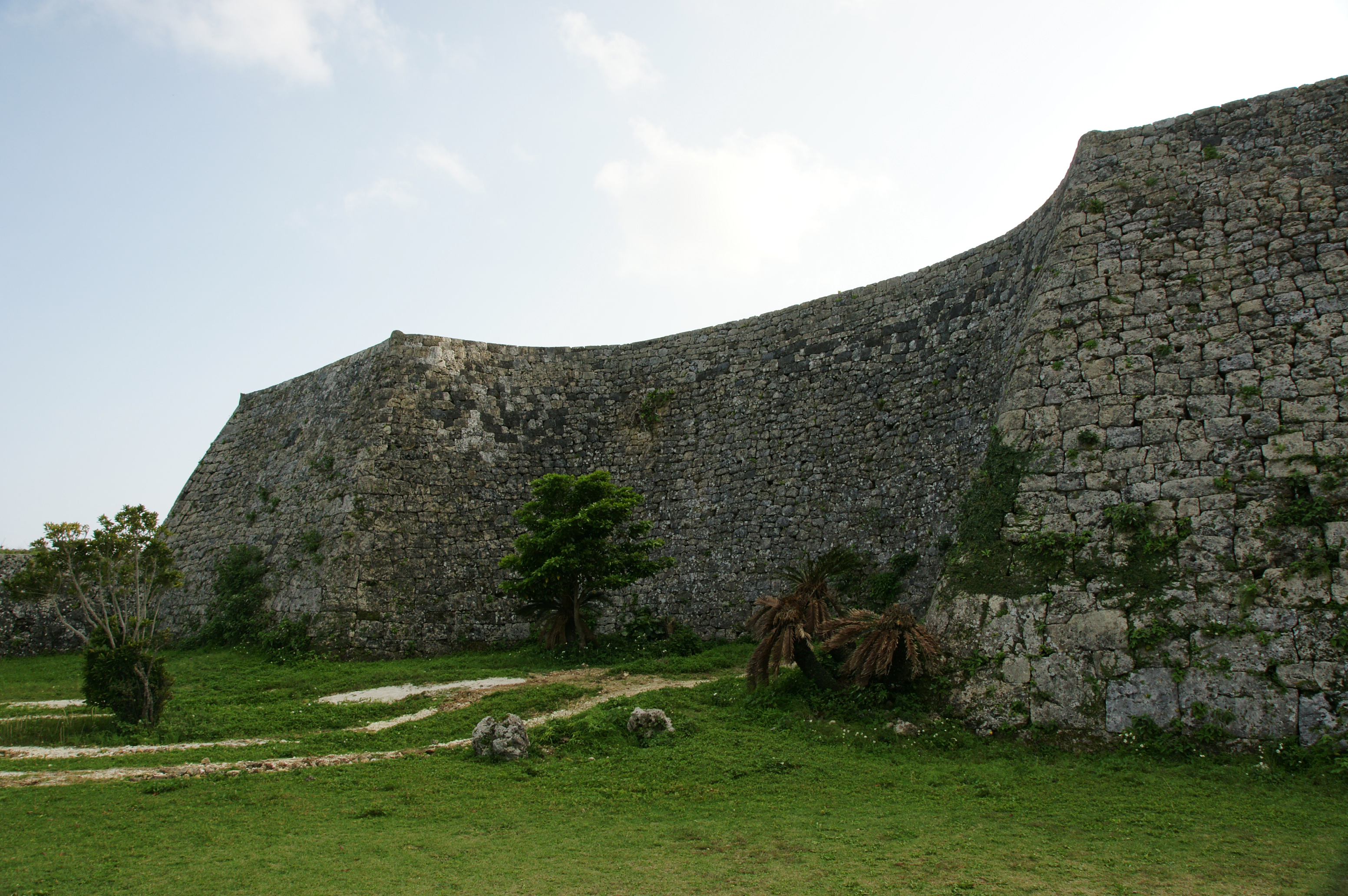
Rampart of the 2nd district

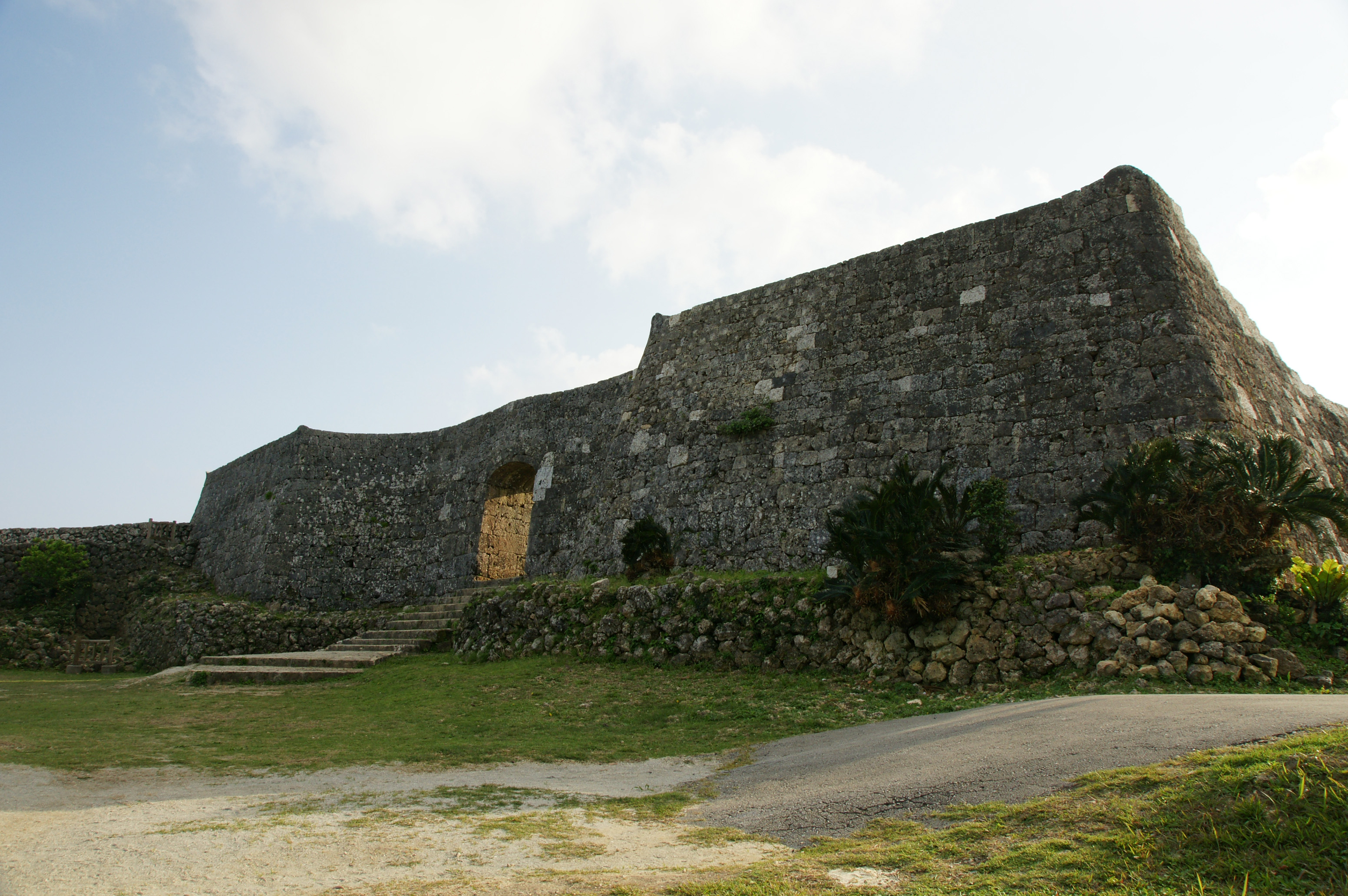
Rampart of the 1st district

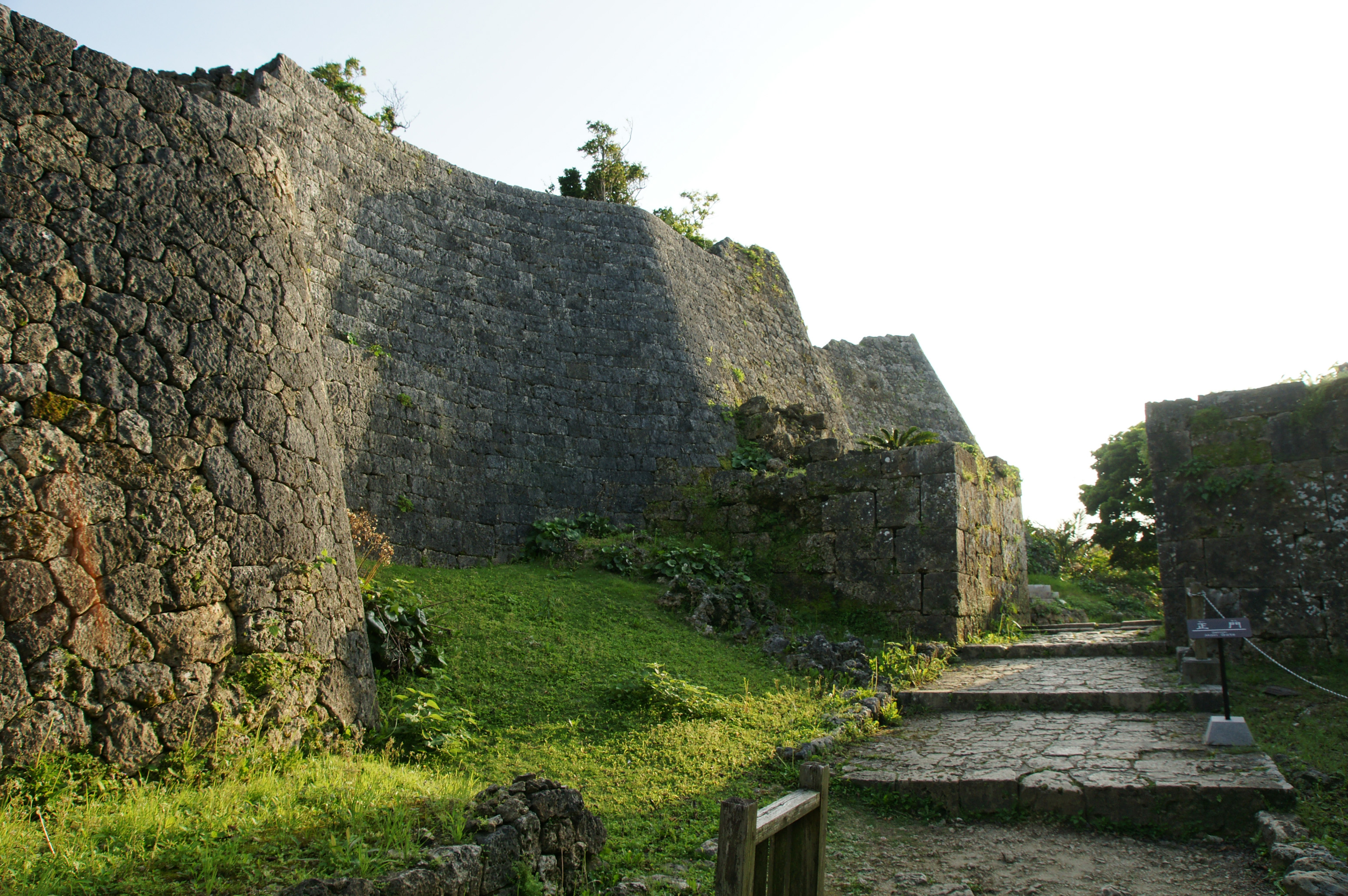

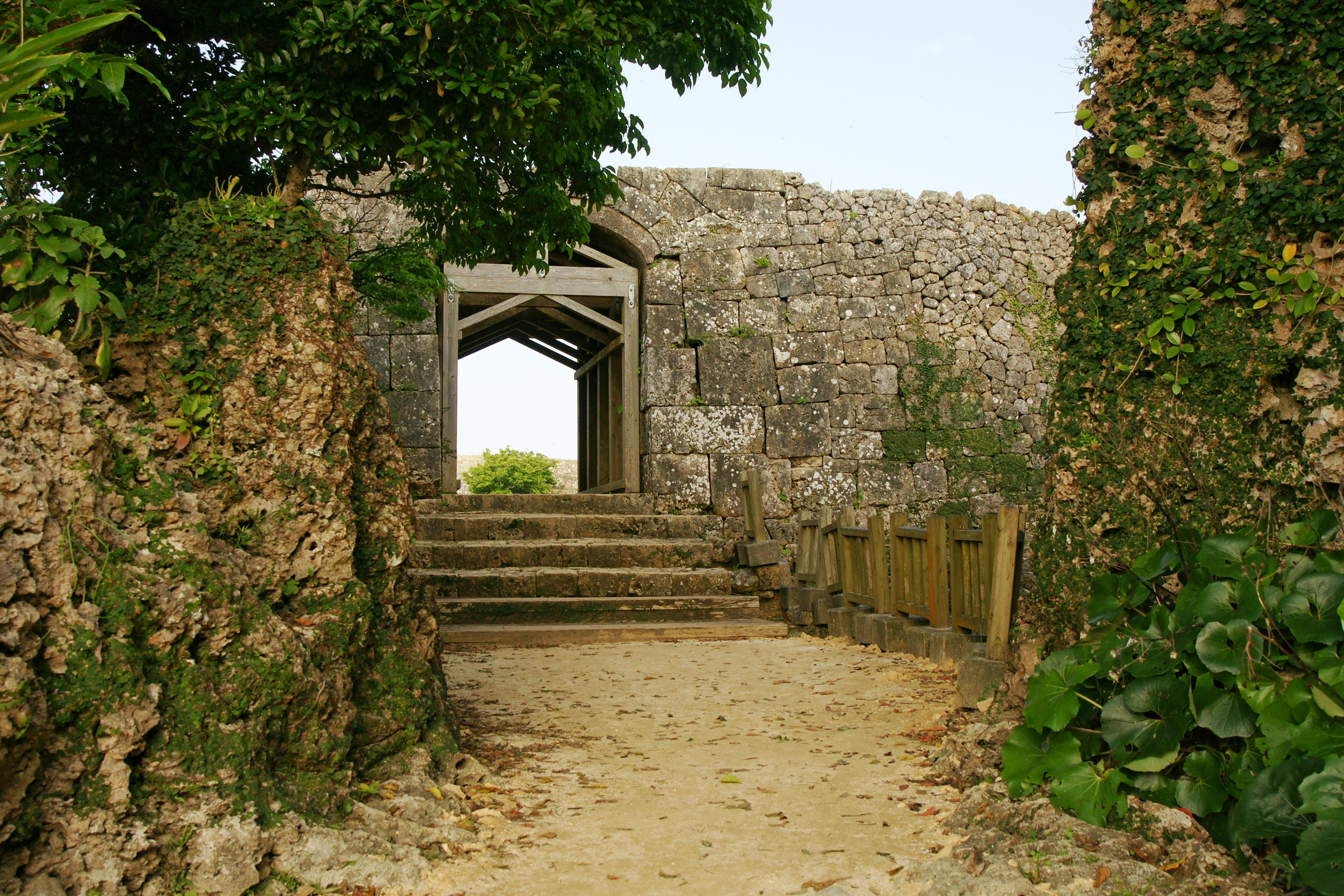

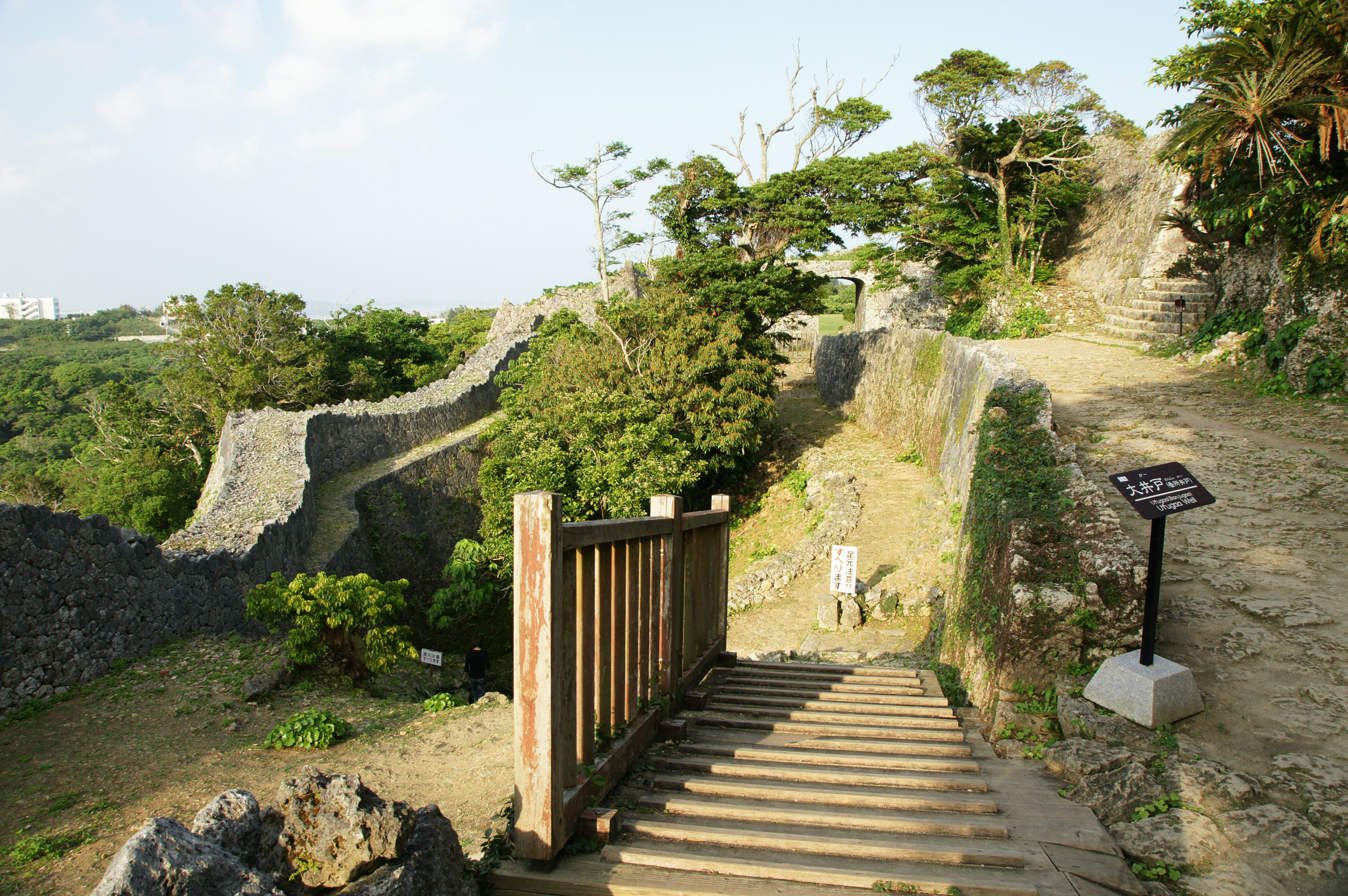

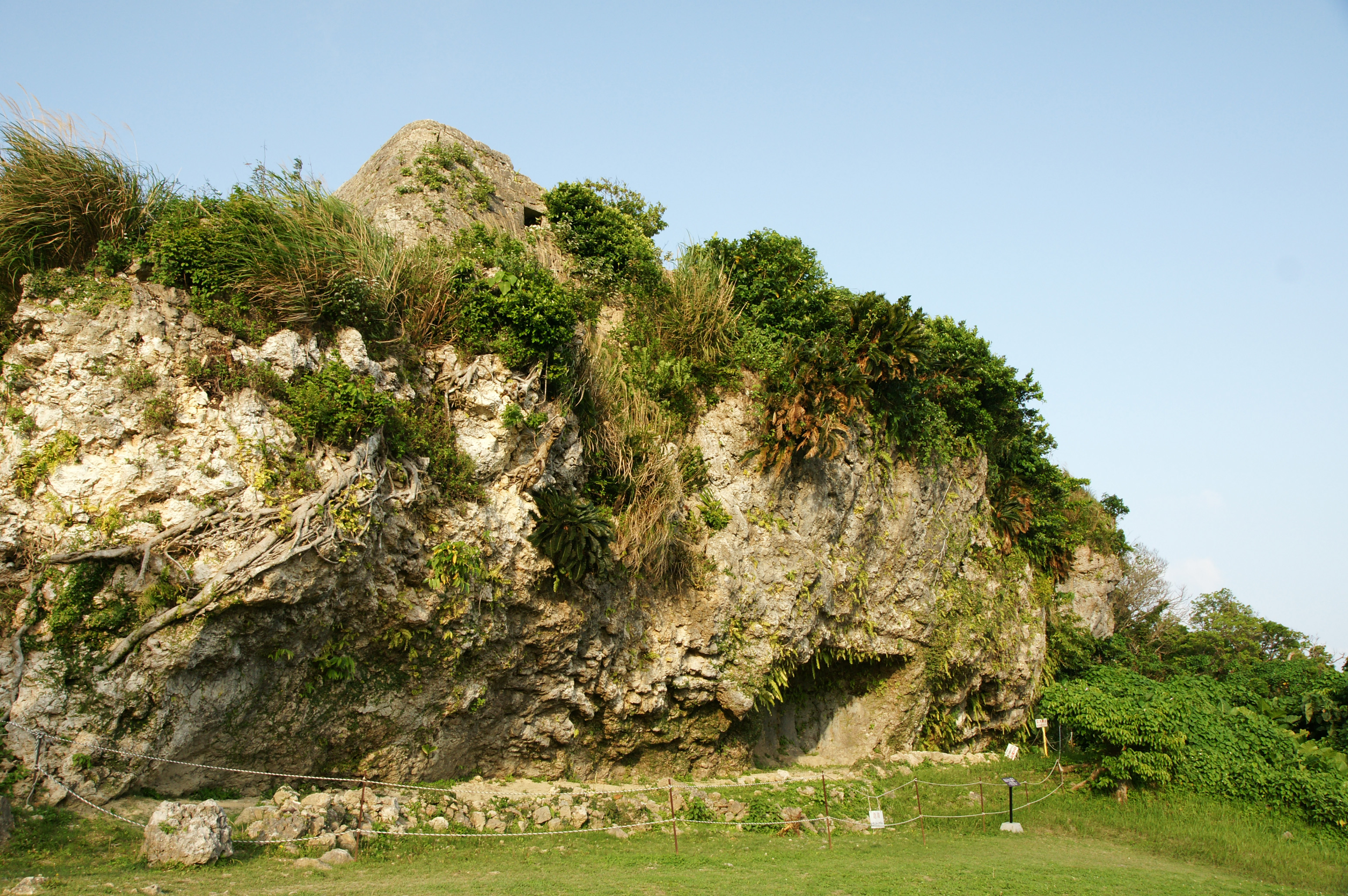

== See also ==
- List of Historic Sites of Japan (Okinawa)

== Literature ==
- Motoo, Hinago (1986). Japanese Castles. Tokyo: Kodansha. p. 200 pages. ISBN 0-87011-766-1.
