= Gosamaru =

15th-century Ryukyuan lord and leader

Gosamaru (護佐丸; Okinawan: Gusamaru; d. 1458) was a Ryukyuan Lord (Aji) of Yomitanzan and, later, Nakagusuku. He was also known as Seishun (盛春), and by the Chinese name Mao Guoding (毛國鼎, J: Mō Kokutei). He supported Shō Hashi, first king of the Ryukyu Kingdom, in his conquest of Hokuzan and unification of Okinawa Island. He committed suicide in 1458 during a battle with the Katsuren Aji, Amawari.

== Life ==
Gosamaru was born in Yamada Castle, in the village of Onna. He succeed his father as the Aji of Yomitanzan, and in 1416 he led the forces of Yomitanzan in support of Shō Hashi, king of the Okinawan kingdom of Chūzan, in his invasion and conquest of the neighboring kingdom of Hokuzan. Hashi would conquer the kingdom of Nanzan to the south several years later, uniting Okinawa Island, ending the Sanzan Period, and founding the unified Ryukyu Kingdom.

In recognition of his support, Gosamaru was made custodian of Hokuzan, and given Nakijin Castle, which had until then served as the royal seat of Hokuzan. Some time later, Gosamaru left Nakijin for Zakimi, where he built Zakimi Castle; it is said he mobilized workers from as far away as the Amami Islands for this project, and that stones were moved by hand from Yamada Castle to build the new castle.

For many years, Gosamaru served the kingdom loyally, and developed ties with the royal family, his daughter marrying King Shō Taikyū. Upon the wishes of the king, he oversaw the construction of Nakagusuku Castle and established himself there, serving to watch over another local lord, Amawari of Katsuren Castle, who had grown powerful and wealthy from maritime trade and who had his eye on the throne. In 1458, however, Amawari reported to the king that it was Gosamaru who was planning a revolt, and so the kingdom's forces, led by Amawari, assaulted Nakagusuku Castle. It is said that Gosamaru refused to fight back, out of loyalty to the kingdom, and killed himself rather than betray his loyalties and oppose his king. Amawari was executed soon afterwards, his duplicity having been discovered by a note to the king which Gosamaru placed in his mouth, knowing Amawari would bring his head to present to the king. An alternate theory claims that the entire affair was organized by the royal government, in order to remove both Gosamaru and Amawari as powerful rivals and potential threats to the succession.

== In popular culture ==
The tale of Gosamaru's betrayal and destruction by Amawari is among the more famous and popular of local historical legends. A Kumi odori (narrative dance-play) telling of Gosamaru's sons' quest for revenge against Amawari, was once performed as part of the kingdom's formal entertainment of Chinese investiture envoys to Ryukyu, and has in more recent times become popular again. Another version of events where Gosamaru plotted to take over the kingdom and was jealous of Amawari's growing power is presented in the play titled "Amawari."

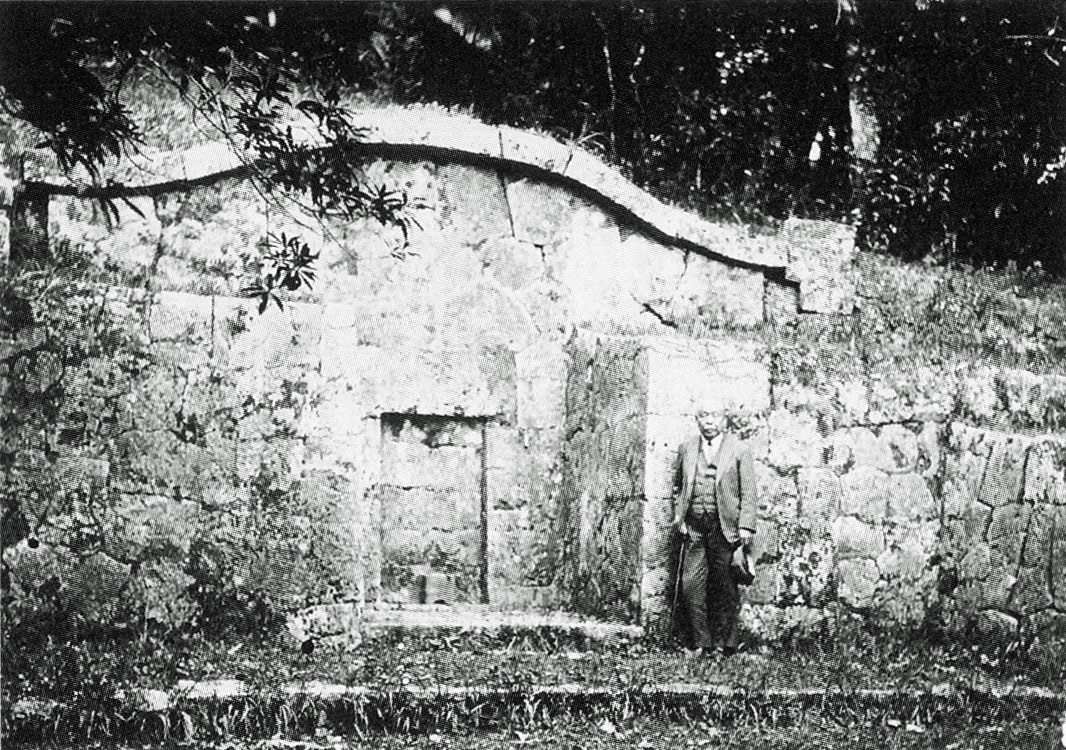
Tomb of Gosamaru.
