= Nakagusuku Hotel ruins =

Abandoned building in Kitanakagusuku, Okinawa, Japan

Coordinates: 26°16′58″N 127°47′53″E

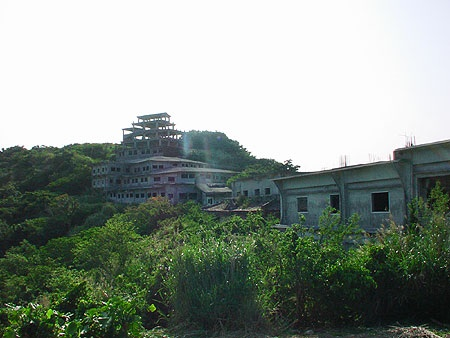
The ruins in 2014

The Nakagusuku Hotel site (中城ホテル跡, Nakagusuku Hoteru ato), also known as the Royal Hotel or Takahara or Kogen Hotel (高原ホテル, Takahara/Kōgen Hoteru), is an abandoned, unfinished hotel in Kitanakagusuku, Okinawa. It sits no more than 50 meters from the walls of Nakagusuku Castle. As of May 2020, the hotel has been fully demolished.

== Background ==
It is believed to have been built by a wealthy businessman from Naha in order to take advantage of the 1975 Okinawa Ocean Exposition. The hill directly South of Nakagusuku Castle was chosen as the construction site because of the view of both the Pacific Ocean and the East China Sea. The castle is listed as a UNESCO World Heritage Site. There were warnings given by monks from a nearby Buddhist temple that the site was home to numerous graves and sacred sites, but they were initially ignored. After many construction accidents, the workers refused to finish the complex as they felt that the place was cursed. It now sits empty and overgrown by vegetation.

== Name ==
The hotel's most common name in Japanese is written as 中城高原ホテル跡 (Nakagusuku Takahara/Kogen Hotel site). The name is less of a name and more of a description. 高原 can be pronounced as either Takahara or Kōgen, the latter meaning plateau. An alternative name, Royal Hotel, is the supposed name that the builder intended for it, and is evidenced by the faded word "Royal" painted above the entrance.
