= Katsuren Castle =

Ryukyuan castle in Uruma, Okinawa

Katsuren Castle 勝連城
- Uruma, Okinawa
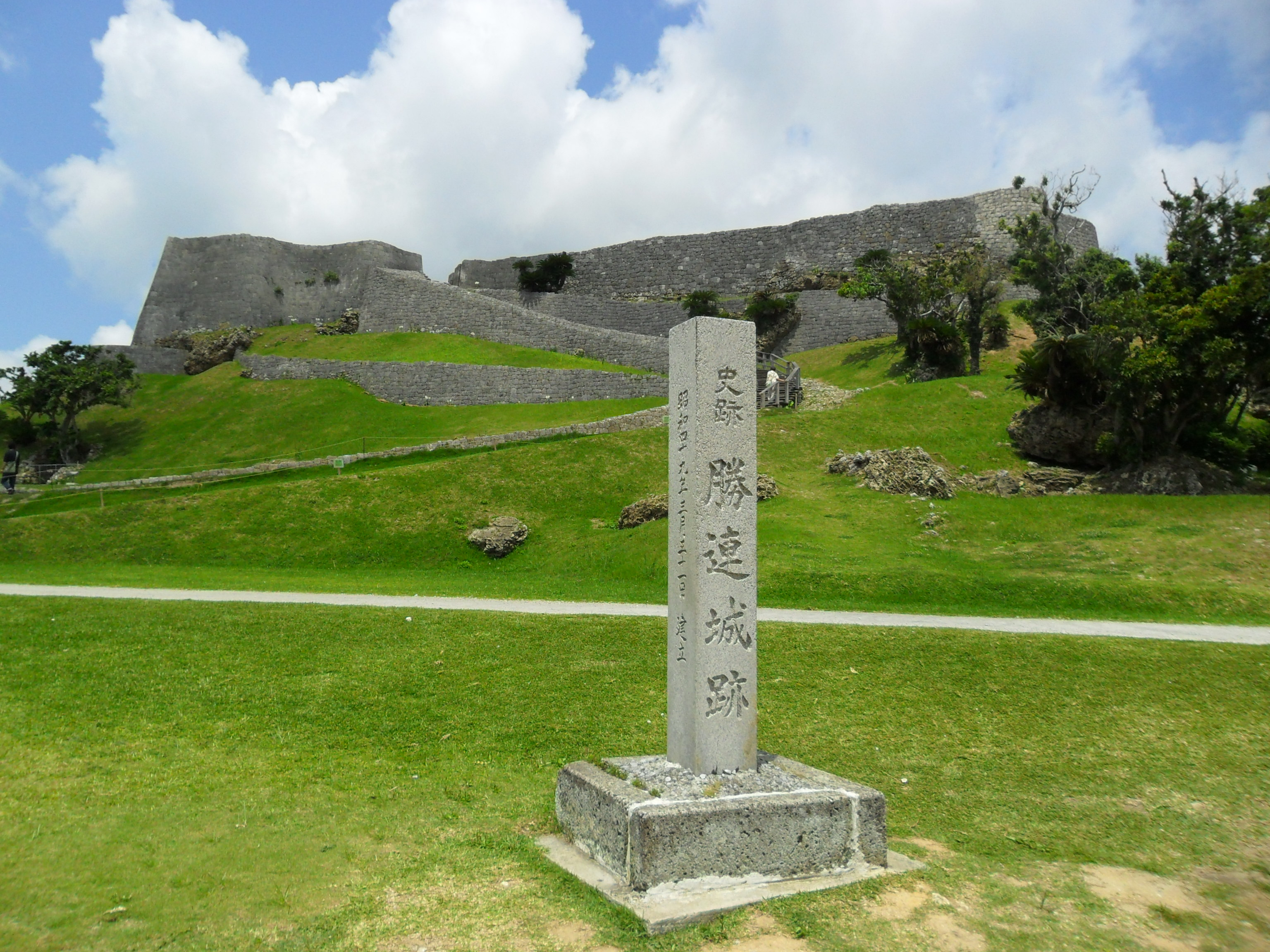
- Ruins of Katsuren Castle

Site information
- Type: Gusuku
- Open to the public: yes
- Condition: ruins
- Website: www.city.uruma.lg.jp/bunka/2399

Location
- Katsuren Castle
- Location within Okinawa Prefecture Location within Japan
- Coordinates: 26°19′48″N 127°52′43″E

Site history
- Built: 13th-14th century
- Built by: Aji of Katsuren Magiri
- In use: 13th century-1611
- Materials: Ryūkyūan limestone, wood
- Battles/wars: Attacked by Uni-Ufugusuku (1458)

Garrison information
- Occupants: Aji of Katsuren Magiri, Amawari

UNESCO World Heritage Site
- Criteria: Cultural: ii, iii, vi
- Reference: 972
- Inscription: 2000 (24th Session)
- National Historic Site of Japan

Katsuren Castle (勝連城, Katsuren jō; Okinawan: Kacchin Gusuku) is a Ryūkyūan gusuku fortification located in the city of Uruma, Okinawa Prefecture, Japan. It has been protected by the central government as a National Historic Site since 1972. In 2000, Katsuren Castle was designated as a UNESCO World Heritage Site, as a part of the Gusuku Sites and Related Properties of the Kingdom of Ryukyu.

== History ==
Katsuren Castle was built on a large hill of Ryūkyūan limestone, at an elevation of 60 to 100 meters above sea level at the southern base of the Katsuren Peninsula. With the Pacific Ocean on two sides, it is also called the "Ocean Gusuku". It consists of the southern castle (Hegusuku), the middle castle (Uchi), and the northern castle (Nishigusuku). The northern castle has three baileys (the first, second, and third baileys) separated by stone walls (baileys are also called kuruwa). The first, second, and third baileys are connected in a stepped pattern, with the first bailey being the highest. In the second bailey, the remains of a relatively large building, approximately 17 meters in front and 14.5 meters in depth, were discovered. It is believed to have been a shrine building with evenly spaced pillars and foundation stones. While roofs were primarily made of shingles when the castle was built, Japanese-style roof tiles have also been discovered nearby. The Haebaru settlement (Haebaru Furushima ruins) stretched to the south of the castle, serving as a port for trade.

Katsuren Castle was built in the early 14th century by Katsuren Aji, the fifth son of Taisei, the second king of the Eiso dynasty. Its "golden age" was in the mid-15th century, under Amawari, (the 10th Katsuren Aji). Amawari staged a coup against the 9th Katsuren Aji, Mochitsuke Aji, who was oppressive and an alcoholic. He then took over as Aji and promoted international trade, becoming increasingly powerful. After defeating Gosamaru in the Gosamaru-Amawari Rebellion, Amawari attempted to unify the Ryūkyū Islands, even overthrowing King Shō Taikyū, but was defeated by the royal court in 1458. The castle fell into ruins after that.

Chinese Yuan Dynasty ceramics (blue and white porcelain) have been excavated within the castle, and the prosperity of the time can be seen in the "Omoro Sōshi." Such remains testify to the magnificence of the ancient structure and the robust entrepôt trade between Japan, Korea, China, and Southeast Asia. Folklorist Yanagita Kunio wrote in his book "Omoro Saushi" that Katsuren was the cultural center of the time, and that there was a distinct "Katsuren culture" in contrast to the "Urasoe culture" centered around Urasoe, Shuri, and Naha.

The castle also has an active shrine of the Ryukyuan religion within the first bailey dedicated to Kobazukasa.

In the 2010 Okinawa earthquake an outer wall at the northeast of the third bailey of Katsuren Castle was damaged.

In 2016, both ancient Roman currency and medieval Ottoman currency were excavated there. This was the first time that Roman coins were excavated in Japan. The castle was listed as one of the Continued 100 Fine Castles of Japan by the Japanese Castle Foundation in 2017.

== Transportation ==
Katsuren Castle can be reached from the Naha Bus Terminal at Naha Airport via the Number 52 bus route, a ride of 1 hour and 20 minutes from the bus terminal. The castle is a five-minute walk from the Katsuren Danchimae (勝連団地前, Katsuren Danchi-mae) stop. The castle site can also be reached by the Okinawa Expressway via the Okinawa Minami IC.

== See also ==
- List of Historic Sites of Japan (Okinawa)
