= Aji (Ryukyu) =

Rank of nobility in the Ryukyu Islands

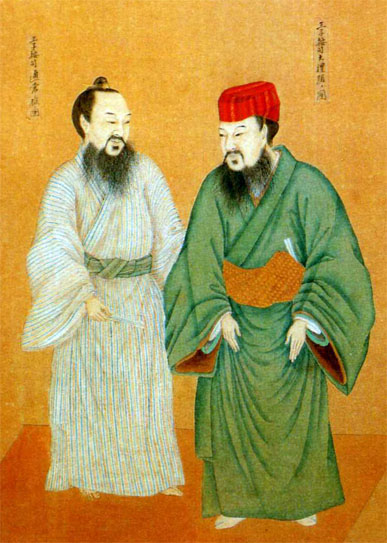
Aji

An aji, or anji (按司) was a ruler of a small kingdom in the history of the Ryukyu Islands. The word later became a title and rank of nobility in the Ryukyu Kingdom. It ranked next below a prince among nobility. The sons of princes and the eldest sons of aji became aji. An aji established a noble family equivalent to a Shinnōke of Japan.

The aji arose around the twelfth century as local leaders began to build Gusuku (Ryukyuan castles). Shō Hashi was an aji who later unified Okinawa Island as king. The title aji variously designated sons of the king and regional leaders. During the Second Shō Dynasty, when the aji settled near Shuri Castle, the word came to denote an aristocrat in the castle town.

A pattern for addressing a male aji began with the place he ruled and ended with the word aji, for example, "Nago Aji". For women, the suffix ganashi or kanashi (加那志) followed: "Nago Aji-ganashi".

== Etymology ==
The kanji used to spell this word, "按司", appears to be phono-semantic matching, consisting of the words "keep under control" + "official".

The Liuqiu Guan Yiyu (琉球館訳語), a Okinawan word list written in Chinese, states that "大唐大人 大刀那安只" ("[The] Tang nobility [are called] *taj.taw.na.an.tʂr̩"), while the Zhongsang Zhuanxinlu (中山伝信録) says "老爺 安主" ("[A] lord [is called] an.tʂy").

Konkōkenshū, a Okinawan word list written in Japanese, says "某のあんしきやなし 御太子御妃井御子様方御嫁部の御事" ("Some anjikyanashi [are the] great nobility of crown princes, the well of the imperical concubine, the ways of the great child, and parts of the great bride"). Various Old and Middle Okinawan anthologies variously spell it as あし, あじ, あち, あぢ, あんし, あんじ, and 按司.

Examples of the word in Ryukyuan languages include Amami Yamatohama [ʔadʑi], Okinawan Nakijin-Yonamine [ʔàdʑĭː], Okinawan Shuri [ʔádʑí ~ áɲdʑí], Miyako Irabu-Nakachi [azɨ].

Various etymologies have been proposed for this word. For instance, Iha Fuyu had suggested that this word has been derived from the Japanese word aruji "master".

== List of Aji to 1873 ==
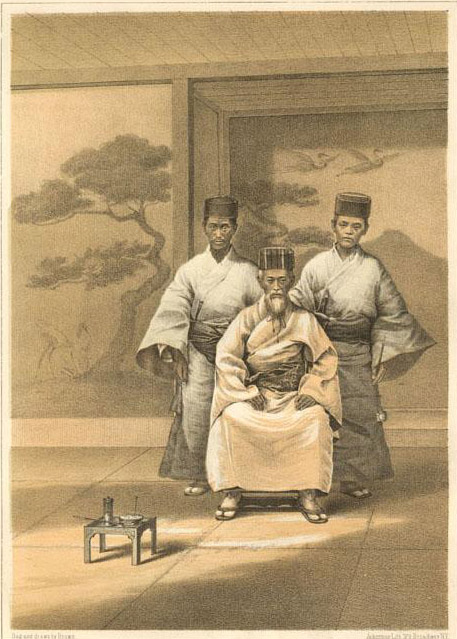
Shō Kōkun, also known as Nakazato Aji Chōki (later Yonagusuku Ōji Chōki), the 9th head of Yonagusuku Udun

- Oroku Aji (Oroku Udun)
- Yuntanza Aji (Yuntanza Udun)
- Yoshimura Aji (Yoshimura Udun)
- Yonagusuku Aji (Yonagusuku Udun)
- Tomigusuku Aji (Tomigusuku Udun)
- Osato Aji (Osato Udun)
- Urasoe Aji (Urasoe Udun)
- Tamagawa Aji (Tamagawa Udun)
- Kunigami Aji (Kunigami Udun)
- Omura Aji (Omura Udun)
- Motobu Aji (Motobu Udun)
- Misato Aji (Misato Udun)
- Haneji Aji (Haneji Udun)
- Nago Aji (Nago Udun)
- Kin Aji (Kin Udun)
- Uchima Aji (Uchima Udun)
- Mabuni Aji (Mabuni Udun)
- Nakazato Aji (Nakazato Udun)
- Goeku Aji (Goeku Udun)
- Ogimi Aji (Ogimi Udun)
- Gushikami Aji (Gushikami Udun)
- Mabuni Aji (Mabuni Udun)
- Tamashiro Aji (Tamashiro Udun)
- Gushikawa Aji (Gushikawa Udun)
- Takamine Aji (Takamine Udun)
- Kushi Aji (Kushi Udun)
- Katsuren Aji (Katsuren Udun)

== See also ==
- Kumemura

== Works cited ==
- Higashionna, Kanjun. (1957). Ryukyu no rekishi, Tokyo: Shibundo.
- Higashionna, Kanjun. (1964). Nanto fudoki, Tokyo: Okinawa Bunka Kyokai Okinawa Zaidan.
- Hokama, Shūzen (1995). 沖縄古語大辞典 [Dictionary of Archaic Okinawan]. Tokyo: Kadokawa Shoten.
- Kokuritsu Kokugo Kenkyūjo (1963). 沖縄語辞典 [Okinawan Dictionary]. Tokyo: Ōkurashō Insatsu Kyoku.
- Nakasone, Seizen (1983). 沖縄今帰仁方言辞典 [Okinawa Nakjiin Dialect Dictionary]. Tokyo: Kadokawa Shoten.
- Osada, Suma; Suyama, Nahoko (1977–1980). 奄美方言分類辞典 [Thematic Dictionary of Amami Dialect]. Tokyo: Kasama Shoin.
- Pulleybank, Edwin G. (1995). Lexicon of Reconstructed Pronunciation in Early Middle Chinese, Late Middle Chinese, and Early Mandarin. Vancouver: UBC Press.
- Tomihama, Sadayoshi (2013). 宮古伊良部方言辞典 [Miyako Irabu Dialect Dictionary]. Naha: Okinawa Times.
