= Shureimon =

Gate in Naha, Okinawa

Coordinates: 26°13′05.3″N 127°43′00.8″E

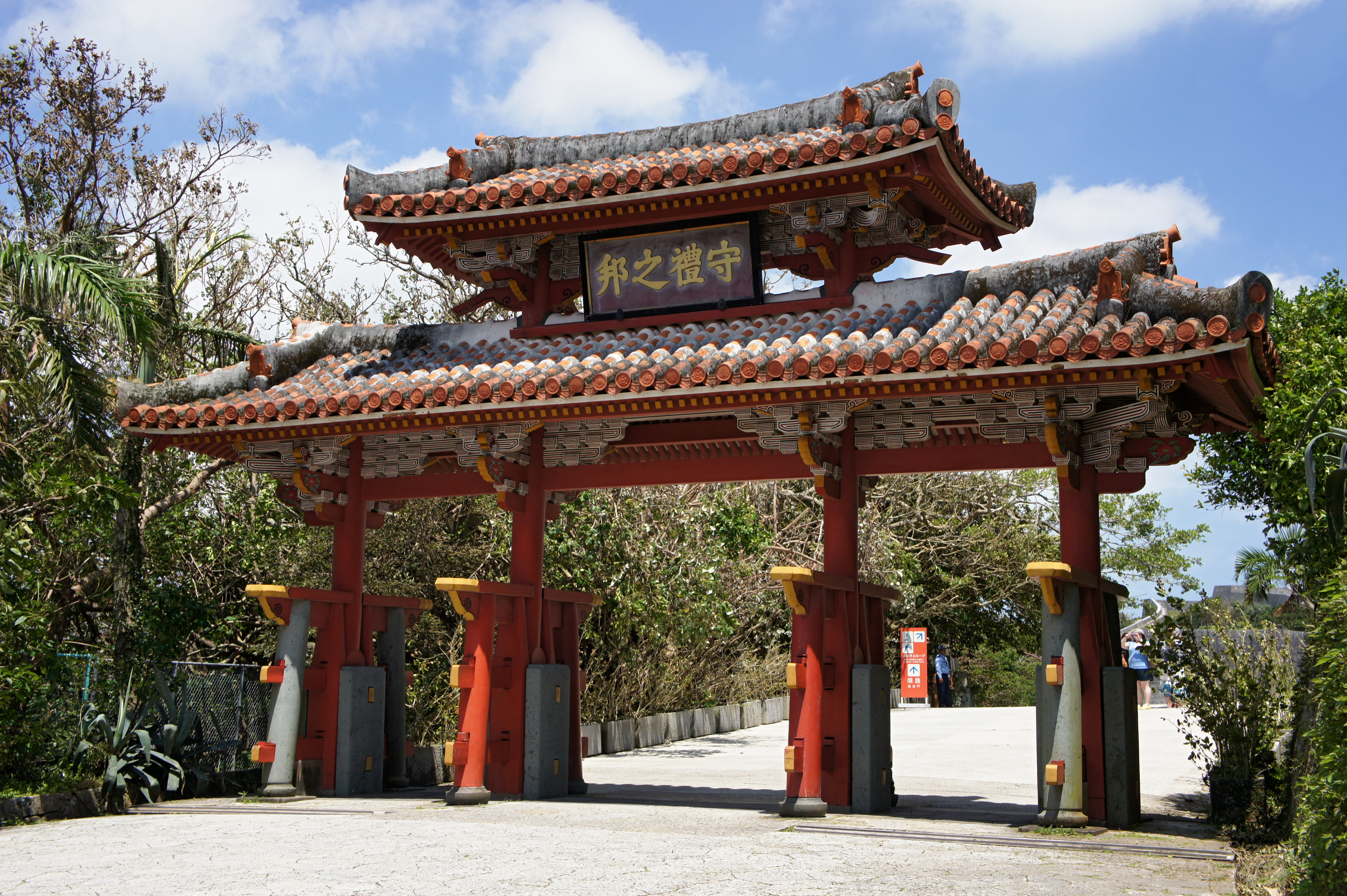
Shureimon or Shurei no mon

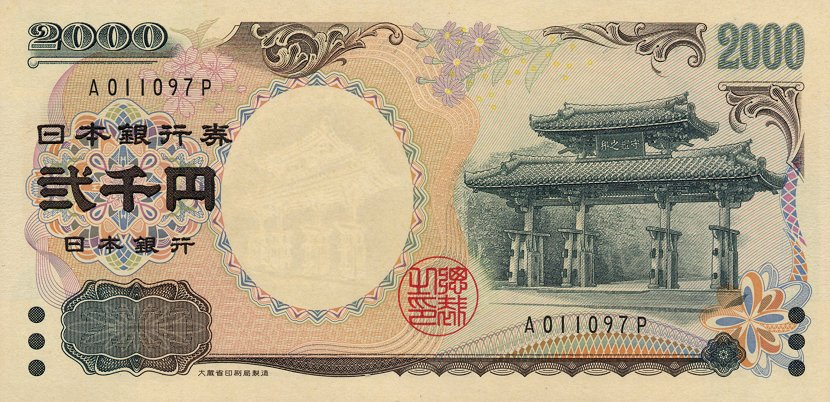
Shureimon as depicted on the 2000 yen note

Map

Shureimon (守礼門, Okinawan: Uī-nu-turi, Uī-nu-Ayajō) is a gate in the Shuri neighborhood of Naha, the capital of Okinawa Prefecture, Japan. It was the second of Shuri Castle's main gates. Now it is the main gate to the castle complex. Chūzanmon was the first ceremonial gate to Shurijo, built around 1427 by King Shō Hashi, and it was demolished in 1907.

== Construction ==
It was first built in the 16th century, and the structure of the gate is similar to that of Chinese three-bay turret gates, and is covered with a red tiled hip roof. The four Hanzi framed on the gate - Shu, rei, no, and kuni, which mean 'Land of Propriety', were added to the gate long after it was built. It was also called Shurimon (首里門; "Shuri gate") and Wī nu Aijō (上ぬ綾門; "Beautiful gate at the upper part") in Okinawan. The gate reflects strong Chinese influence, alongside indigenous religious traditions.

== Reconstruction ==
The gate was destroyed in 1945 during the Battle of Okinawa and reconstructed through local campaigns and support in the 1950s and 1960s. It became the first part of the Shuri Castle to be reconstructed, while decades would follow until the rest of the castle was restored. The main columns are 7.94 meters apart. The top layer of the gate is 7.05 meters high, and the lower layer 5.11 meters. The four pillars stand on foundation stones, and they are supported on front and back by slanting accessory pillars for better stability. A picture of the reconstructed gate appears on the 2000 yen note issued in 2000 to commemorate the 26th G8 summit held in Okinawa.
