= 2000 yen note =

Rarely circulated denomination of Japanese yen

¥2,000
- Country: Japan
- Value: 2,000 Yen
- Width: 154 mm
- Height: 76 mm
- Security features: Color-shifting ink, intaglio printing, latent imaging, luminescent ink, microprinting, pearl ink, tactile printing, watermark, EURion constellation

Obverse
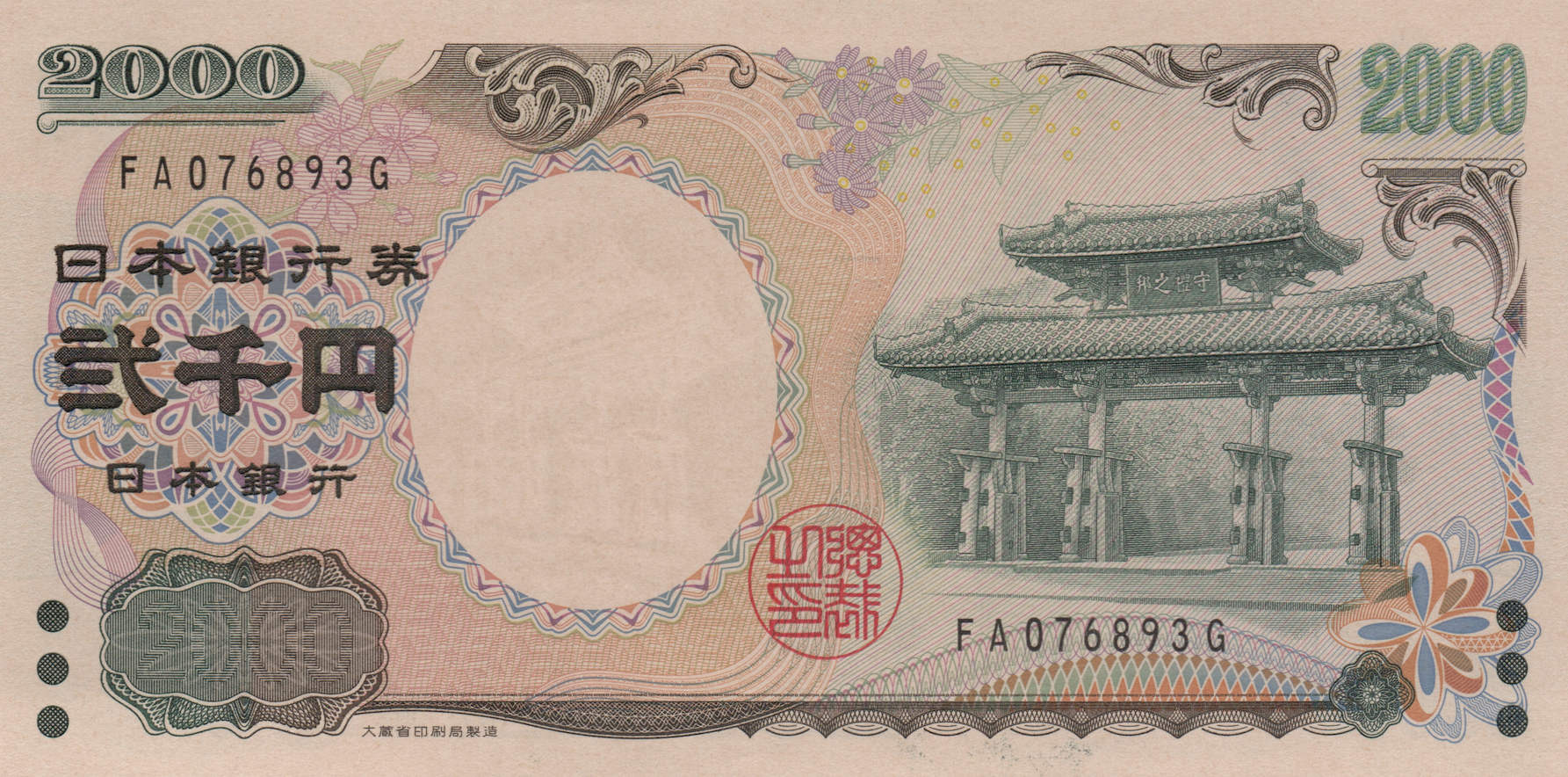
- Design: Shureimon

Reverse
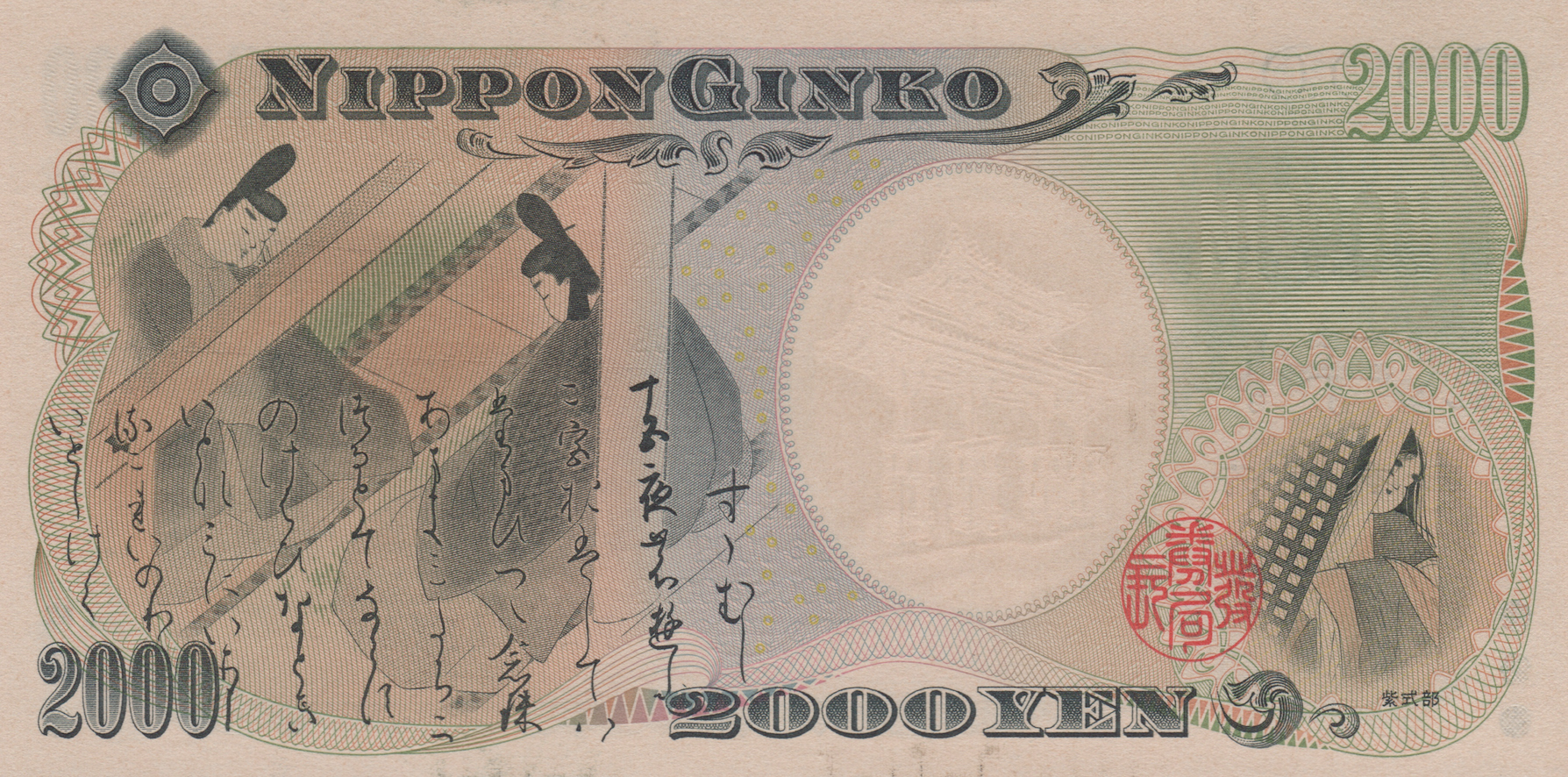
- Design: The Tale of Genji and Lady Murasaki

The ¥2,000 note (二千円紙幣, nisen-en shihei) is a denomination of Japanese yen, that was first issued on July 19, 2000, to commemorate the 26th G8 Summit and the millennium. The banknote is notable for not being a commemorative banknote under Japanese law, and circulates as a regular issue. It is also currently the only unit of circulating Japanese currency that uses a denomination that begins with 2.

Many vending machines and ATMs were not configured to accept or dispense this denomination, leading to inconvenience for customers trying to use them. Public perception has also played a role in this denomination's lack of use, as the note was often viewed as unnecessary or cumbersome compared to more commonly used denominations.

== History ==
As of 2010, approximately 110 million ¥2,000 notes were in circulation, accounting for about 1% of all Japanese currency. The Bank of Japan ceased printing new ¥2,000 notes in 2004, leading to a gradual decline in their numbers over time. Factors contributing to their rarity include limited acceptance by vending machines and ATMs, as well as public perception of the denomination as inconvenient. Despite this, the ¥2,000 note remains popular in Okinawa, where the Shureimon gate depicted on the note is located. Local businesses and banks in Okinawa have actively promoted its use, with some ATMs specifically dispensing ¥2,000 notes.

The design is similar to that of the other Japanese notes in circulation at the time of issue. The obverse has a serial number and depicts Shureimon, a 16th-century gate at Shuri Castle in Naha, in Okinawa Prefecture, Japan. Cherry blossom and chrysanthemum motifs are part of the linear design work in the background. The reverse side depicts a scene from The Tale of Genji, and a portrait of Murasaki Shikibu, the noblewoman to whom this work of classic literature has been attributed. A copy of a portion of script from the original work is included.

== Rarity ==
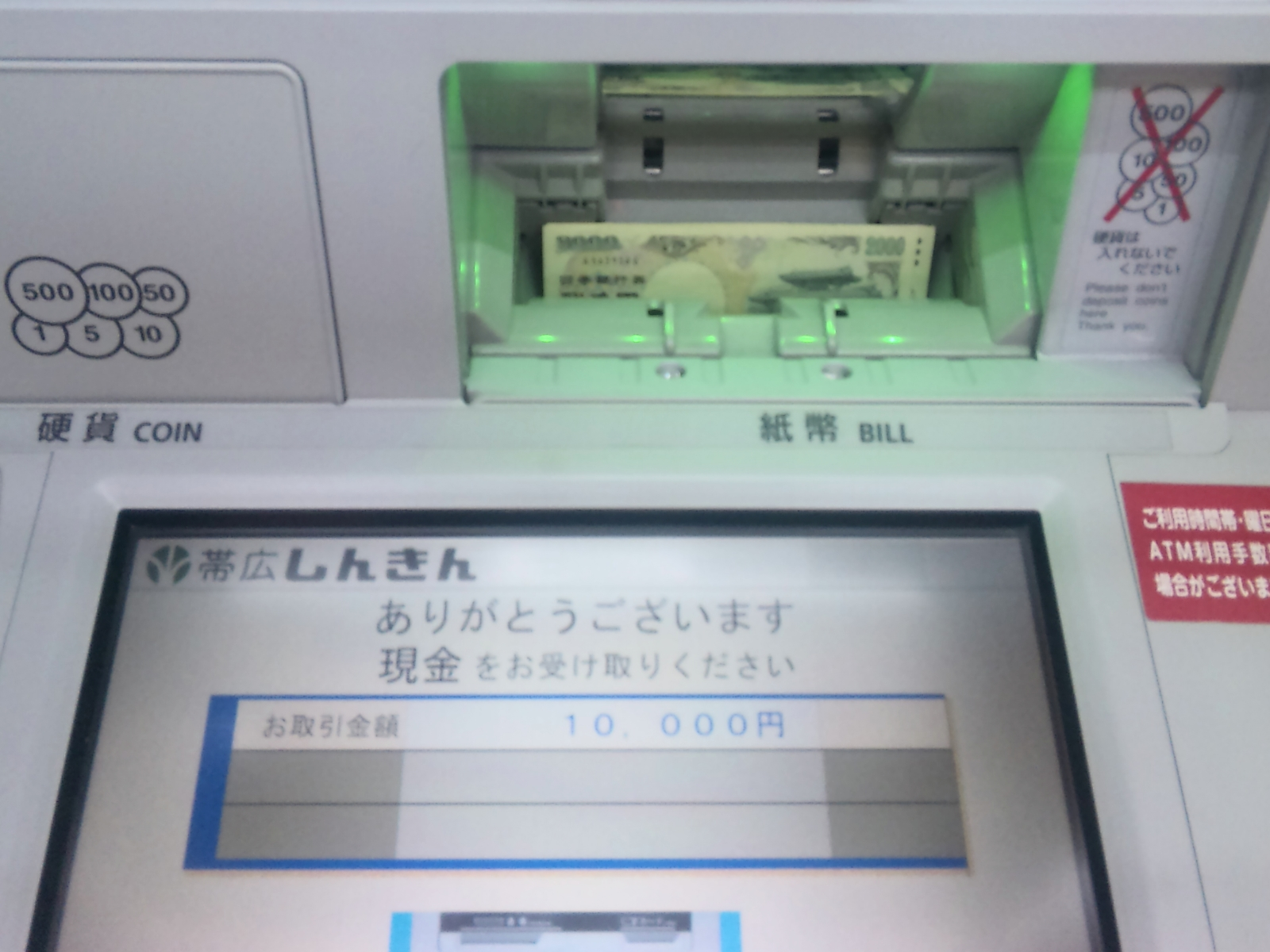
An ATM in Japan dispensing ¥10,000 in five ¥2,000 notes

The rarity of ¥2,000 notes in circulation is linked to the few vending machines or ATMs that accept the denomination. Overall public opinion has been negative, as the denomination is inconvenient to use, and is a nuisance to cashiers and business owners that use registers with no slot for the bills. The Bank of Japan has also weighed in by giving factors such as the debut of Series E 2004-dated notes that entered into circulation. A spokesperson for the bank later stated in 2006 that "I think people prefer to hold on to the newer bank notes" when referring to Series E in comparison. The Bank of Japan stopped producing ¥2,000 notes in 2004 when there were 513 million of them in circulation. This figure dropped to 111 million by 2010 when it was recorded that ¥2,000 notes made up just around 0.9% of all notes in circulation.

It was reported in 2019 that the Bank of Japan is not printing new ¥2,000 notes, as large amounts of them are currently held in the bank's reserve. The note is popular and circulates more in Okinawa than it does on the Japanese main islands; some ATMs in Okinawa allow users to specifically withdraw ¥2,000 notes in addition to other denominations. The notes often trade above their face value on online sales.

== See also ==
- Banknotes of the Japanese yen
- United States two-dollar bill – another banknote denomination similarly rarely seen in circulation
