= Sakishima Beacons =

17th-century Okinawan observatory platforms

- 先島諸島火番盛 (Japanese)
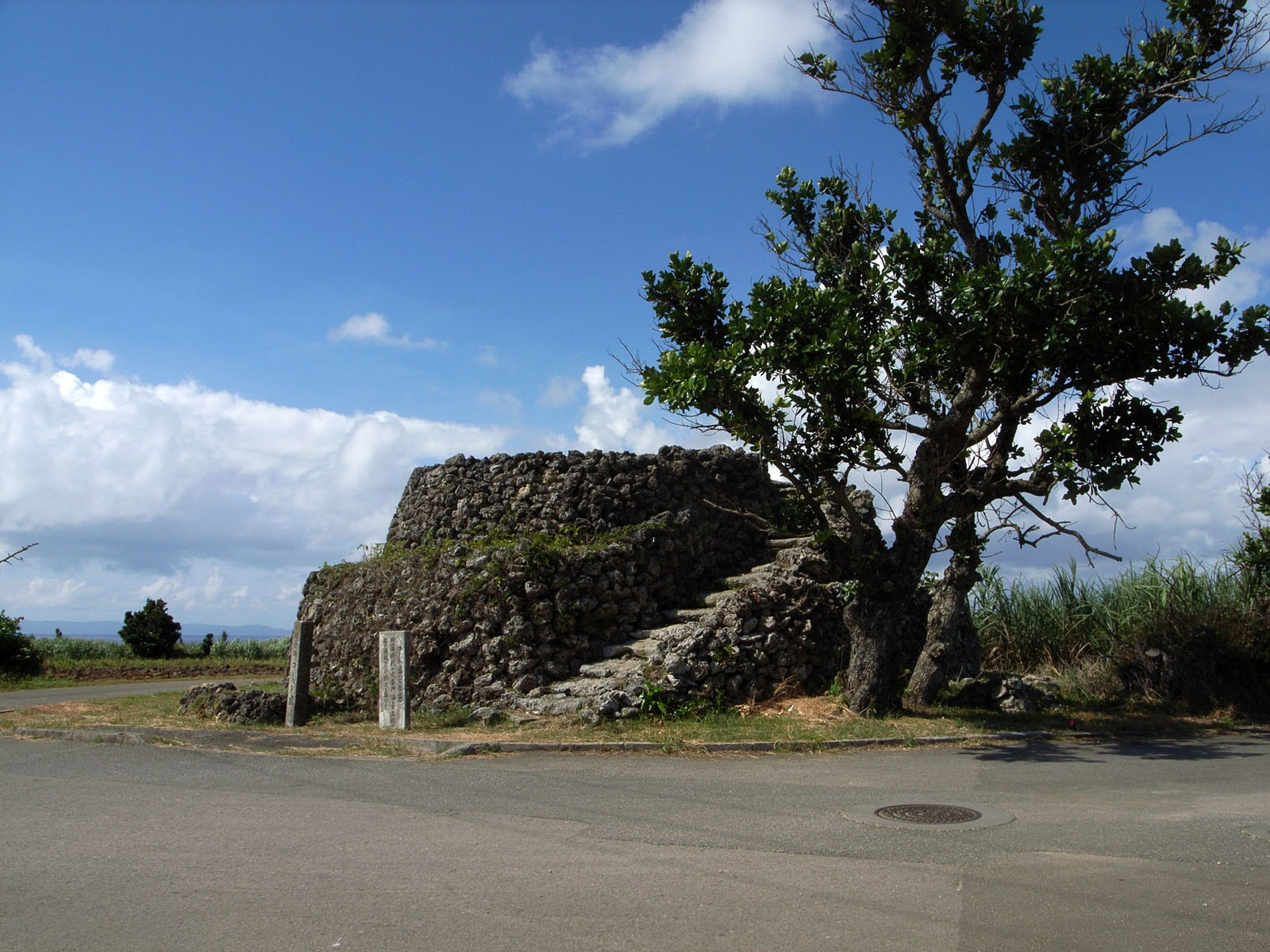
- Kōtomui beacon on Hateruma
- Location: Miyako Islands, Yaeyama Islands Japan
- Region: Okinawa

Site notes
- Public access: Yes

The Sakishima Beacons (Japanese: 先島諸島火番盛, Hepburn: Sakishima-shotō hibanmui; Yaeyama: Piːbammurï) are a network of eighteen observation platforms and beacons on thirteen islands dating to the early Edo period and located in the Sakishima Islands, Okinawa Prefecture, Japan. Erected in 1644 by the Ryūkyū Kingdom at the instigation of their Satsuma overlords, at a time of international tension during the transition between the Ming and the Qing Dynasties of China, the beacons were responsible for monitoring and reporting on maritime traffic. After an initial survey by the Council for the Protection of Cultural Properties in 1993, due to uncertainties over land rights and difficulties of coordination between the involved municipalities, it was not until 2007 that they were jointly designated an National Historic Site.

== History ==
Lookout posts were originally established in Nagasaki Port in 1638 to monitor foreign ships, against the backdrop of the Tokugawa Shogunate's policy of national isolation. Geographically, the Sakishima Islands are closest to China. Around 1644, 18 lookout posts were established at the request of the Satsuma Domain, which had the Ryūkyū Kingdom as a vassal state. These posts are known as hibanmui in the Sakishima Islands because they were used to light signal fires for surveillance. The hibanmui monitored the progress of tribute ships from the Ryūkyū Kingdom to China and the arrival of foreign ships, and signal fires were sent to the various hibanmui posts, which then notified the Ryūkyū Kingdom authorities in Shuri.

== Locations ==
There are eight beacons in the Miyako Islands and ten in the Yaeyama Islands. Of those in the Miyako Islands, five are within the city of Miyakojima (on the islands of Miyakojima, Ikema, and Kurima), and three in the village of Tarama (on the islands of Tarama and Minna). Of those in the Yaeyama Islands, two are within the city of Ishigaki (on the island of Ishigaki), seven in the town of Taketomi (on the islands of Taketomi, Kuroshima, Upper and Lower Aragusuku, Hateruma, Kohamajima, and Hatoma), and one in the town of Yonaguni (on the island of Yonaguni).

== Operations ==
Records suggest that the beacon near Cape Hirakubo on Ishigaki was at one point manned by a team of four, who also slept on the site. A different signal may have been given depending upon the origin of the ships. A restaged beacon relay in November 2007 saw an attempt to pass signals along two routes: (1) Hateruma-Aragusuku (Shimoji)-Aragusuku (Kamiji)-Kuroshima-Taketomi-Ishigaki; and (2) Hatoma-Kohamajima-Taketomi-Ishigaki. Along both routes the initial signal could not be seen from the next observation platform, due to rain; after restarting from the second station, both signals were successfully relayed to Ishigaki; in some instances it took up to ten minutes from the signal being observed for a fire to be lit sufficient for the smoke to be seen at the next station; the exercise highlighted the difficulty in transmitting signals by such a method in times of inclement weather and poor visibility.

== List of beacons ==
Beacon	Island	Municipality	Comments	Image	Coordinates
Ikema tōmi 池間遠見	Ikema Island	Miyakojima	located on a small hill at the southern tip of the island		24°55′20″N 125°14′52″E
Karimata tōmi 狩俣遠見	Miyakojima Island	Miyakojima	on a hill behind Karimata		24°53′47″N 125°16′40″E
Shimajiri tōmi 島尻遠見	Miyakojima Island	Miyakojima	on a hill in northeast Shimajiri		24°52′35″N 125°17′52″E
Sunagawa tōmi 砂川遠見	Miyakojima Island	Miyakojima	at the south end of Hiokuyama in Sunagawa		24°43′31″N 125°21′07″E
Kurima tōmi 来間遠見	Kurima Island	Miyakojima	three-metre tower of Ryūkyū limestone (琉球石灰岩) reinforced by the Japanese army during the Pacific War		24°43′33″N 125°15′08″E
Miyako tōmi 宮古遠見	Tarama Island	Tarama			24°40′26″N 124°42′12″E
Yaeyama tōmi 八重山遠見	Tarama Island	Tarama			24°40′19″N 124°41′46″E
Minna tōmi 水納遠見	Minna Island	Tarama			24°45′09″N 124°42′15″E
Hirakubo tōmi-dai 平久保遠見台	Ishigaki Island	Ishigaki	just to the south of Cape Hirakubo on the Hirakubo Peninsula (平久保半島)		24°36′35″N 124°18′58″E
Kabira hibanmui 川平火番盛	Ishigaki Island	Ishigaki	near the Kabira Shell Mound (Historic Site) to the northwest of Kabira Bay		24°28′06″N 124°07′57″E
Kogukusu mui 小城盛 (クスクムイ)	Taketomi Island	Taketomi	also known as Kusuku mui		24°19′57″N 124°05′10″E
Puzumari プズマリ	Kuroshima Island	Taketomi			24°14′13″N 123°59′40″E
Takaniku タカニク	Aragusuku Islands (Kamiji)	Taketomi			24°14′15″N 123°56′36″E
Nakamori 中森 (波照間ムリ)	Aragusuku Islands (Shimoji)	Taketomi	also known as Hateruma muri		24°12′56″N 123°55′40″E
Kōto mui コート盛	Hateruma Island	Taketomi			24°03′51″N 123°46′27″E
Ufu-daki 大岳	Kohamajima Island	Taketomi	the hill rises to 99 m above sea level and is a Municipal Place of Scenic Beauty		24°20′47″N 123°58′44″E
Nakamori 中森	Hatoma Island	Taketomi	the small forest is a Municipal Natural Monument		24°28′16″N 123°49′12″E
Datiguchidi ダティグチディ	Yonaguni Island	Yonaguni	near Cape Agarizaki (東崎) at the eastern end of the island		24°27′45″N 123°01′54″E

== See also ==
- Dejima
- List of Historic Sites of Japan (Okinawa)
