= Yaeyama District, Okinawa =

District in Okinawa prefecture, Japan

Coordinates: 24°16′28″N 123°51′58″E

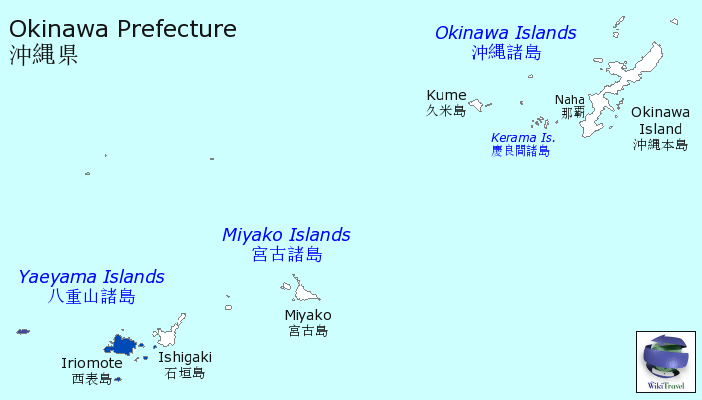
Map of the Yaeyama District (in blue) in Okinawa Prefecture

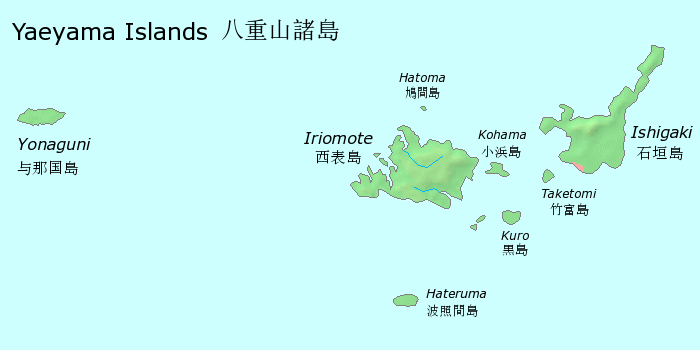
Map of the Yaeyama Islands

Yaeyama (八重山郡, Yaeyama-gun; Yaeyama: Yaima, Yonaguni: Daama, Okinawan: Yeema) is a district located in Okinawa Prefecture, Japan. The district covers all of the Yaeyama Islands except Ishigaki and the disputed Senkaku Islands.

As of 2003, the district has an estimated population of 5,579 and the density of 15.37 persons per km^{2}. The total area is 362.89 kilometers^{2}.

== Islands ==
	Island	Town	Population	Area
1	Iriomote	Taketomi	2,253	289.2
2	Yonaguni	Yonaguni	1,676	28.9
3	Kohama	Taketomi	621	7.8
4	Hateruma	Taketomi	470	12.7
5	Taketomi	Taketomi	341	5.4
6	Kuroshima	Taketomi	193	10
7	Hatoma	Taketomi	54	0.9
8	Aragusuku	Taketomi	10	3.3

== Towns and villages ==
- Taketomi
- Yonaguni

== Transportation ==
Two airports, Hateruma Airport on Hateruma island in Taketomi and Yonaguni Airport in Yonaguni serve the district.
