= Yubu Island =

Island within Ryukyu Islands

Native name: Yubu-jima (由布島)
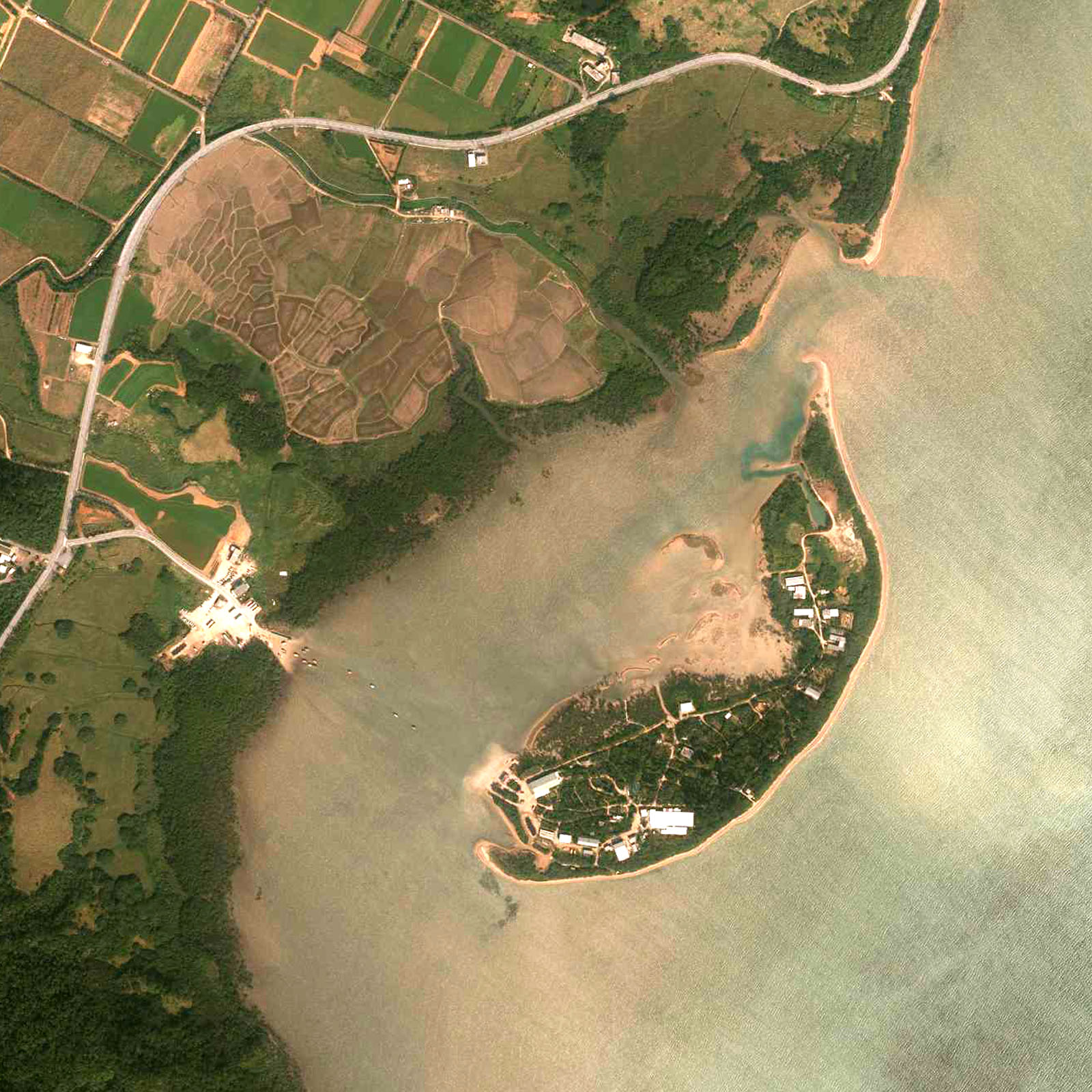
- Yubu Island (right) next to Iriomote Island (left), 2012
- Interactive map of Yubu Island

Geography
- Location: Pacific Ocean
- Coordinates: 24°20′42″N 123°56′06″E
- Archipelago: Yaeyama Islands
- Area: 0.15 km^{2} (0.058 sq mi)
- Highest elevation: 1.9 m (6.2 ft)

Administration
- Japan
- Prefecture: Okinawa Prefecture
- Town: Taketomi, Okinawa

Yubu Island (由布島, Yubu-jima; Yaeyama:Jubu) is an island of the Yaeyama Islands of Japan, it is located about 0.5 miles east of Iriomote Island. The "Subtropical Botanical Garden" encompasses most of the island.

== Geography and transport ==
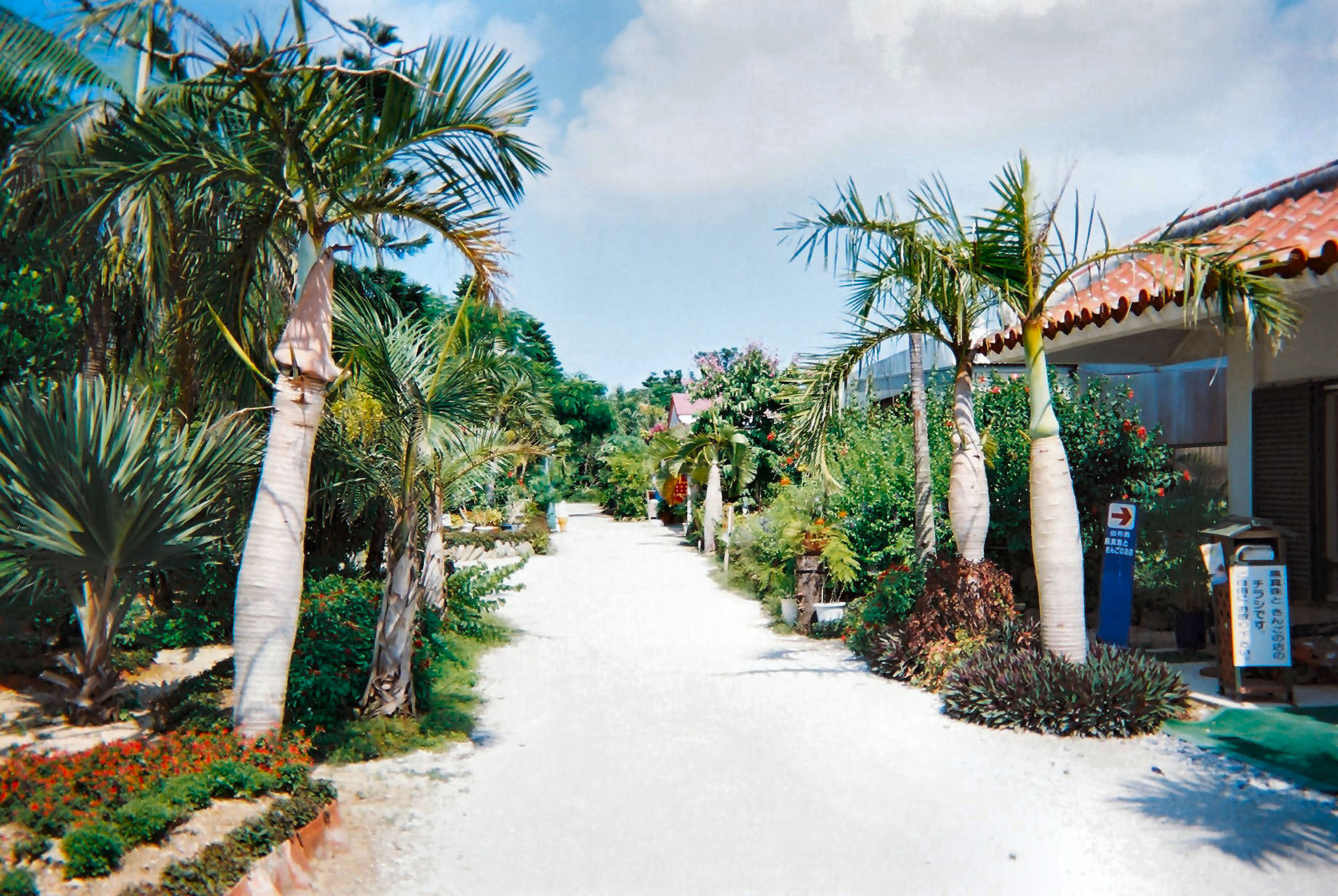
Street view of Yubu Island

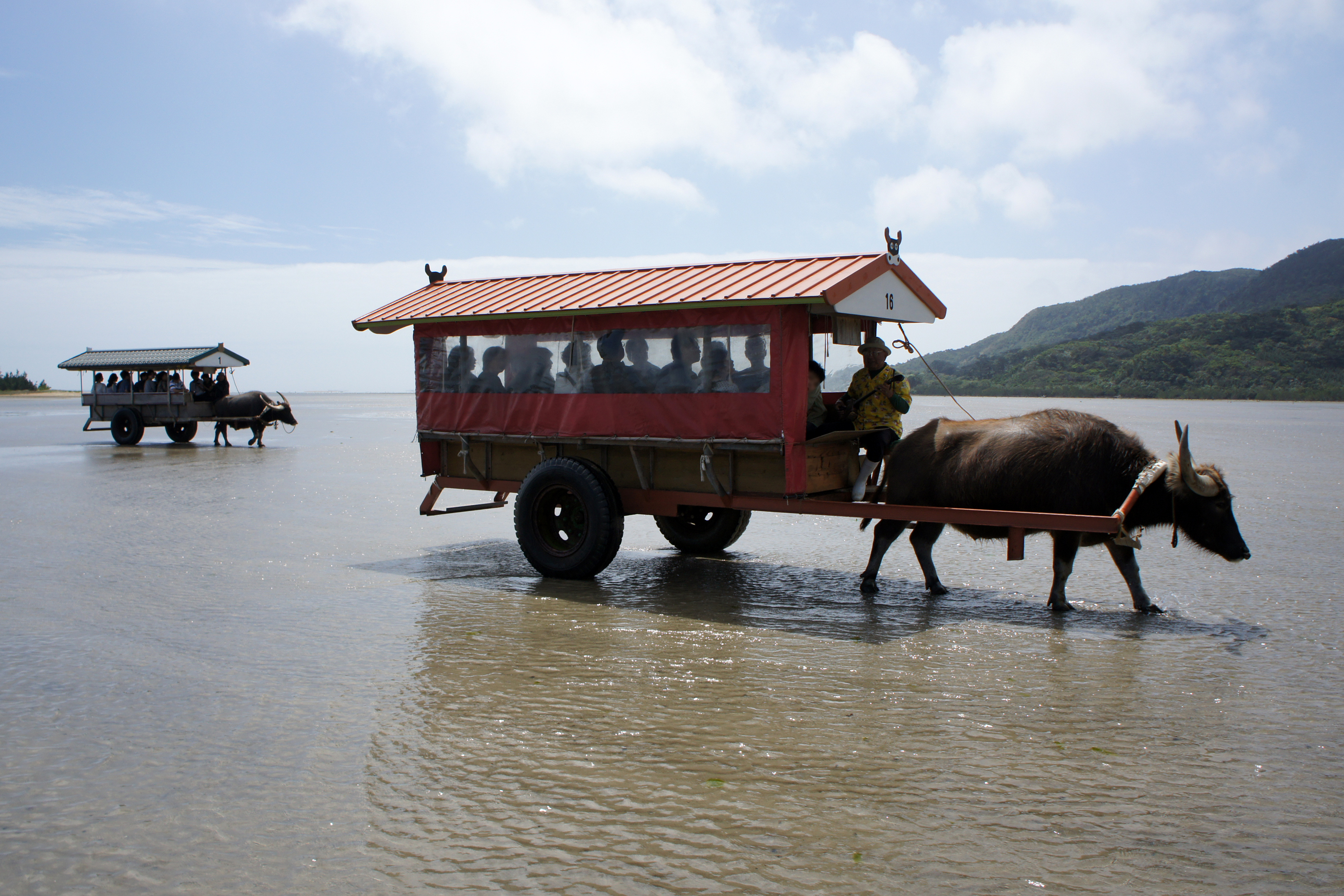
Water buffalo carts carrying people between Iriomote Island and Yubu Island

Yubu Island is a small island with a total area of 0.15 km^{2} and a circumference of 2.0 km. It is located 0.5 km east of Iriomote Island. The water level between Yubu Island and Iriomote Island is usually no more than around knee deep, even during high tide the maximum depth is around 1 meter. Water buffalo carts are used as a means of transportation between Yubu Island and Iriomote Island, and have become an important tourist attraction for the island. When it is low tide and the waves are calm, it is possible to cross between islands on foot. Utility poles are built in the sea from Iriomote Island to Yubu Island in order to guide foot traffic. A botanical garden encompasses most of the island.

== History ==
After the Pacific War, in 1947, people who migrated from Taketomi Island and Kuroshima Island to Iriomote Island, established a settlement on Yubu Island. Fruit trees and sugar canes were cultivated, and water buffaloes were raised.

On September 26, 1969, Typhoon Elsie struck Yubu Island and most of the island's inhabitants moved to Iriomote soon after.

On April 1, 1981, the "Subtropical Botanical Garden" was opened on the island. The garden has gradually expanded over time to encompass most of the island. The island is a popular tourist attraction to visitors of Iriomote because of its botanical garden and water buffalo cart rides. In 2017, approximately 201,600 tourist visited Yubu, with a peak day of 1,117.
