= Taketomi, Okinawa =

Taketomi 竹富町 Teedun
- Town
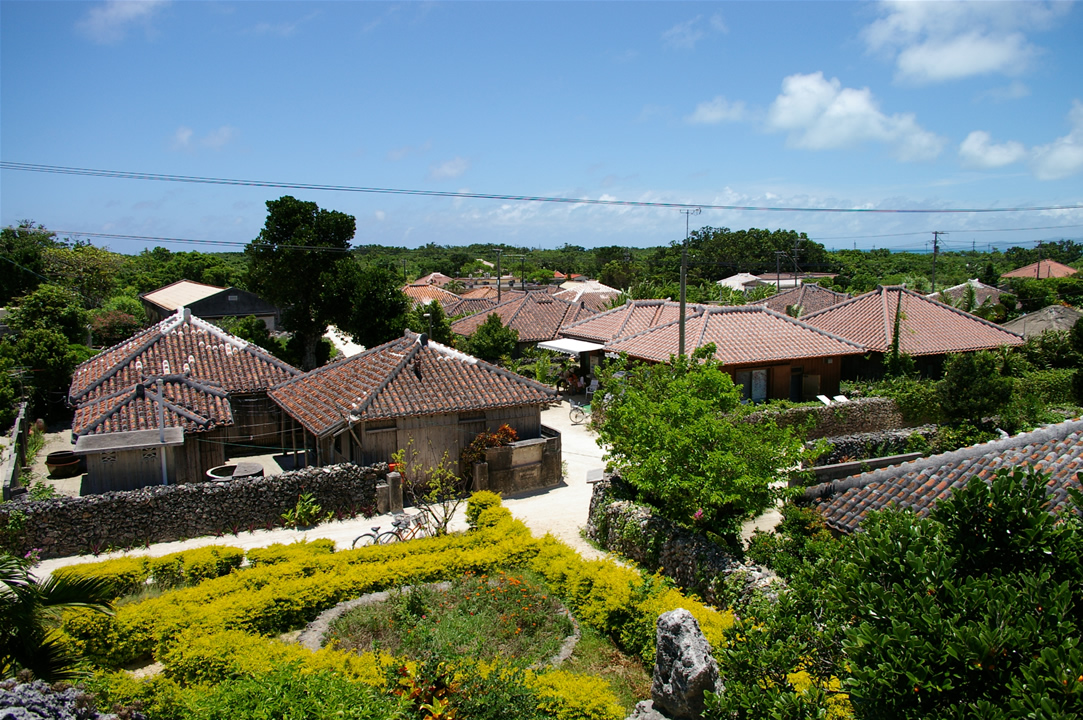
- Traditional houses in Taketomi

- Flag Emblem

- Location of Taketomi in Okinawa Prefecture

- Location in Japan
- Coordinates: 24°17′12″N 123°52′54″E
- Country: Japan
- Region: Kyushu (Okinawa)
- Prefecture: Okinawa Prefecture
- District: Yaeyama

Government
  - Mayor: Takeshi Ōmori

Area
  - Total: 334.02 km^{2} (128.97 sq mi)

Population (October 2016)
  - Total: 4,050
  - Density: 12.1/km^{2} (31.4/sq mi)
- Time zone: UTC+09:00 (JST)
- City hall address: 11 Misakichō, Ishigaki-shi, Okinawa-ken; 907-8503
- Website: www.town.taketomi.lg.jp (in Japanese)
- Symbols
- Bird: Ruddy kingfisher
- Butterfly: Great orange tip
- Fish: Bluefin trevally
- Flower: Light galangal
- Tree: Inumaki

Taketomi (Japanese: 竹富町, Hepburn: Taketomi-chō; Yaeyama: Teedun; Okinawan: Dakidun) is a town located in Yaeyama District, Okinawa Prefecture, Japan.

The town includes all of the islands in the Yaeyama Islands excluding Ishigaki, Yonaguni, and the Senkaku Islands. This includes the islands of Iriomote, Yubu, Taketomi, Kohama, Kuroshima, Hateruma, and Hatoma. Although Ishigaki is not part of the town of Taketomi, the town hall is located there.

As of October 2016, the town has an estimated population of 4,050 and the population density of 12 inhabitants per square kilometre (31/sq mi). The total area is 334.02 square kilometres (128.97 sq mi).

== Geography ==
The town includes the inhabited islands of Iriomote, Taketomi, Kohama, Kuro, Hateruma, Hatoma, Aragusuku (comprising the islands of Kamiji and Shimoji) Kayama and Yubu and the surrounding desert islands such as Sotobanari or Nakanokami.
Since all traffic between the different islands in the town go through Ishigaki Island, the town office is located on Ishigaki Island. There is a project to move it to Ōhara on Iriomote Island, but with the completion of the new town office on Ishigaki Island in 2022, the project in Ōhara will probably be downsized. There are only two other municipalities in Japan whose office is located outside of the municipality: Toshima and Mishima in Kagoshima Prefecture.

- easternmost point: Taketomi Island (24.320833 N, 124.101944 E)
- westernmost point: Nakanokami Island (24.192500 N, 123.555278 E)
- southernmost point: Hateruma Island (24.045556 N, 123.788333 E)
- northernmost point: Hatoma Island (24.477222 N, 123.817222 E)

=== Administrative divisions ===
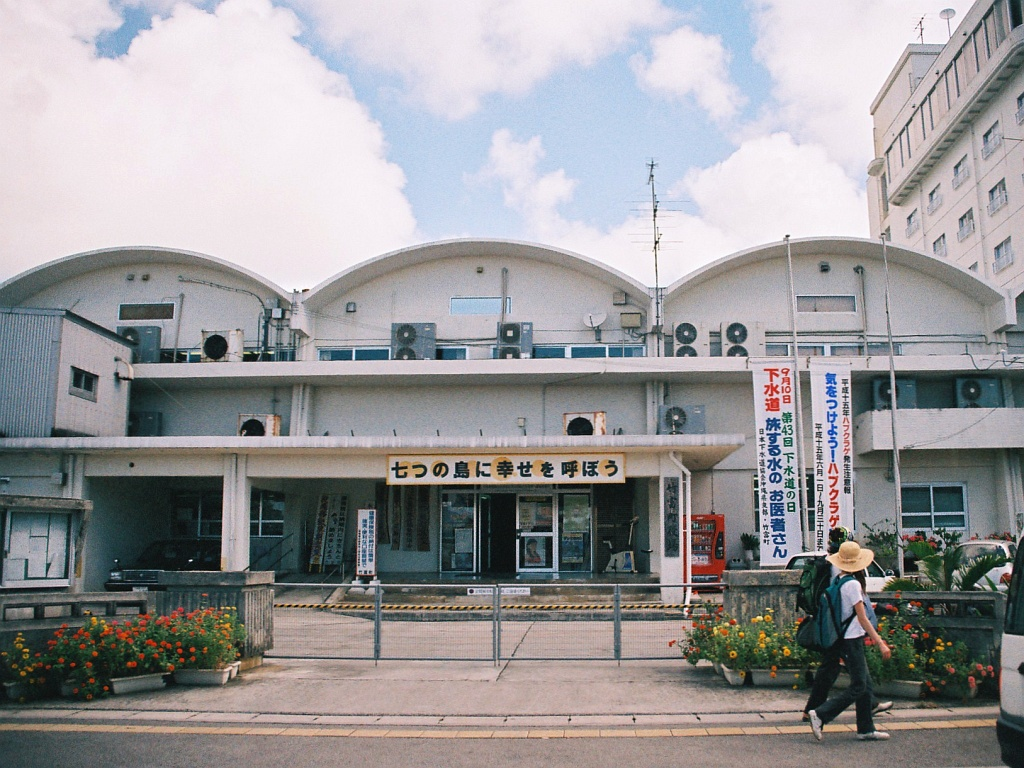
Taketomi Village Office

The town counts thirteen wards, themselves divided into thirty-six villages.

==== Aza name (Japanese) (Islands) ====
- village names (Japanese)

==== Aragusuku (新城) (Aragusuku Island) ====
- Kamiji (上地)
- Shimoji (下地)

==== Iriomote (西表) (Iriomote Island, Uchibanari Island, Sotobanari Island) ====
- Funauki (船浮)
- Hoshitate (星立)
- Shirahama (白浜)
- Sonai (祖納)

==== Uehara (上原) (Iriomote Island, Hatopanari Island) ====
- Funaura (船浦)
- Nakano (中野)
- Sumiyoshi (住吉)
- Uehara (上原)
- Urauchi (浦内)

==== Kuroshima (黒島) (Kuro Island) ====
- Akarisuji (東筋)
- Hori (保里)
- Iko (伊古)
- Miyazato (宮里)
- Nakamoto (仲本)

==== Kohama (小浜) (Kohama Island) ====
- Kohama (小浜)
- Kubozaki (細崎)

==== Komi (古見) (Iriomote Island, Yubu Island) ====
- Komi (古見)
- Mihara (美原)

==== Sakiyama (崎山) (Iriomote Island, Nakanokami Island) ====
- Amitori (網取)
- Kanokawa (鹿川)
- Sakiyama (崎山)

==== Taketomi (竹富) (Taketomi Island) ====
- Ainota (東)
- In'nota (西)
- Nāji (仲筋)

==== Haimi (南風見) (Iriomote Island) ====
- Ōhara (大原)
- Toyohara (豊原)

==== Haiminaka (南風見仲) (Iriomote Island) ====
- Ōtomi (大富)

==== Hateruma (波照間) (Hateruma Island) ====
- Fuka (冨嘉)
- Kita (北)
- Mae (前)
- Minami (南)
- Naishi (名石)

=== Nature ===
Taketomi Town, and especially Iriomote Island, is host to the Iriomote cat and the crested serpent eagle (special natural monuments), the Chinese box turtle and the Ryūkyū emerald dove (natural monuments), as well as the Sakishima grass lizard (endemic to the Yaeyama Islands). The whole area of Tatetomi Town, including the surrounding sea, is part of the Iriomote-Ishigaki National Park.

The Yaeyama Islands being located at a low latitude, 84 of the 88 constellations are visible, including the Southern Cross when the conditions are good.

The land part of the Iriomote-Ishigaki National Park, including Taketomi Town, was designated by DarkSky International as the first dark-sky preserve in Japan on 30 March 2018.

== Transportation ==
Hateruma Airport is located on Hateruma Island in Taketomi.

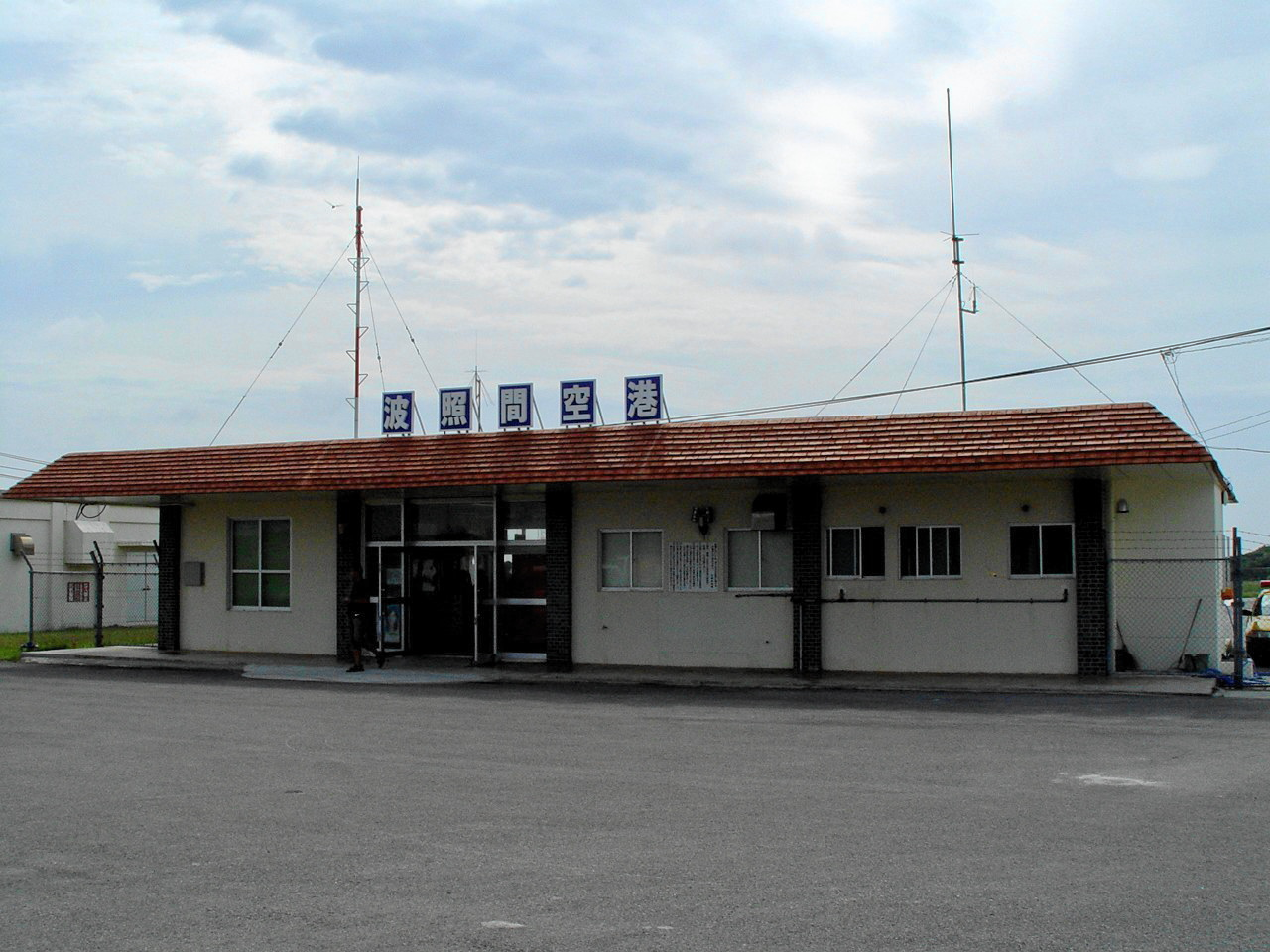
Hateruma Airport

== Education ==
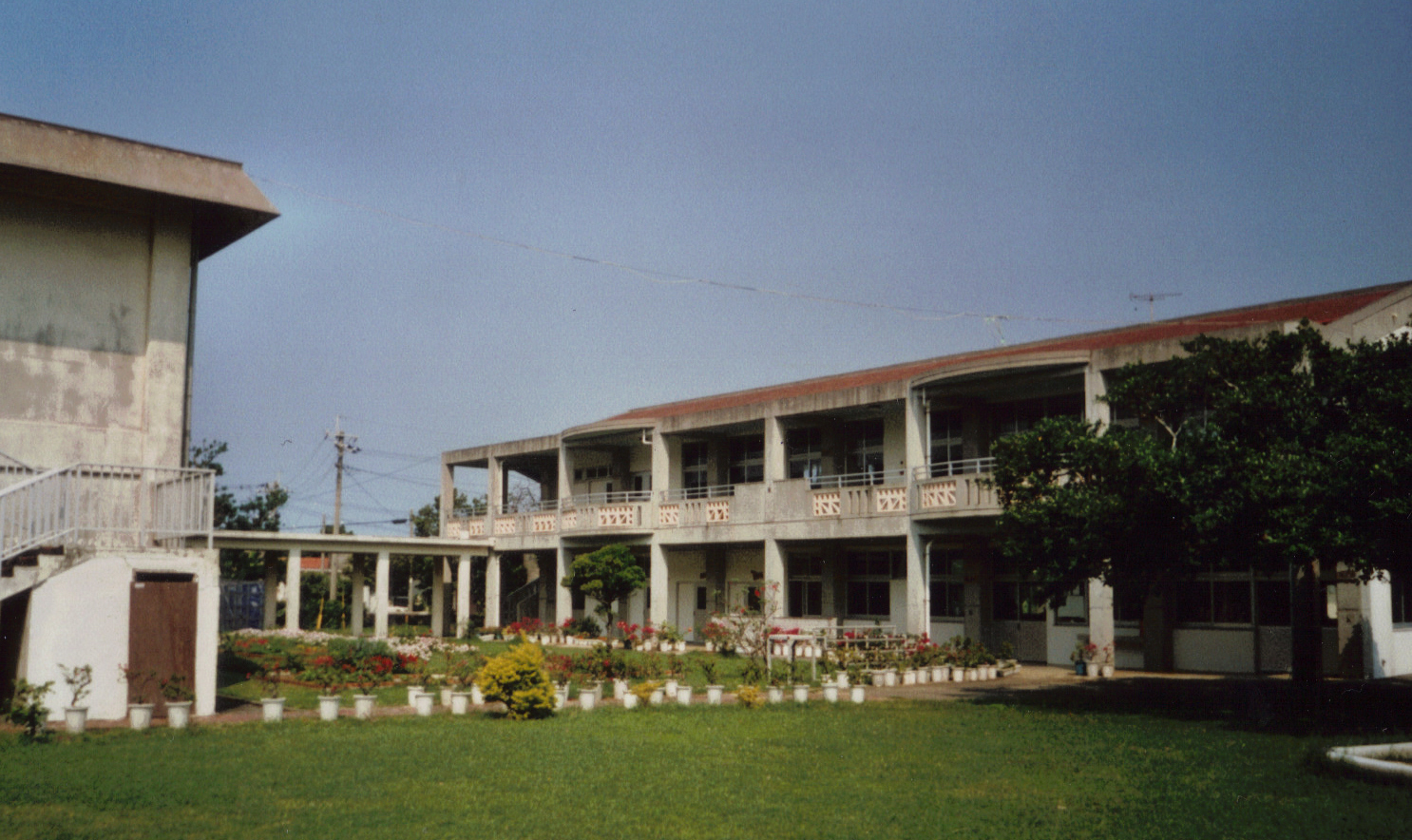
Hateruma Elementary and Junior High School (竹富町立波照間小中学校)

Combined elementary and junior high schools include:

- Funauki Elementary and Junior High School (竹富町立船浮小中学校) - Iriomote Island
- Hateruma Elementary and Junior High School (竹富町立波照間小中学校) - Hateruma
- Hatoma Elementary and Junior High School (竹富町立鳩間小中学校) - Hatoma
- Iriomote Elementary and Junior High School (竹富町立西表小中学校) – Iriomote Island
- Kohama Elementary and Junior High School (竹富町立小浜小中学校) – Kohama Island
- Kuroshima Elementary and Junior High School (竹富町立黒島小中学校) – Kuroshima Island
- Taketomi Elementary and Junior High School (竹富町立竹富小中学校) – Taketomi Island

Junior high schools include:

- Funaura Junior High School (竹富町立船浦中学校) – Uehara, Iriomote Island
- Ōhara Junior High School (竹富町立大原中学校) – Haemi, Iriomote Island

Elementary schools include:

- Komi Elementary School (竹富町立古見小学校) – Komi, Iriomote Island
- Ohara Elementary School (竹富町立大原小学校) – Haemi
- Shirama Elementary School (竹富町立白浜小学校) – Shirahama (白浜), Iriomote Island
- Uehara Elementary School (竹富町立上原小学校) – Uehara

For public senior high school students may attend schools of the Okinawa Prefectural Board of Education.

== Cultural and natural assets ==
Taketomi Town hosts sixty-three designated or registered tangible cultural properties and monuments, at the national, prefectural or municipal level.

- Name (Japanese) (Type of registration)

=== Cultural Properties ===
- Artefacts from Shimotabaru Shell Mound (下田原貝塚出土品) (Prefectural)
- Former Yonaguni Family Residence (旧与那国家住宅) (National)
- Iko Pier (伊古桟橋) (National)
- Kamiyama Family Residence (main house, stone wall, water tank, well) (神山家住宅 主屋、石垣、水タンク、井戸) (National)
- Minamikawada Yonatoshi's clothing and tea utensils (南川田於那利の衣装及び茶器) (Municipal)
- Nagomi Tower (なごみの塔) (National)
- Nakasujinu Nubema's water jar (仲筋ぬヌベマの水がめ) (Municipal)
- Official clothing of Inafuku Chikudun (稲福筑登之正装) (Municipal)
- Ōmori Family Residence (main house, hinpun wall, stone wall, well) (大盛家住宅 主屋、ヒンプン、石垣、井戸) (National)
- Shinmori Family Residence (新盛家住宅) (Prefectural)
- West Pier (西桟橋) (National)

=== Folk Cultural Properties ===
- Tools for life on Taketomi Island (竹富島の生活用具) (National)
- Uhira-kā spring (大平井戸 (ウヒラカー)) (Municipal)

=== Historic Sites ===
- An'nukā Spring (下り井戸) (Municipal)
- Banjo guards office site (番所跡) (Municipal)
- Birthplace of Akahachi (アカハチ誕生の地) (Municipal)
- Inumuru (Aji's castle site) (イヌムル (按司の城跡)) (Municipal)
- Isanchayā Old Tomb (イサンチャヤー (古墓)) (Municipal)
- Kandoura stone (thunder stone / spirit stone) (カンドウラ石 (雷石、霊石)) (Municipal)
- Keraikedagusuku Residence site (慶来慶田城翁屋敷跡) (Municipal)
- Kuinupana Site (クイヌパナ) (Municipal)
- Kuramoto (Local Office) Site (蔵元跡) (Prefectural)
- Miina-kā spring (ミーナ井戸) (Municipal)
- Nagaki fishing wall (海垣・魚垣 (ながき)) (Municipal)
- Nagata Utaki Sacred Site (長田御嶽) (Municipal)
- Nakama No. 1 Shell Mound (仲間第一貝塚) (Prefectural)
- Nakama No. 2 Shell Mound (仲間第二貝塚) (Prefectural)
- Nishitō On Sacred Site (西塘御嶽) (Prefectural)
- Ōtakesonaidōgiza's residence site (大竹祖納堂儀佐屋敷跡) (Municipal)
- Pinishii Shell Mound (平西貝塚) (Prefectural)
- Pisada Road (ピサダ道) (Municipal)
- Utisukuyama Site (ウティスク山遺跡) (Municipal)
- Sakishima Beacons (Kusukumui beacon, Puzumari beacon, Takaniku beacon, Nakamui -Haterumamui- beacon, Kōtomui beacon, Nakamui beacon, Ufudaki beacon) (先島諸島火番盛 (小城盛、プズマリ、タカニク、中森〔波照間ムリ〕、コート盛、中森、大岳)) (National)
- Shichisadameishi stone (節定め石) (Municipal)
- Shimotabaru Castle Site (下田原城跡) (National)
- Shimotabaru Shell Mound (下田原貝塚) (Prefectural)
- Shimusukē spring (シムスケー) (Municipal)
- Shinzato village remains (新里村遺跡) (Municipal)
- Yāmayasukyi shed in the Kohama Residence (小浜家のヤーマヤスキィ) (Municipal)

=== Places of scenic beauty ===
- Scenery of Takana (高那の景勝) (Municipal)
- Ufudaki (大岳) (Municipal)

=== Natural Monuments ===
- Asabishibana Stone (アサビシバナ (遊び岩)) (Municipal)
- Bantigue mangrove plant community (浜シタン群落) (Municipal)
- Banyan tree plant community of Kōkibaru (コーキ原のガジュマル群落)
- Hatoma-nakamori forest (鳩間中森) (Municipal)
- Hoshitate Natural Protected Area (星立天然保護区域) (National)
- Looking-glass mangrove community in Komi Heritiera littoralis (古見のサキシマスオウノキ群落) (National)
- Nakama River Natural Protected Area (仲間川天然保護区域) (National)
- Nakanokami Island sea birds breeding grounds (仲の神島海鳥繁殖地) (National)
- Nipa palm communities of Funaura Nypa fruticans (船浦のニッパヤシ群落) (National)
- Old bay tree (タブの老木) (Municipal)
- Old mulberry tree (桑の老木) (Municipal)
- Ryūkyū moonflower (Monoon liukiuense) plant community of Shiisabaru Wā Sacred Site (白朗原御嶽クロボウモドキ群落) (Municipal)
- Ryūkyū moonflower (Monoon liukiuense) plant community of Ubaruta (大保良田クロボウモドキ群落) (Municipal)
- Satake palm community in Ubundoru Satakentia liukiuensis (ウブンドルのヤエヤマヤシ群落) (National)
- Sea almond tree of Kamadoma (カマドマのクバデサー) (Municipal)
- Yaeyama hamago of Funauki Vitex trifolia var. bicolor (船浮のヤエヤマハマゴウ) (Prefectural)
