= Kohama Island =

Island within Ryukyu Islands

Coordinates: 24°20′30″N 123°58′45″E

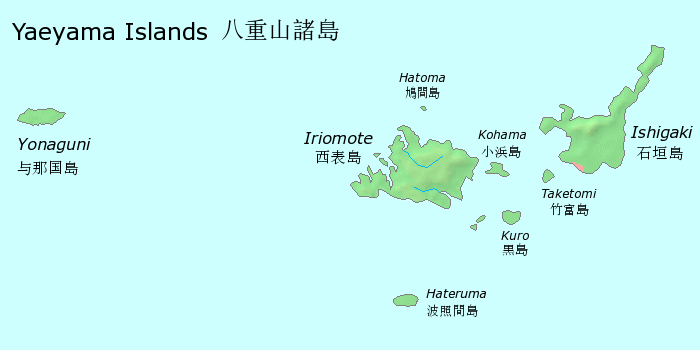
Kohama is located between Iriomote and Ishigaki Islands.

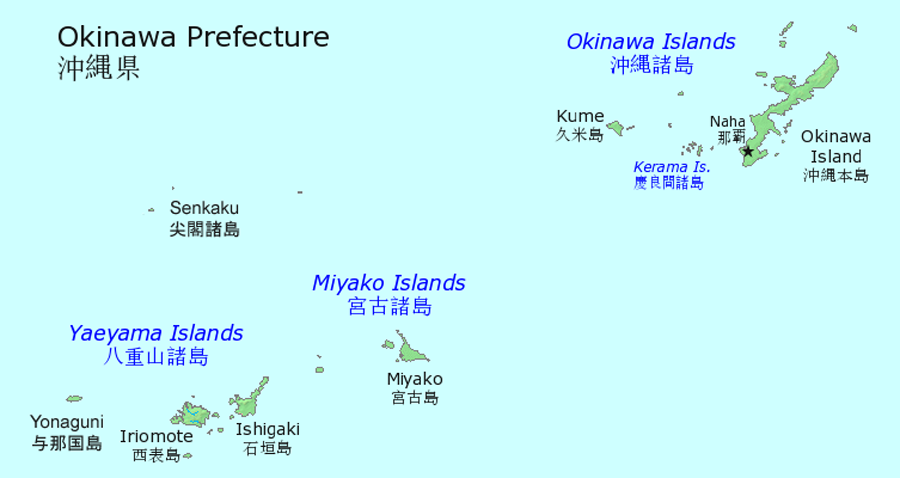
The Yaeyama Islands are located at the southwest point of Okinawa Prefecture.

Kohama Island (小浜島, Kohama-jima) (Yaeyama: Kumoo, Okinawan: Kubama) is an island in the Yaeyama Islands group at the southwestern end of the Ryukyu Islands chain, and part of Taketomi, Yaeyama District, Okinawa Prefecture, Japan. The island has an area of 7.84 km^{2} (3.03 sq mi), with a surrounding area of 16.6 km^{2} (6.4 sq mi). The island is located about 25 minutes by ferry from Ishigaki Island, which is the transportation and business center of the Yaeyama Islands.

The 2001 NHK drama series Churasan was set on the island. Shinobu Miyara, former member of Da Pump, is from Kohama-jima. The octogenarian "idol" group, KBG84, has given Kohama much media coverage.

== Access ==
Kohamajima is accessible via several ferries from Ishigaki Marina, Taketomi Island, and Iriomote Island.

Yaeyama Kankō Ferry
Ishigaki Island Port (Ritō Terminal): About 25 minutes one way, 11 ferries daily from morning until evening. A "car ferry" runs about 3 times weekly.
Taketomi Island: About 20 minutes one way, once daily
Iriomote Island Ōhara Port: About 30 minutes one way, once daily

An'ei Kankō
Ishigaki Island Port (Ritō Terminal): About 25 minutes one way, 10 ferries daily from morning until evening. A "car ferry" runs about 3 times weekly.

Ishigaki Island Dream Kankō
Ishigaki Island Port (Ritō Terminal): About 25 minutes one way, 6 ferries daily from morning until evening. One trip daily stops at Ōhara Port mid-trip.
Taketomi Island: About 30 minutes one way, once daily, with a stop at Ishigaki Island Port

== Sights ==
As the TV drama Churasan was very popular all over Japan, Kohamajima is visited by comparatively many tourists. Kohaguraso, a historic house in Kohama, the only village on the island, is one of the most important tourist attractions, as the drama was set here. The house, which is built in the traditional style with a hip roof and a veranda, is surrounded by a wall made of coral stones. Another tourist attraction is a road in the eastern part of the island where sugarcane is grown. The road which got the nickname Sugar Road can be seen in the TV drama as well.

Mount Ufudaki is the highest spot of the island. Its height is 99 m. The viewpoint on its top offers a scenic view of the whole island and of Iriomote, the neighbouring island.

The small museum in the village of Kohama is worth a visit as well. On the eastern beach of Kohamajima there is a white gate. An old staircase with white lilies on both sides leads to a small sacred stone which is on a small hill under an old tree.

== Infrastructure ==
There are some small shops, restaurants and guesthouses on the island. The village has a modern school and an administration building. Outside the village there is a large hotel resort.

== Education ==
The Taketomi town authorities maintain a single combined elementary and junior high school on the island: Kohama Elementary and Junior High School (竹富町立小浜小中学校).

For public senior high school students may attend schools of the Okinawa Prefectural Board of Education.

== Impressions from Kohamajima ==
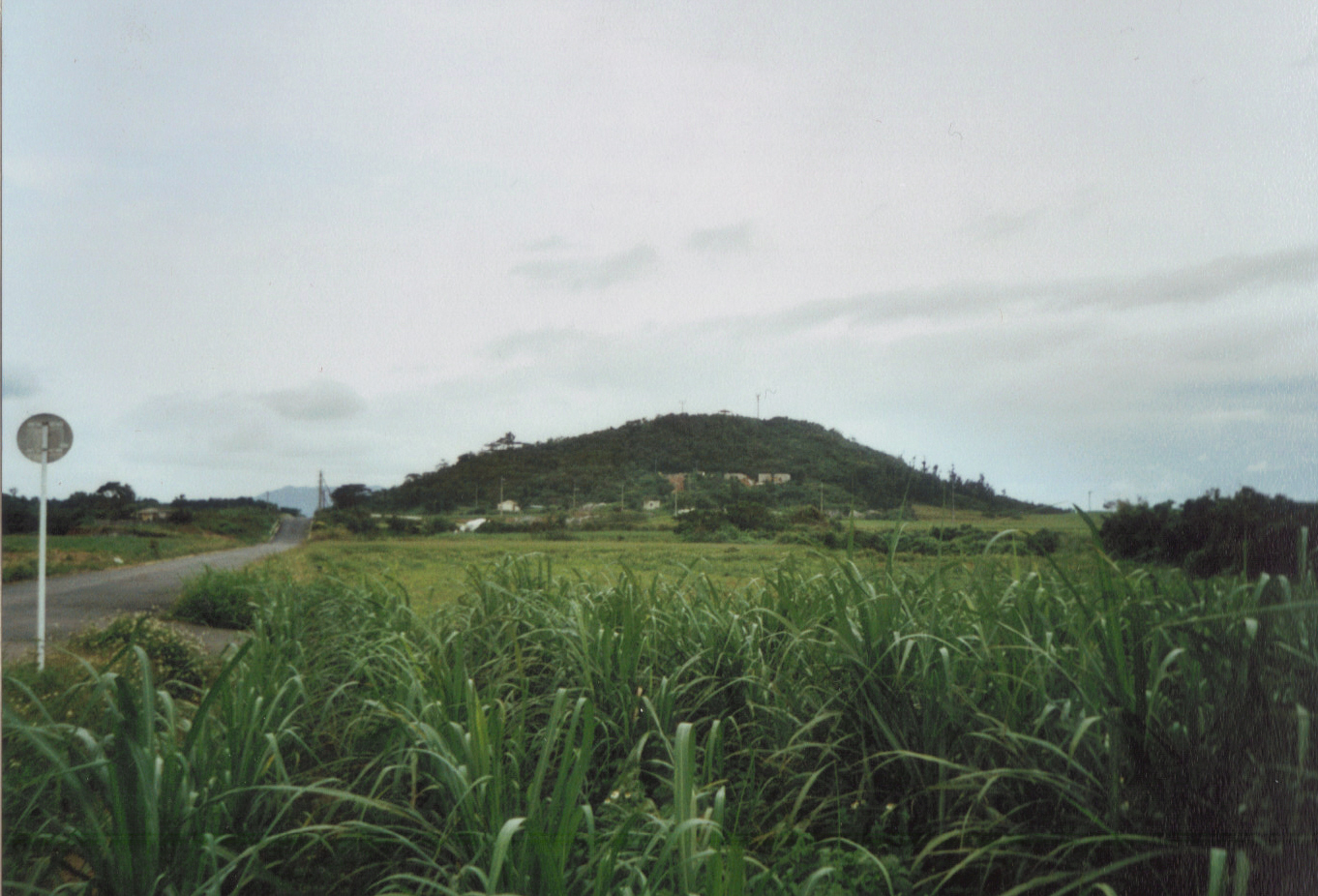
View to Mount Ufudaki

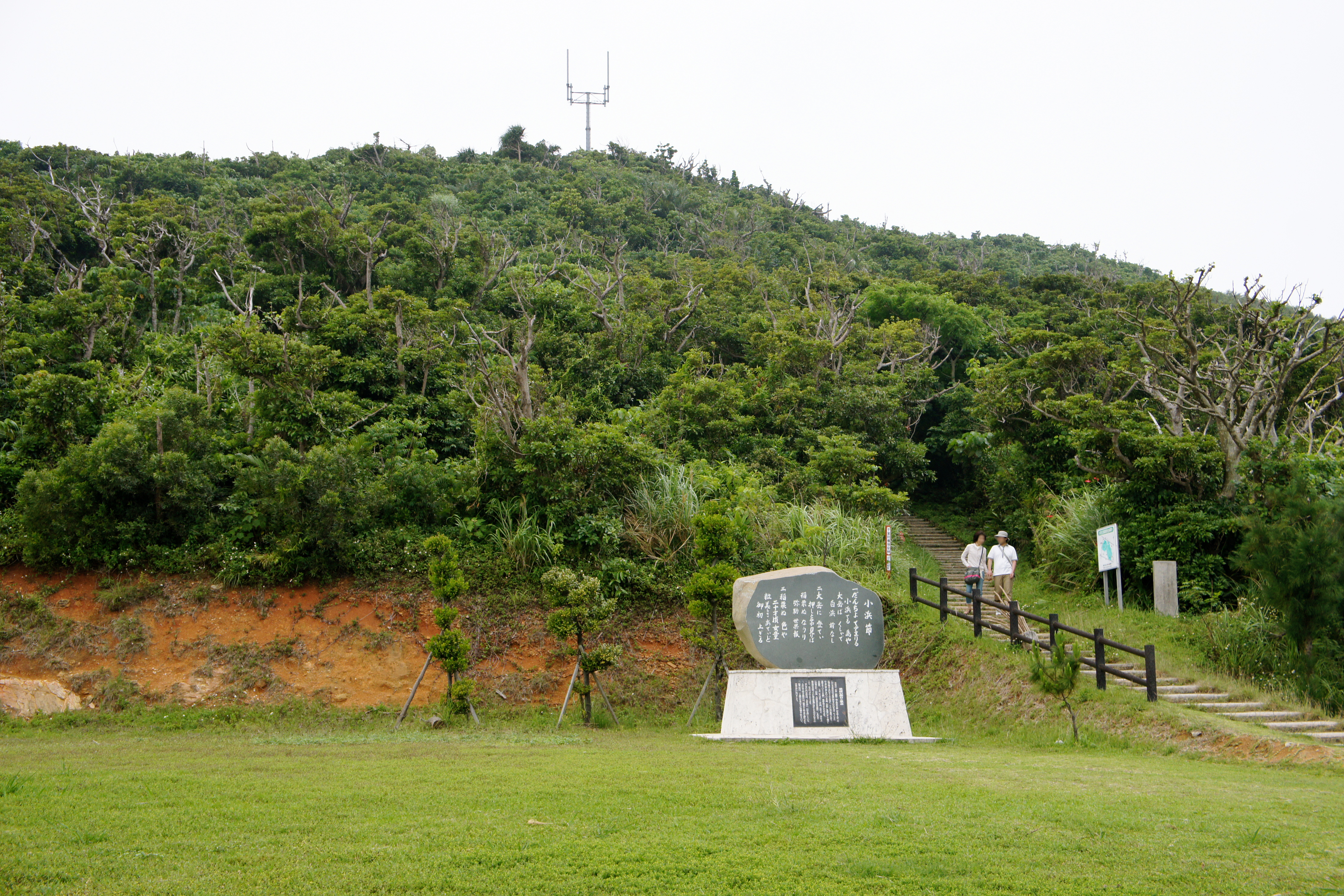
Mount Ufudaki

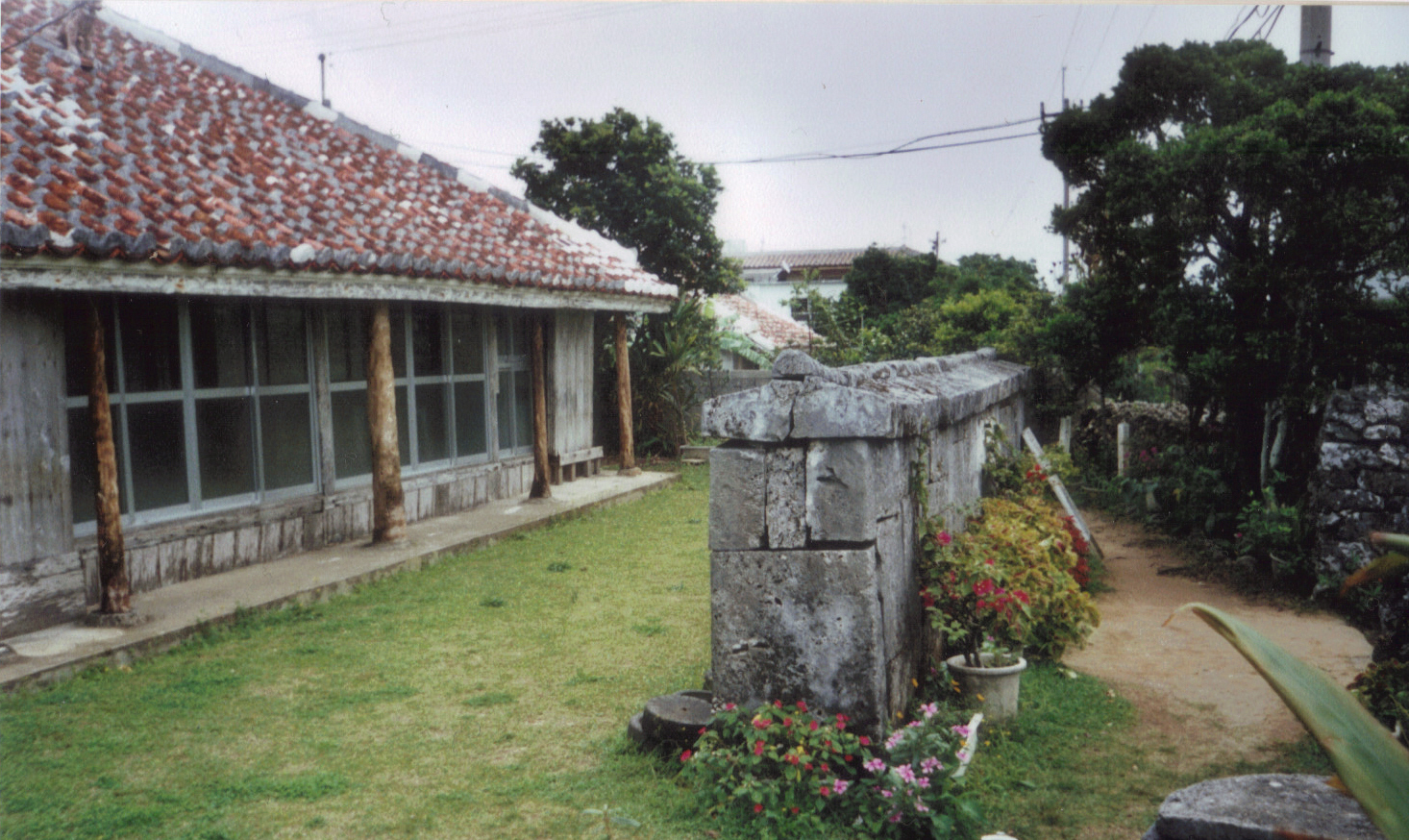
Traditional architecture: Kohaguraso

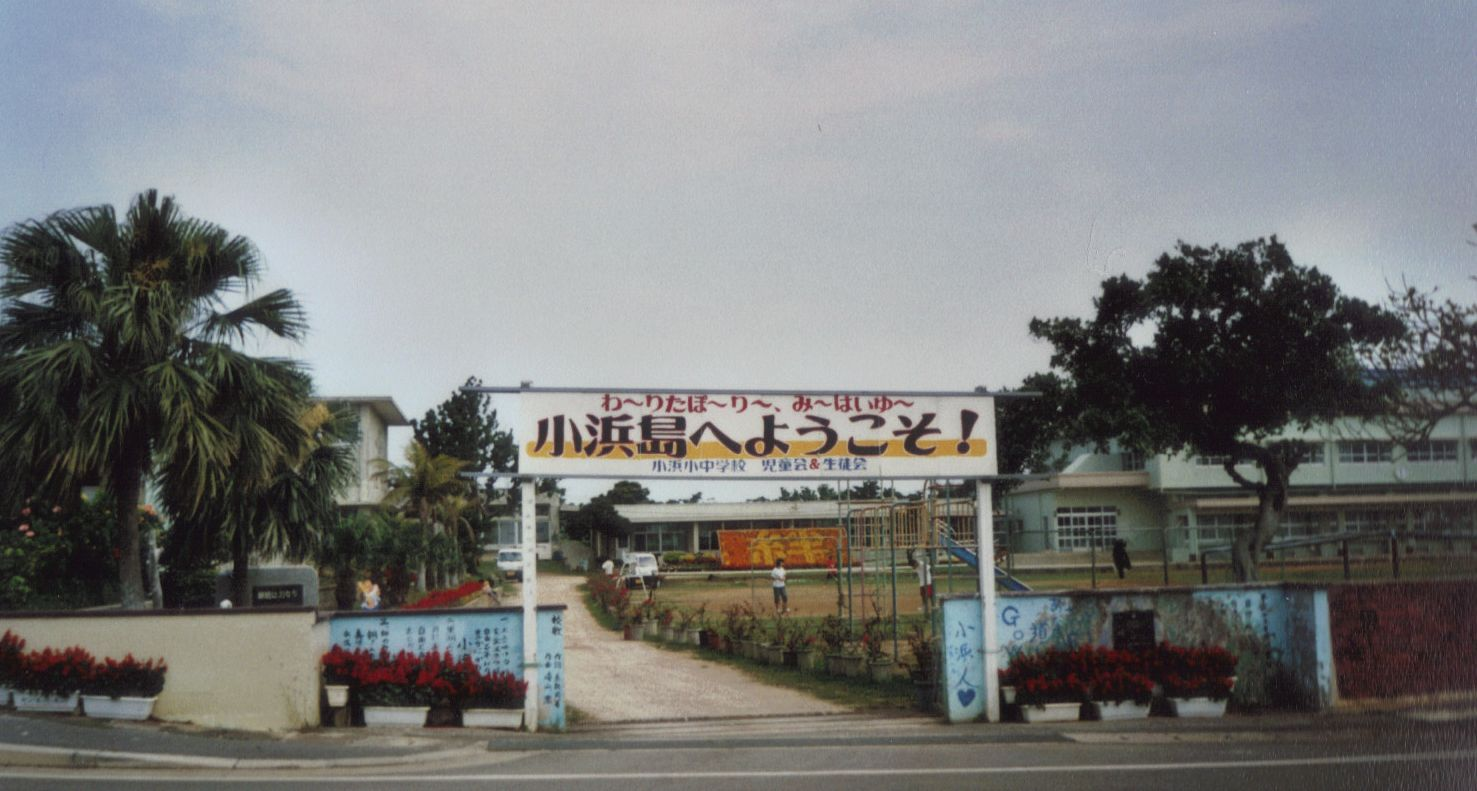
High Street of Kohama Village

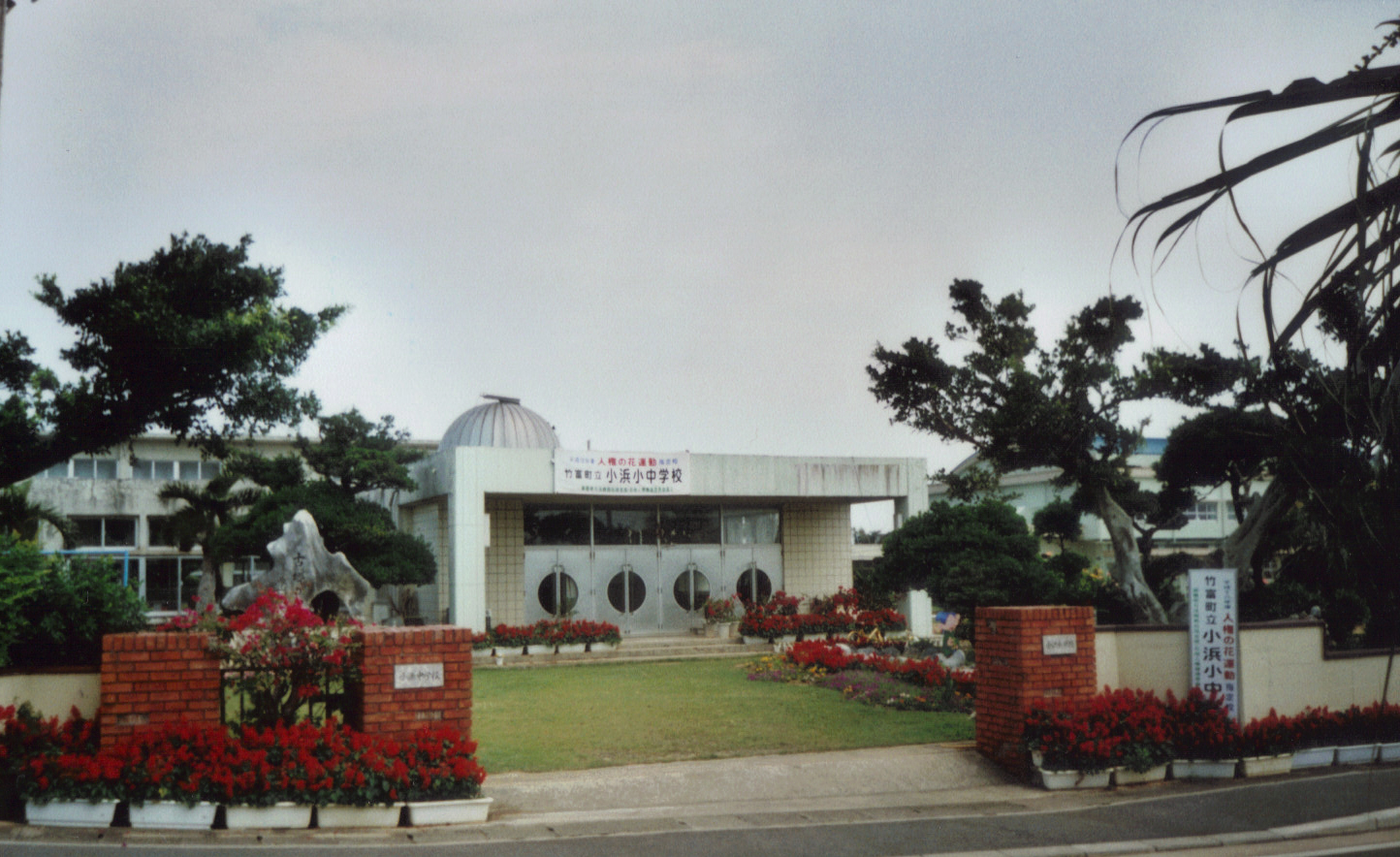
School in Kohama Village

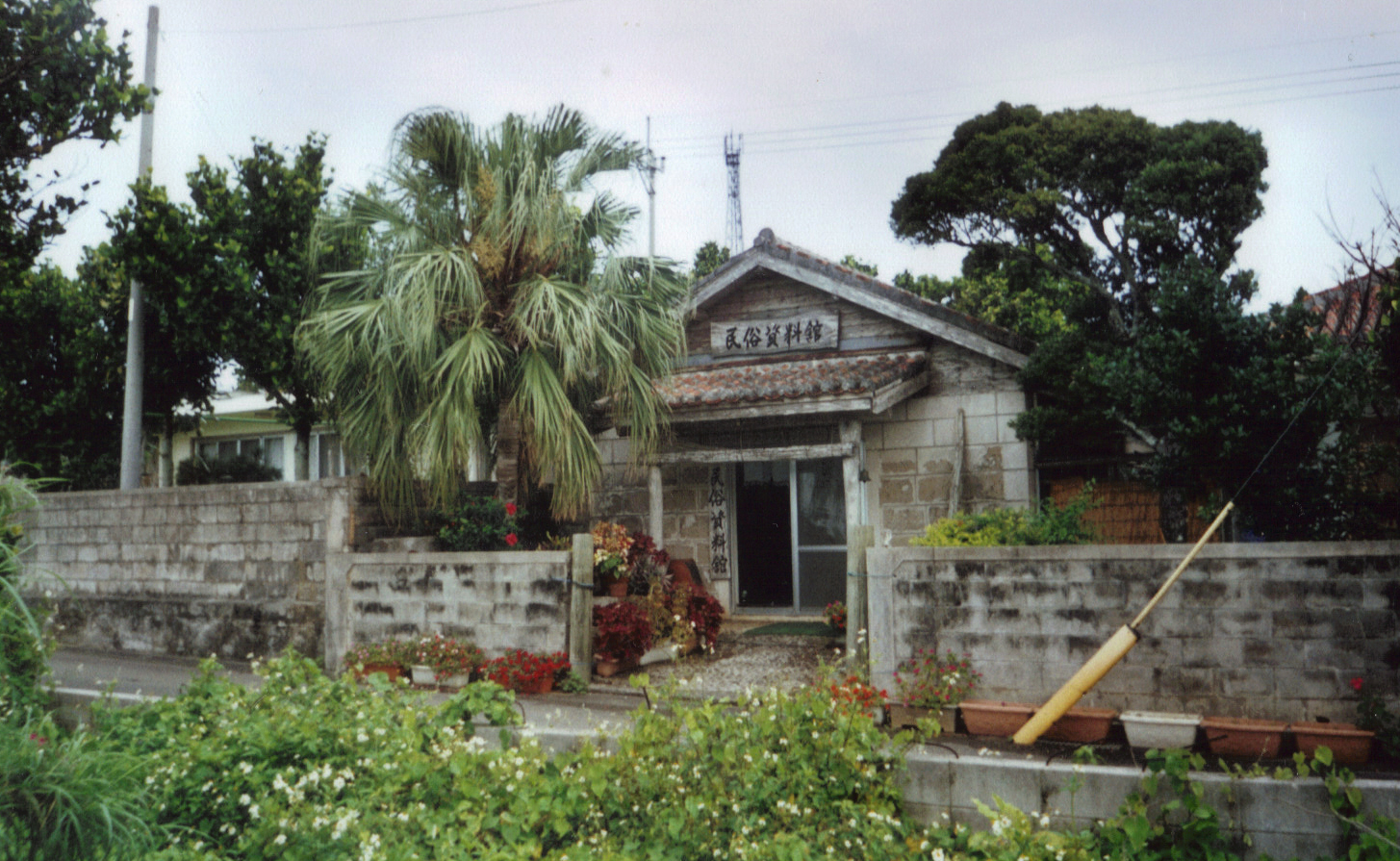
Museum

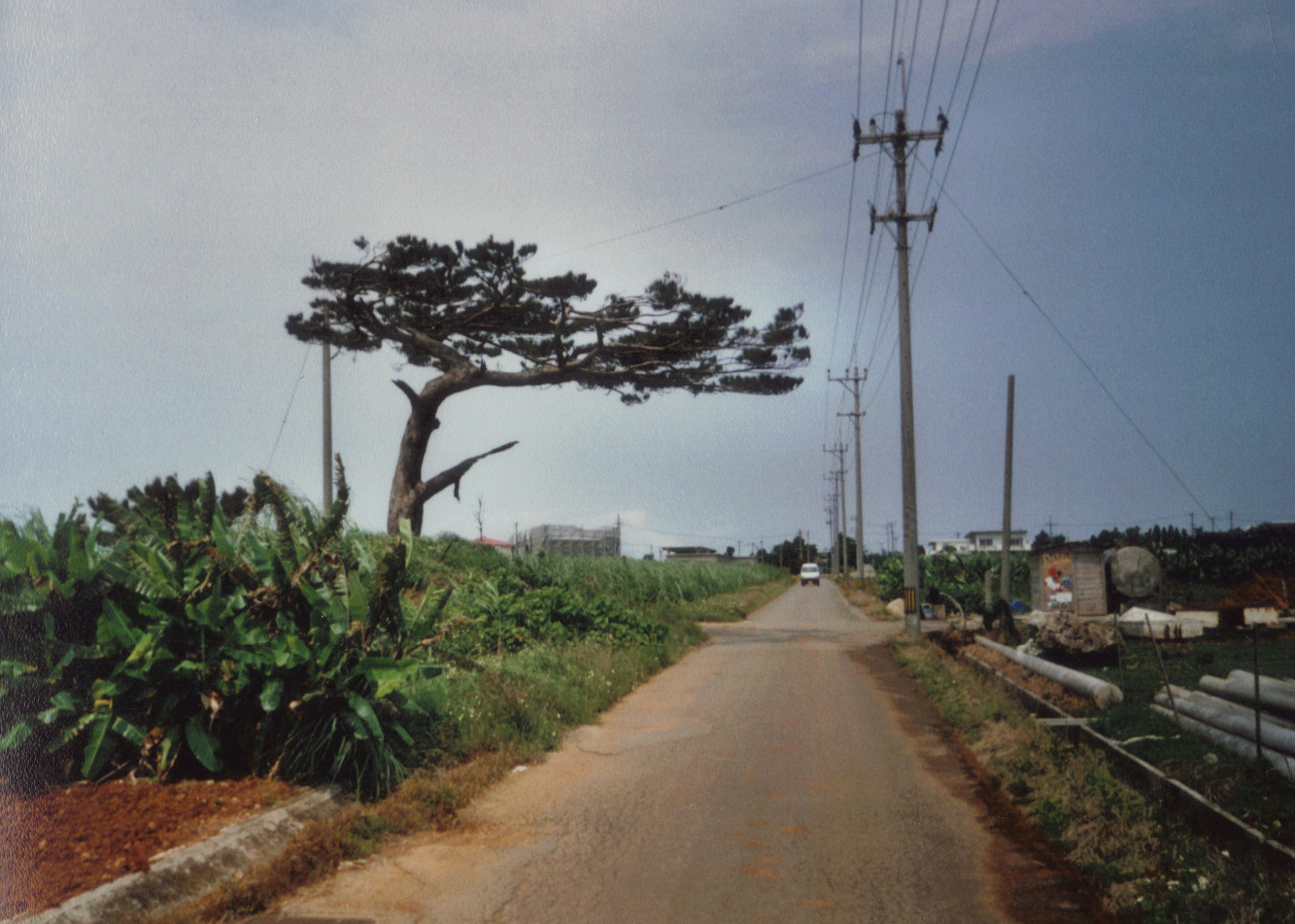
Sugar Road

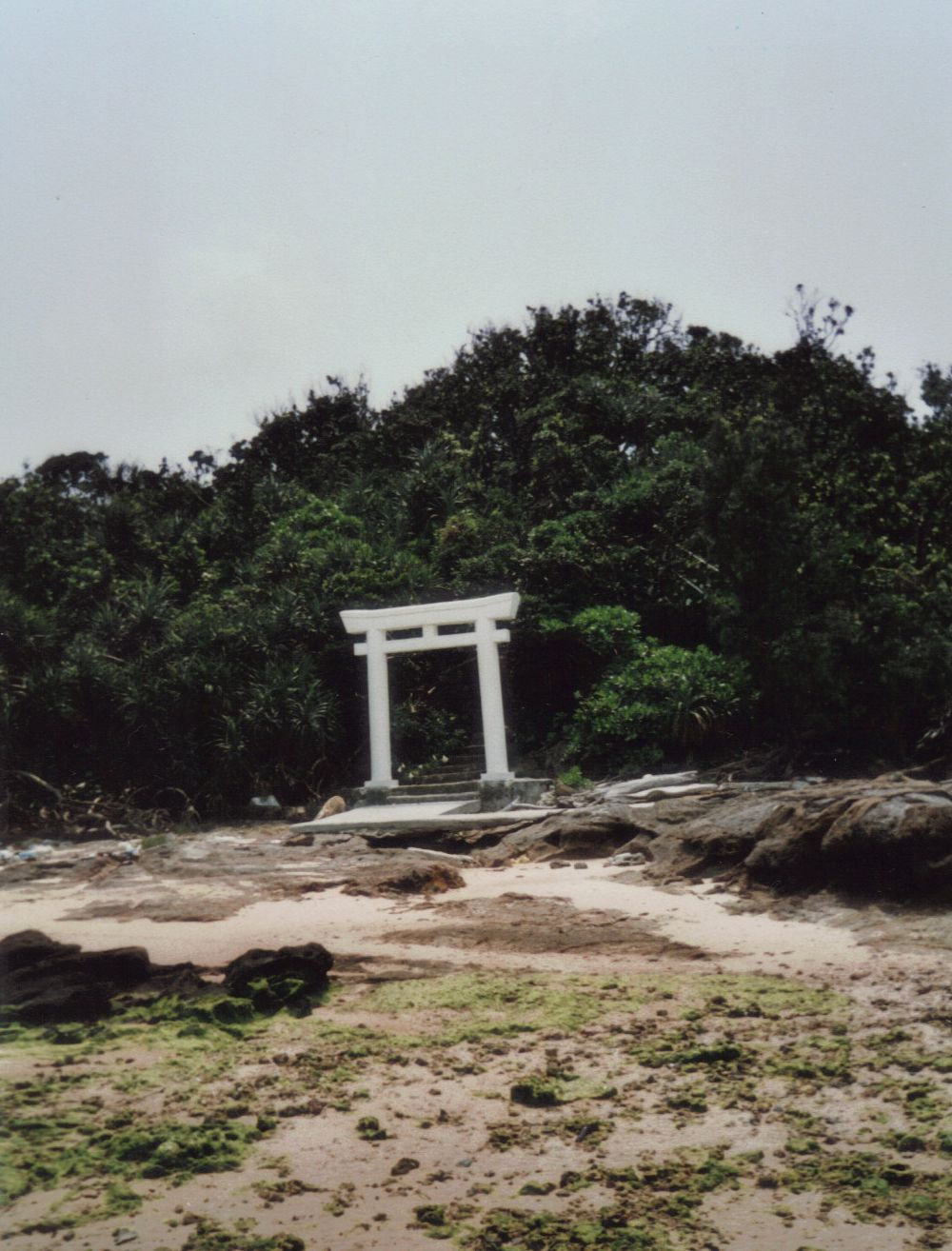
Tori on the beach in the east of Kohama-jima
