= Hatoma =

Island within Ryukyu Islands

Coordinates: 24°28′20″N 123°49′12″E

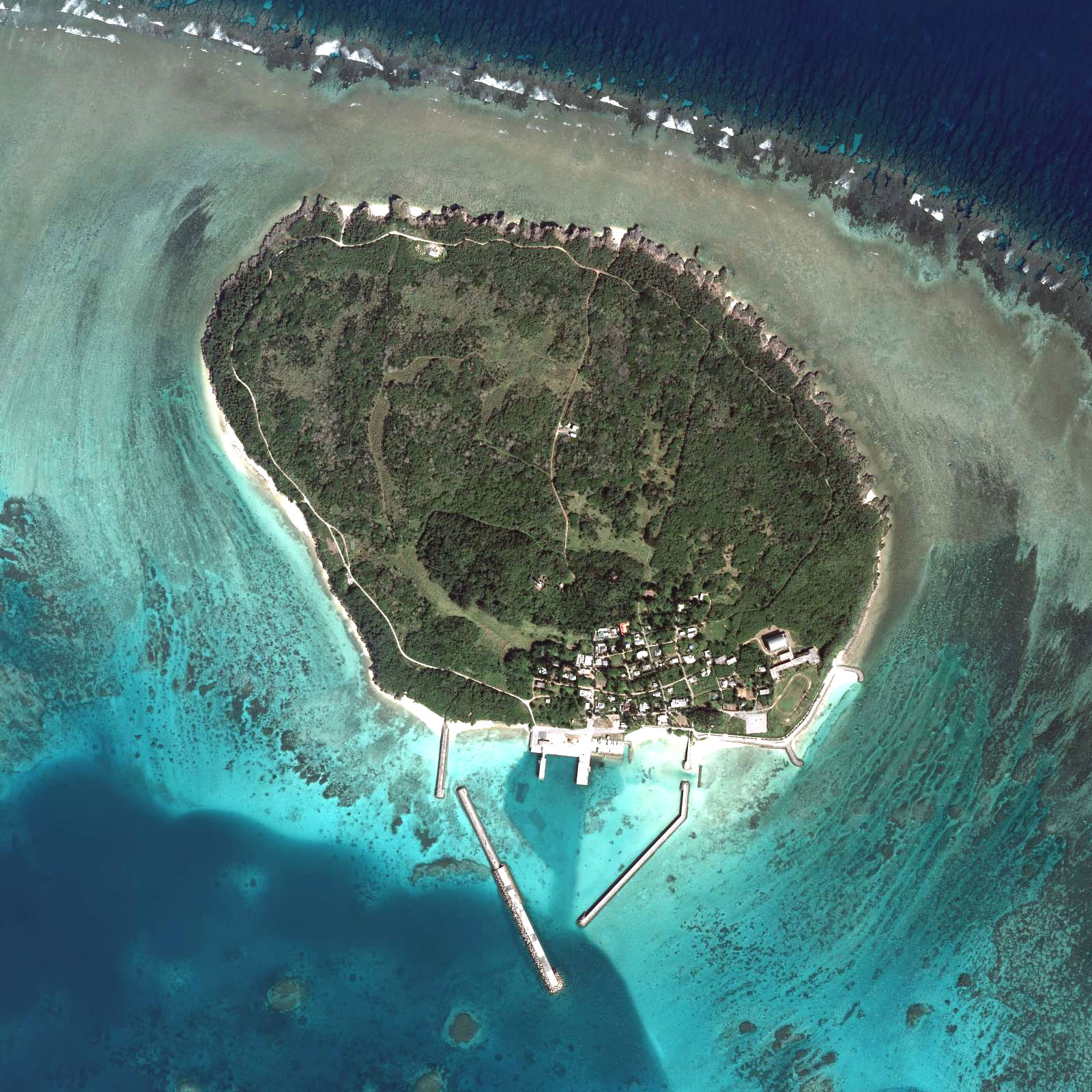
Aerial photograph of Hatoma in 2009

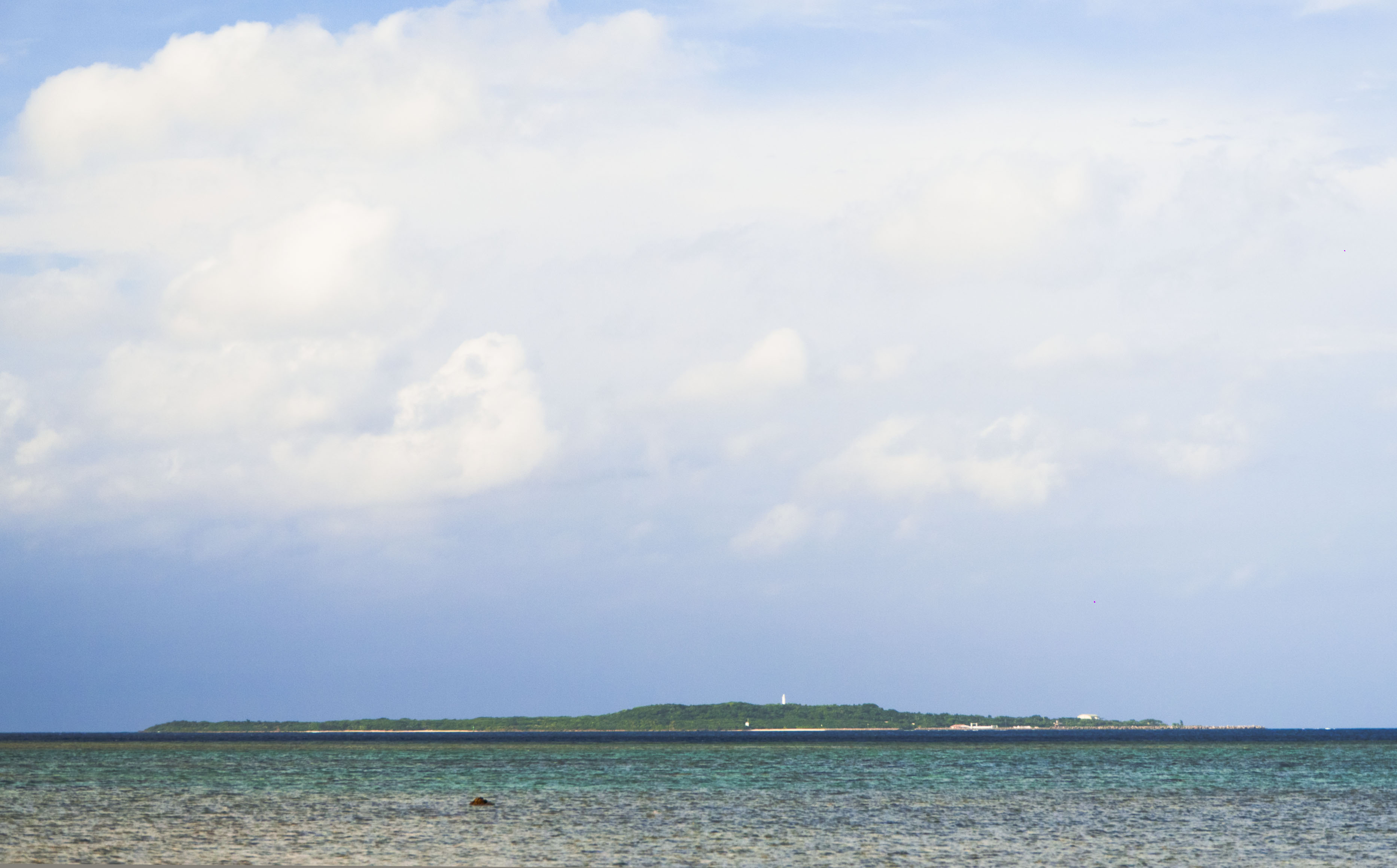
Hatoma as viewed from Iriomote

Hatoma (鳩間島, Hatoma-jima; Yaeyama: Patuma; Okinawan: Hatuma) is a small island of the Yaeyama Islands, approximately 1 kilometre (0.6 mi) in diameter. It is under the administration of Taketomi District, Okinawa Prefecture, Japan. In local language, the island's name is pronounced Patuma.

== Geography ==
Hatoma is located just north of Iriomote. It is a tiny island, with an area of just 0.96 km^{2} (0.37 sq mi), a circumference of 3.9 km (2.4 mi), and a population of about 48.

== History ==
Hatoma has been continuously inhabited for at least several centuries, if not longer. Excavations on the island have shown that until recent times, Hatoma residents subsisted largely on shellfish gathered in the surrounding shallow waters, and vegetables.

Unlike nearby Iriomote, Hatoma was not infested by malaria; hence its long-term settlement.

In the early 1900s, Hatoma flourished as a skipjack tuna fishing port. At that time, the population of the island numbered in the hundreds. In 1968, because of the declining economic viability of skipjack tuna fishing (partly due to decreased consumption of katsuobushi due to the use of MSG in its stead), katsuobushi (dried and smoked skipjack tuna) processing facilities on the island were shut down, but the demographic decline started well before this.

With the decline of its only industry, the population of Hatoma rapidly shrank. When the population of its only school fell to just a handful, the Taketomi authorities attempted to shut it down. The island residents, however, fought to keep the school open, and succeeded by using an innovative program: households take in the children from mainland Japan who, for reasons of stress or mental difficulties, could not attend a local school, and send them to the school on Hatoma. This program, called Kaihin Ryūgaku (海浜留学) (foster homes), still survives to this day, and the school's doors remain open.

Being a small, outlying island, infrastructure was slow to come to Hatoma; the island did not receive electricity until the 1960s.

== Education ==
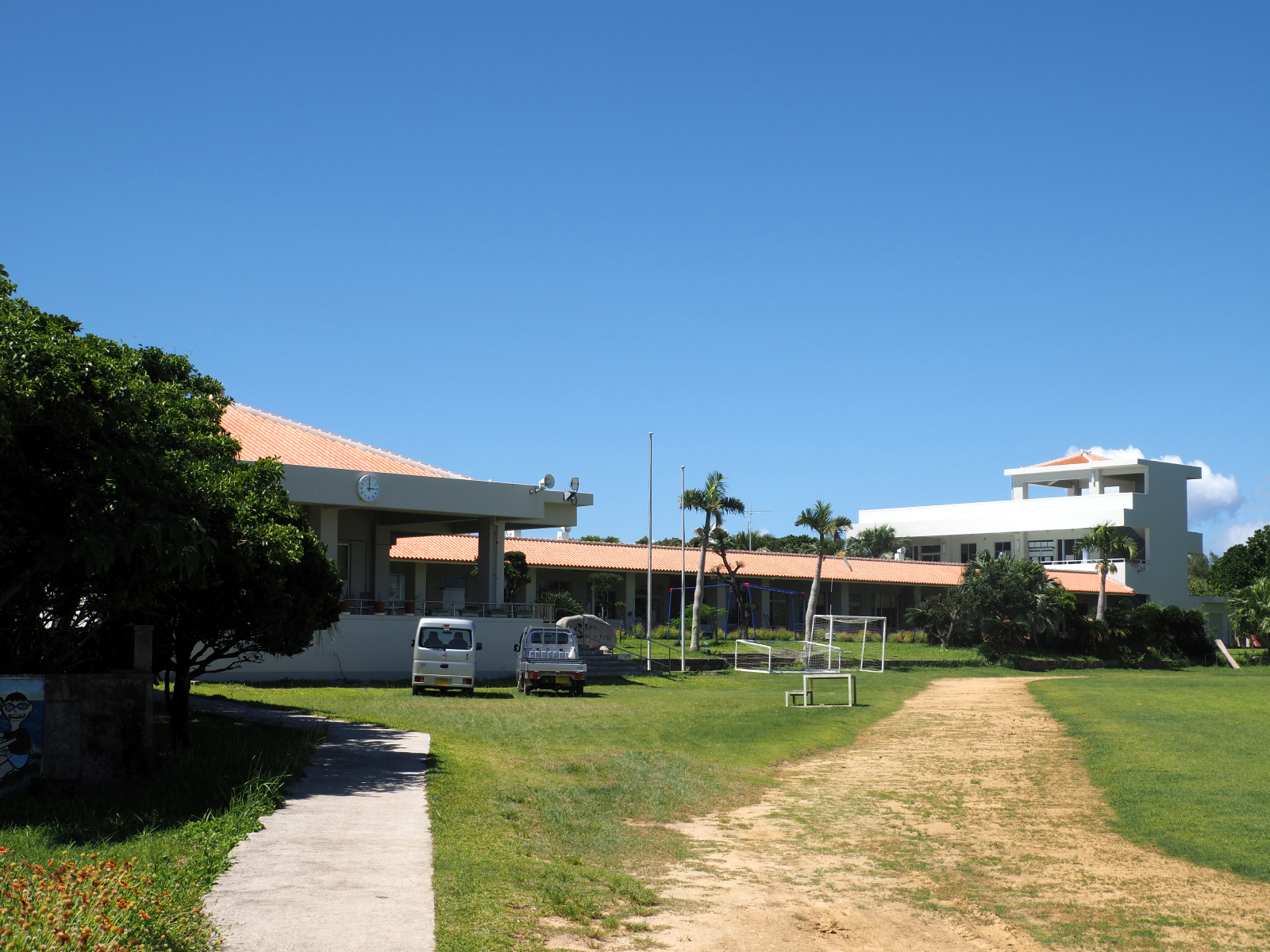
Hatoma Elementary and Junior High School

The Taketomi town authorities maintain a single combined elementary and junior high school on the island: Hatoma Elementary and Junior High School (竹富町立鳩間小中学校).

For public senior high school students may attend schools of the Okinawa Prefectural Board of Education.

== Cultural references ==
Featured in the 2005 Japanese television drama Ruri no Shima (Ruri's Island), by Nippon TV.

Was covered by Chris Broad for an episode on his YouTube channel Abroad in Japan.
