= Kuroshima (Okinawa) =

Island within Ryukyu Islands

Coordinates: 24°14′00″N 124°01′00″E

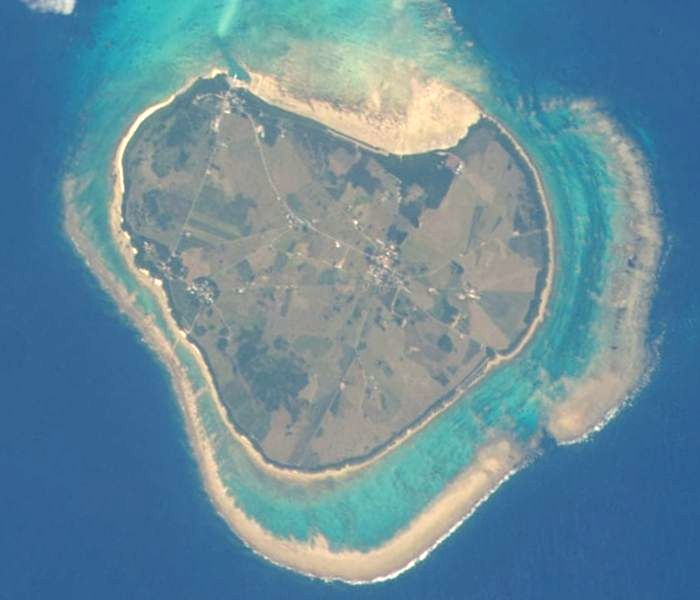
Satellite view of Kuroshima

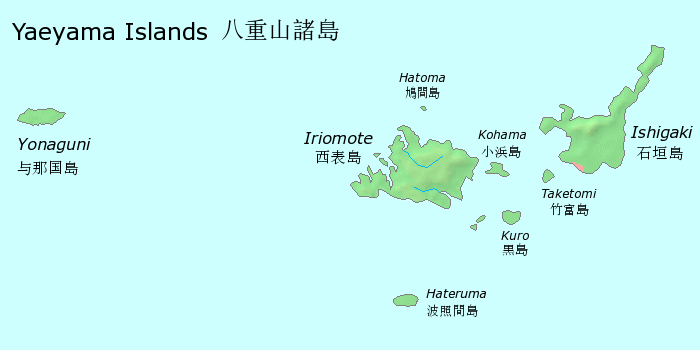
Map of the Yaeyama Islands

Kuroshima (黒島; Yaeyama: Ffusïma, Okinawan: Kurushima), also known as "Kuro Island", is an island in Taketomi Town, Okinawa, Japan, part of the Yaeyama archipelago. The island has the approximate shape of a heart symbol when viewed from the air, and is marketed as "Heart Island". The name means "Black Island".

The island has an area of about 10 km^{2} (4 sq mi) and a population of approximately 210 as of 2006. Kuroshima is a comparatively flat island, as the highest point is just 15 metres (49 ft) above sea level.

Cattle raising is a major economic activity and a yearly "cow festival" is held. Sometimes the island is marketed as "Island of Cows" as well, as there are more cows than inhabitants living on it. Tourist activities include diving and sunbathing.

== Sights ==
Kuroshima has various sights to offer:

- A lighthouse stands at the southern tip.
- In the Visitors' Center in the west of the island various old photos, stuffed animals and traditional fishing and agricultural equipment are on display.
- Puzumari is an old tower built of dark coral stones close to the Visitors' Center. During the times of the Ryukyu Kingdom, the top of the tower was the highest point of the whole island, and it was used to observe the ships going to and from Ishigaki and to send fire signals to the neighbouring island. There are similar towers dating from the 17th century on other islands of the Yaeyama group as well, e.g. Hateruma.
- Nakamoto Beach, the west coast of Kuroshima, is worth a visit as well. Impressive corals can be seen close to a small Shinto Shrine at low tide.
- In the middle of Kuroshima there is a tower offering a scenic view of the whole island.
- Several ruins consisting of dark coral stones overgrown with plants are scattered all over the island.
- Traditional architecture is well preserved in the village in the middle of the island. Many houses which have a typical hip roof are still surrounded by walls built of dark coral stones.
- The banana trees vegetate and bear fruit on the island helped by high temperatures.
- Sea Turtle Association of Japan, Kuroshima Research Station

== Infrastructure ==
Kuroshima can be reached by ferry from Ishigaki several times a day. Bikes are for hire at the small harbour in the north of the island. All the sights can easily be reached on foot. There are several guest houses (minshuku) on Kuroshima. In the village, there is a shop and a post offices which serves as a bank as well.

== Education ==
The Taketomi town authorities maintain a single combined elementary and junior high school on the island: Kuroshima Elementary and Junior High School (竹富町立黒島小中学校).

For public senior high school students may attend schools of the Okinawa Prefectural Board of Education.

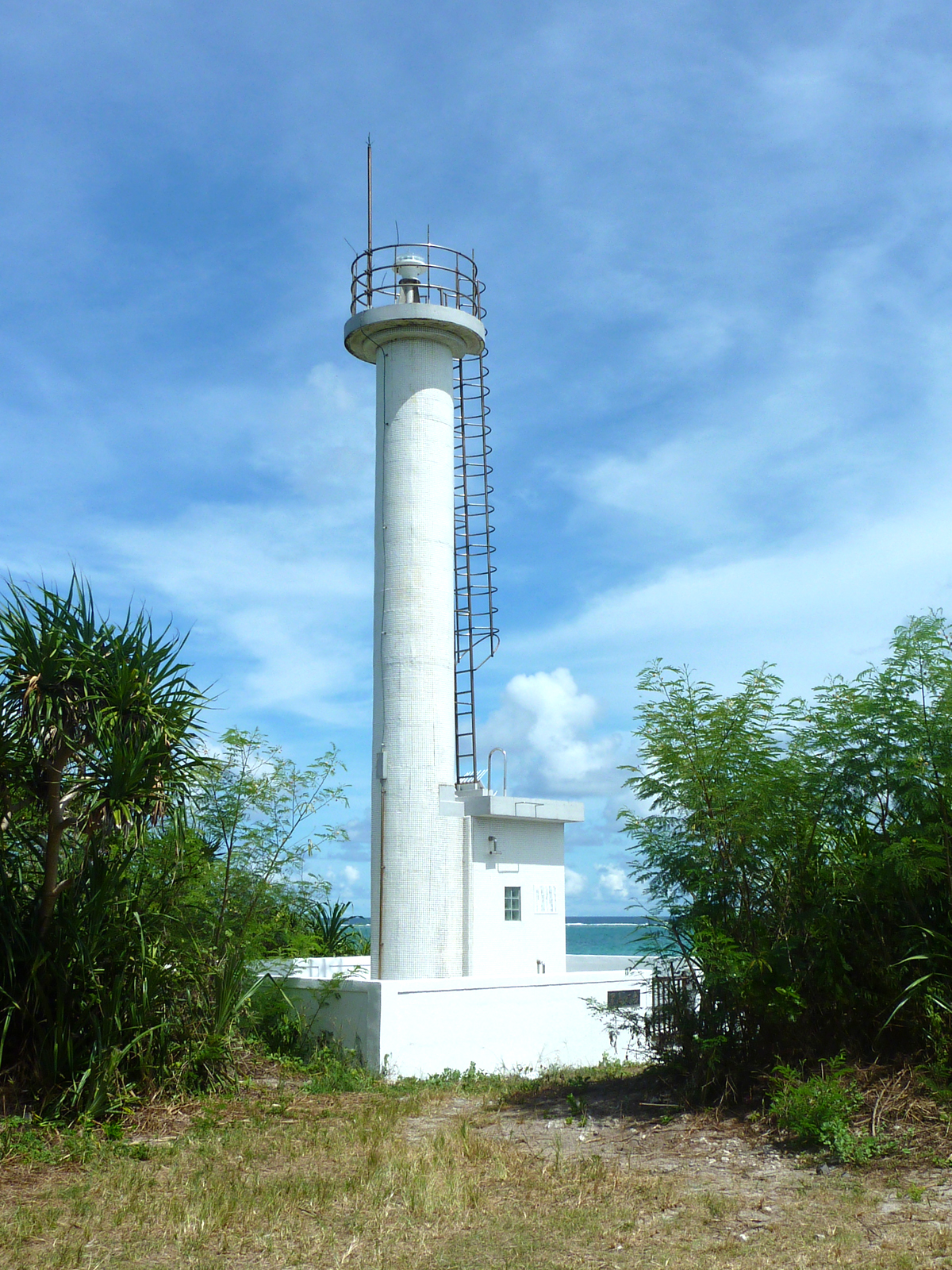
Kuroshima Lighthouse

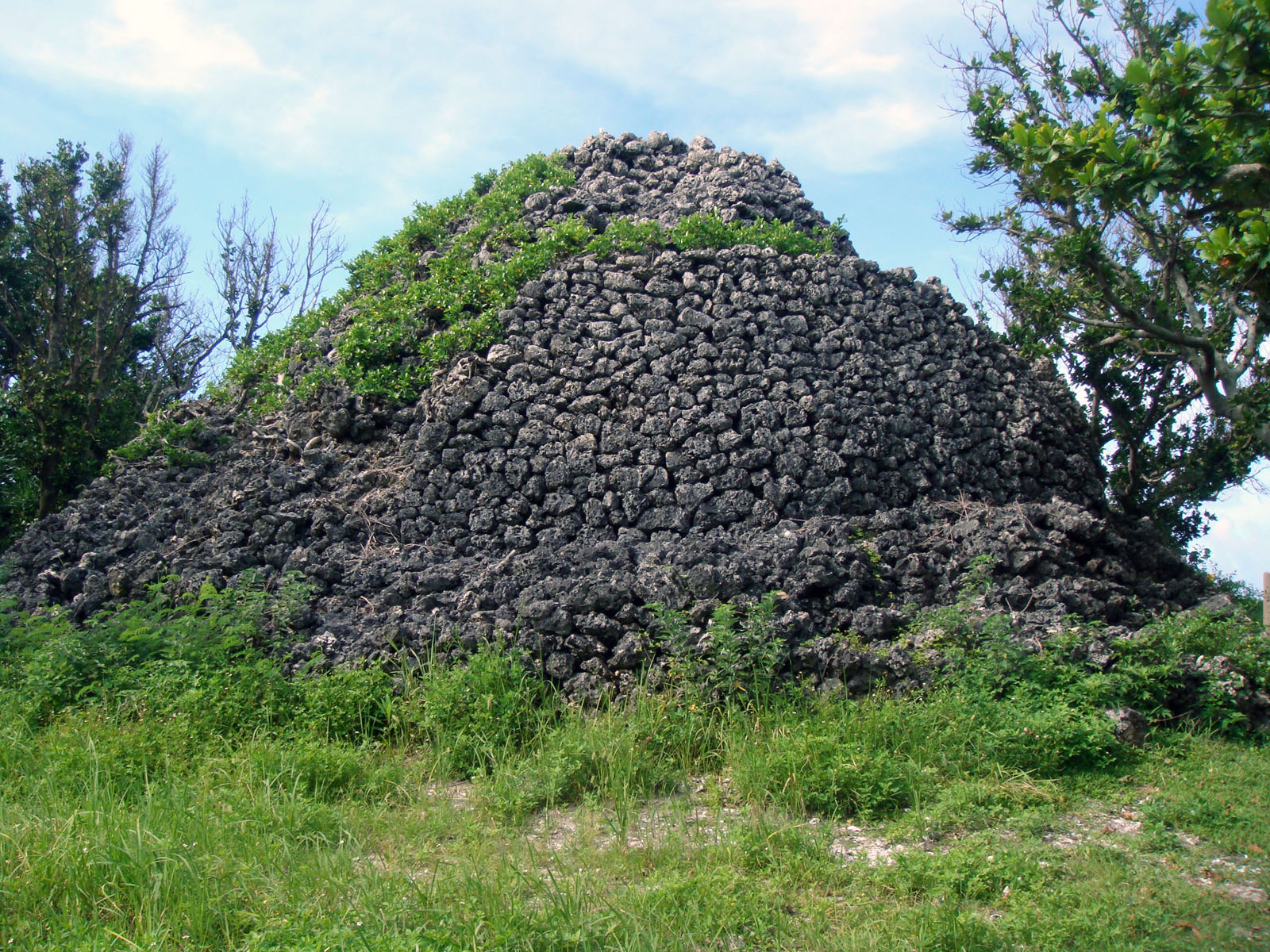
Puzumari Tower

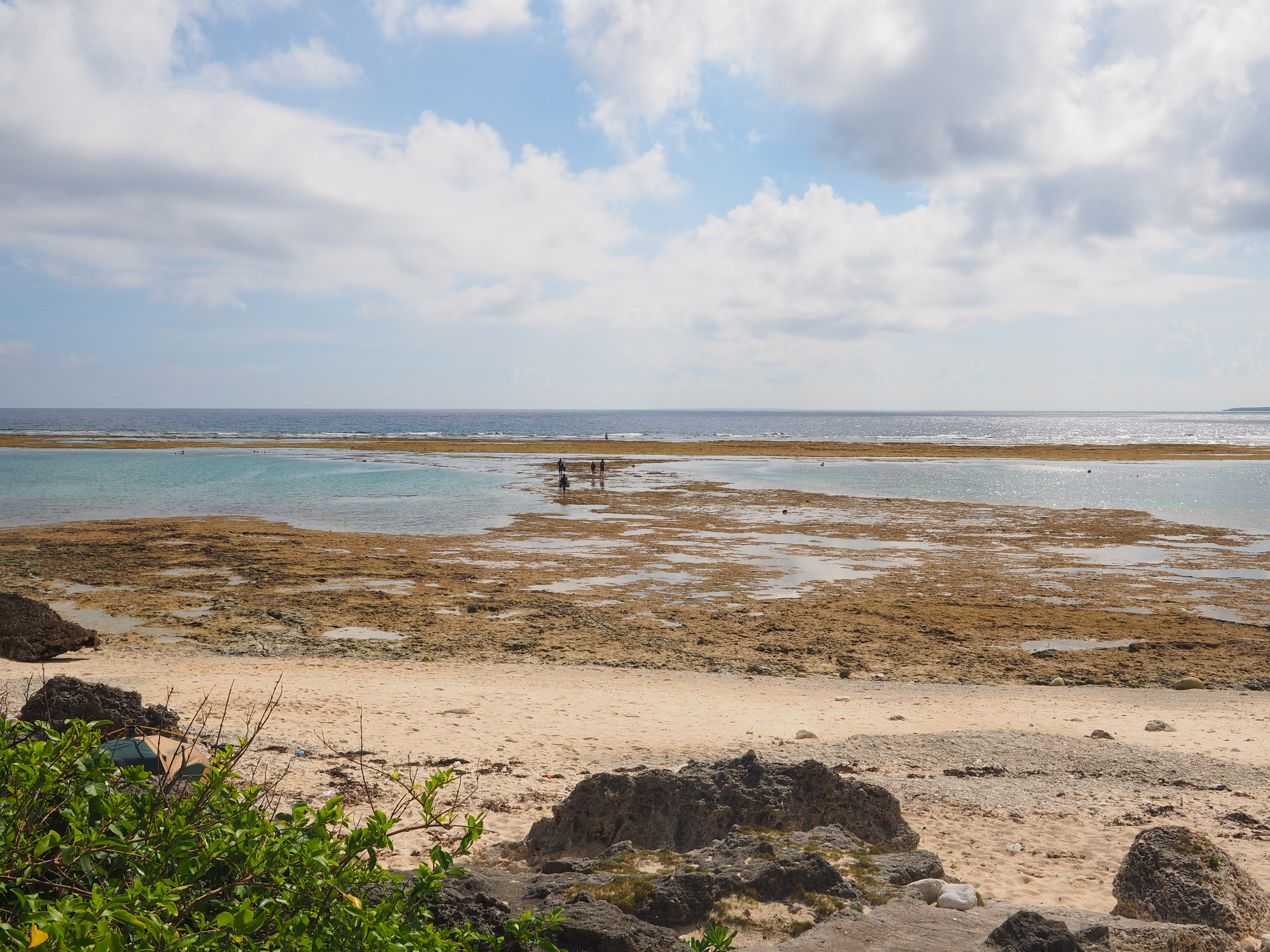
Nakamoto Beach

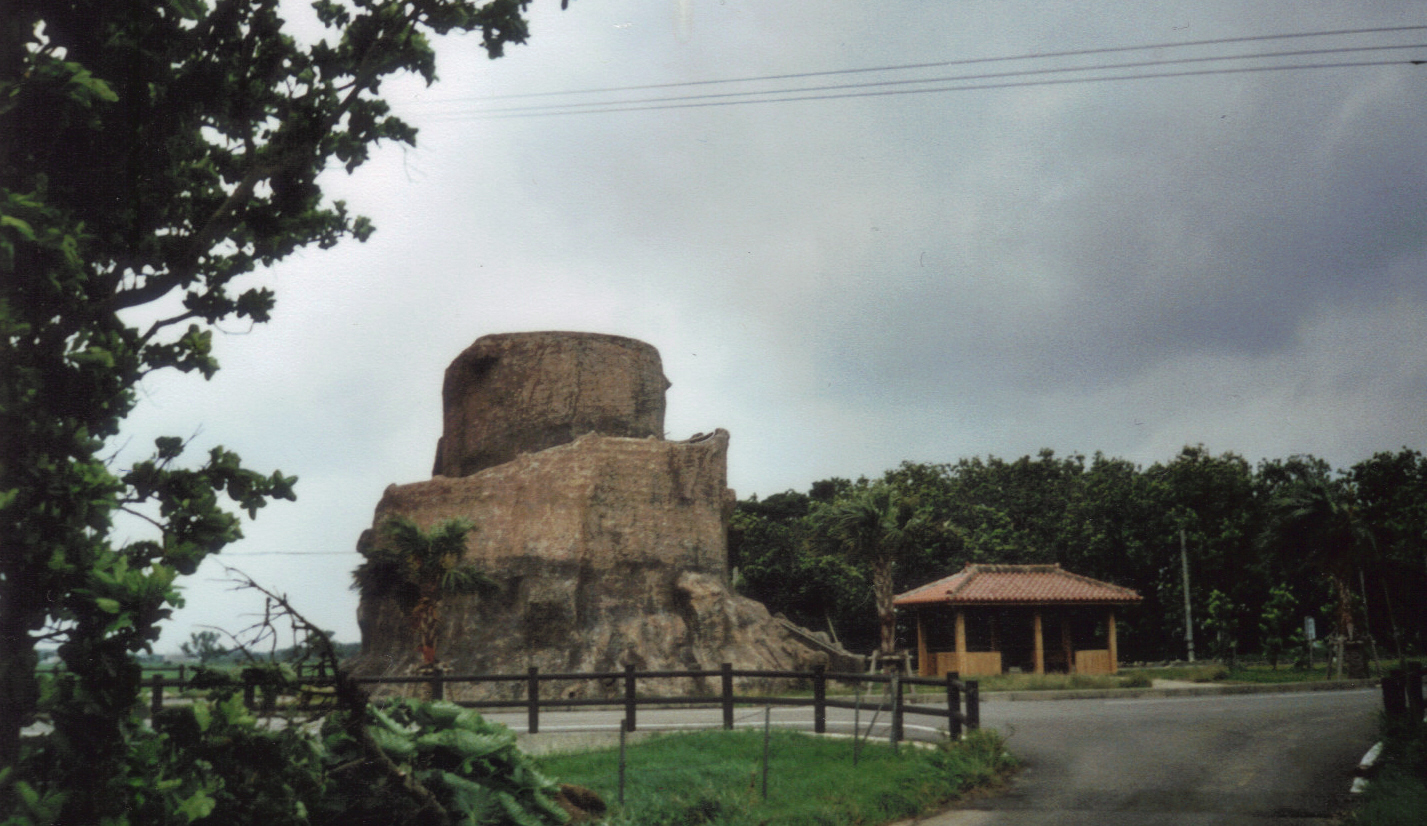
Tower in the middle of the island

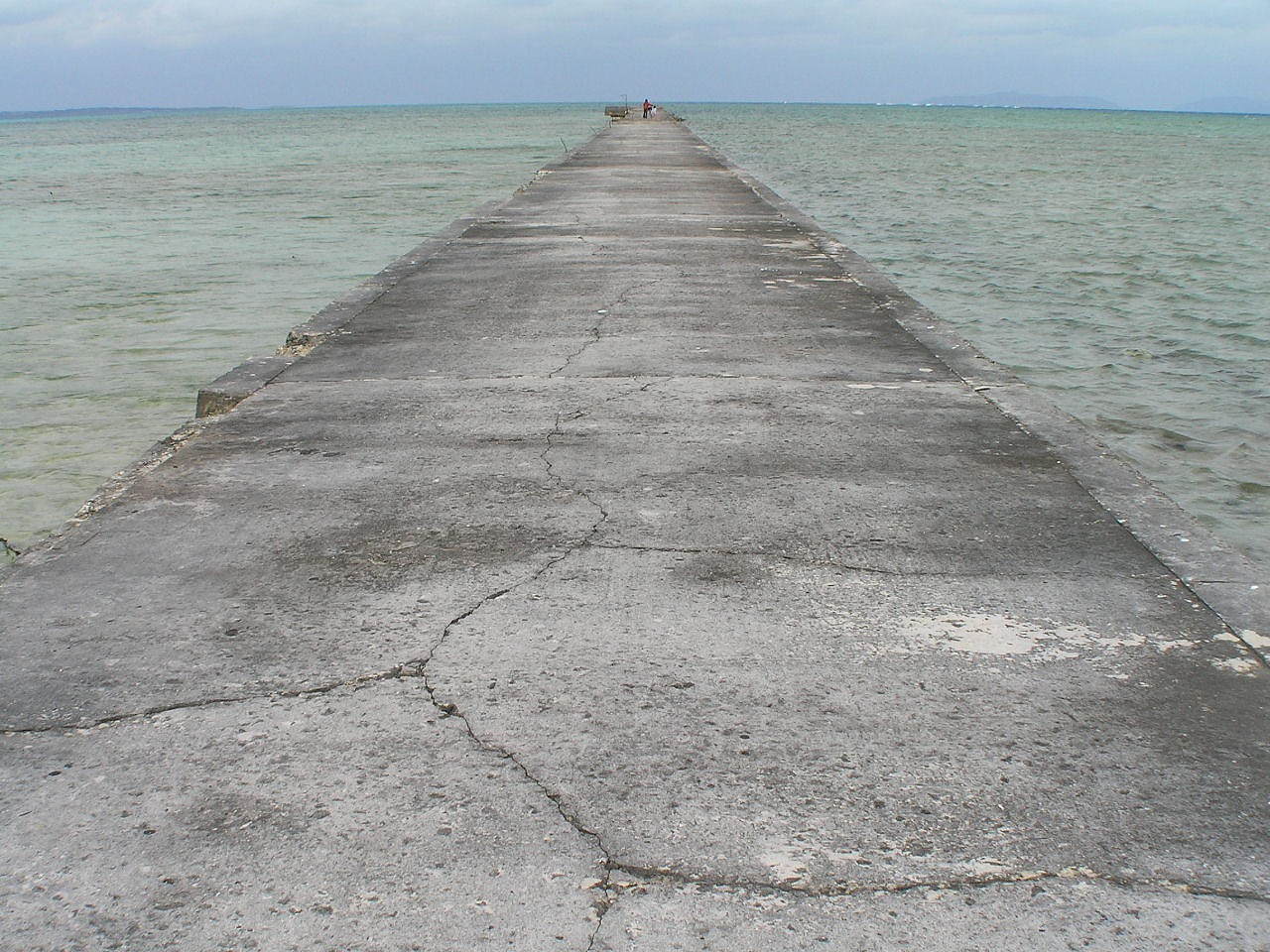
Iko Pier

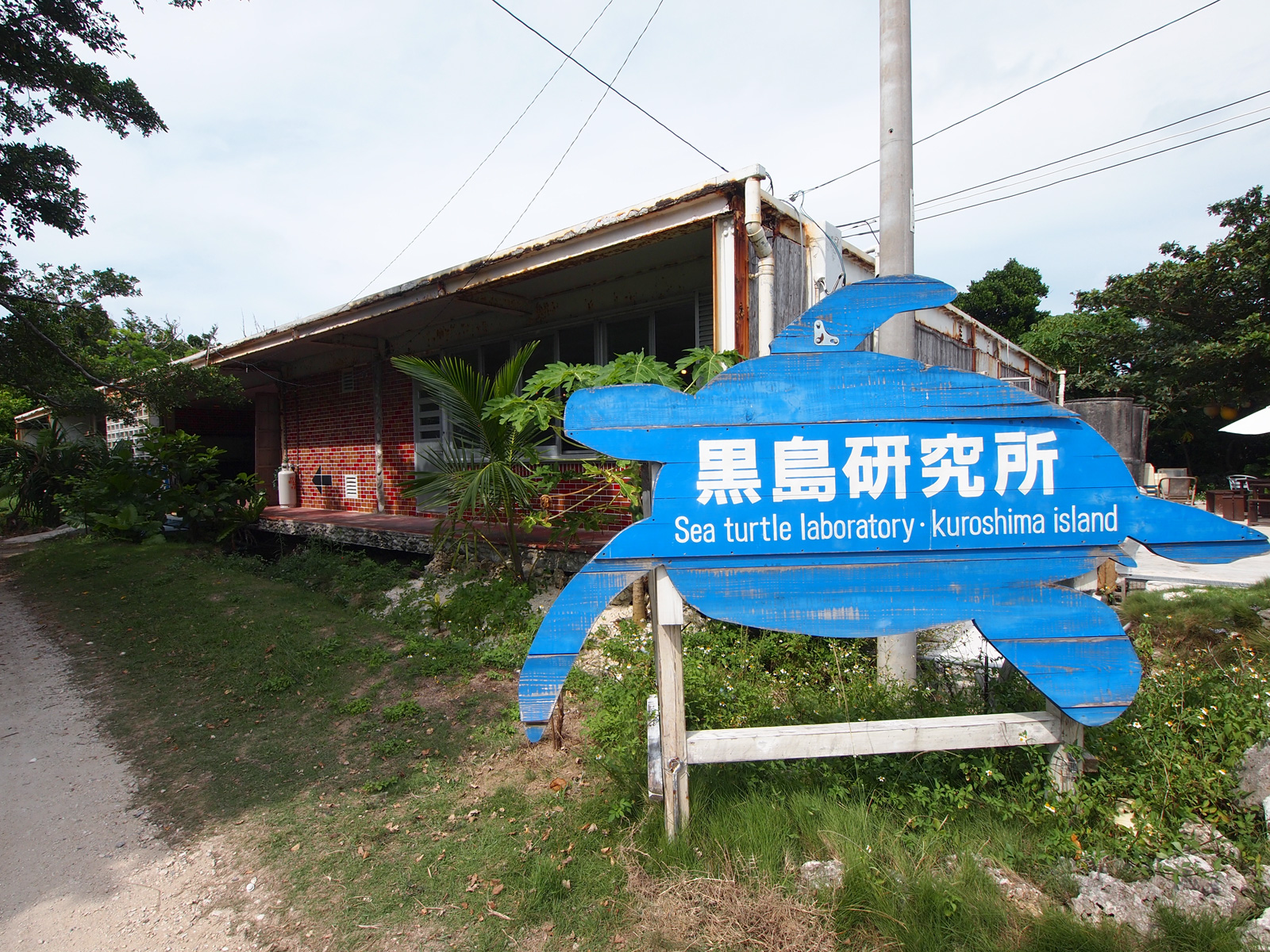
Kuroshima Research Station

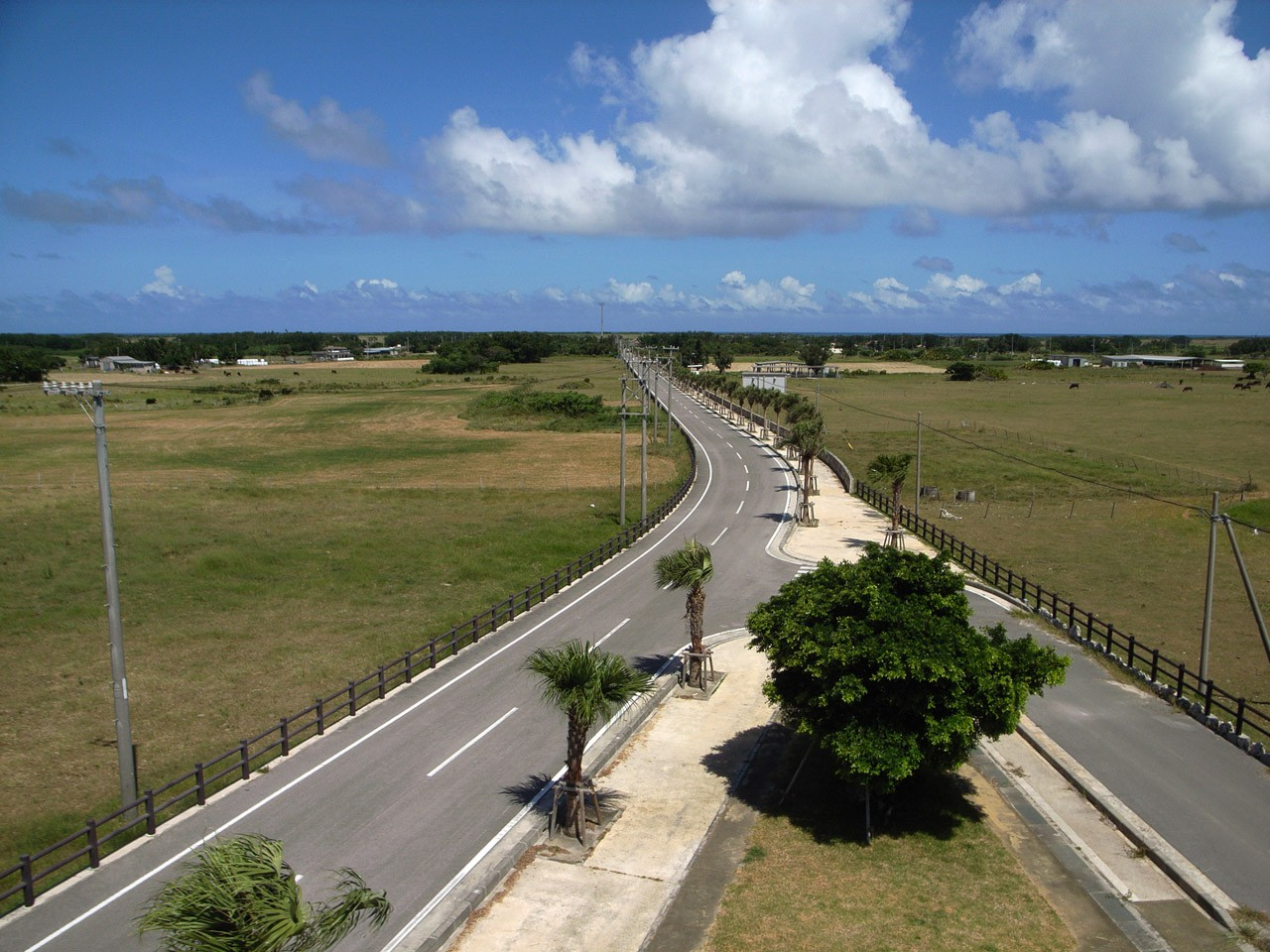
Typical landscape

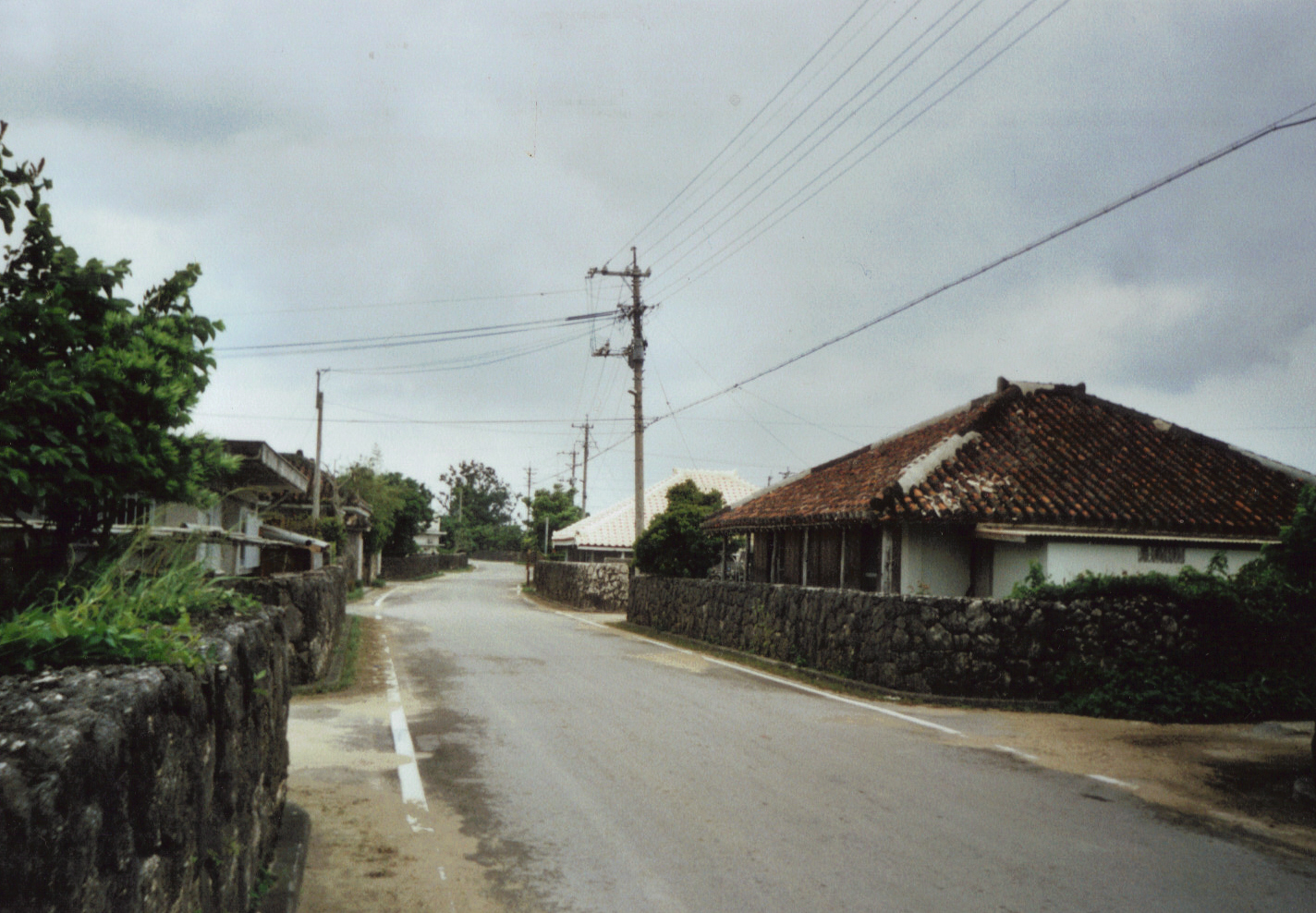
Main Street of Agarisuji Village
