= Aragusuku Islands =

Pair of islands in Okinawa, Japan

パナリ
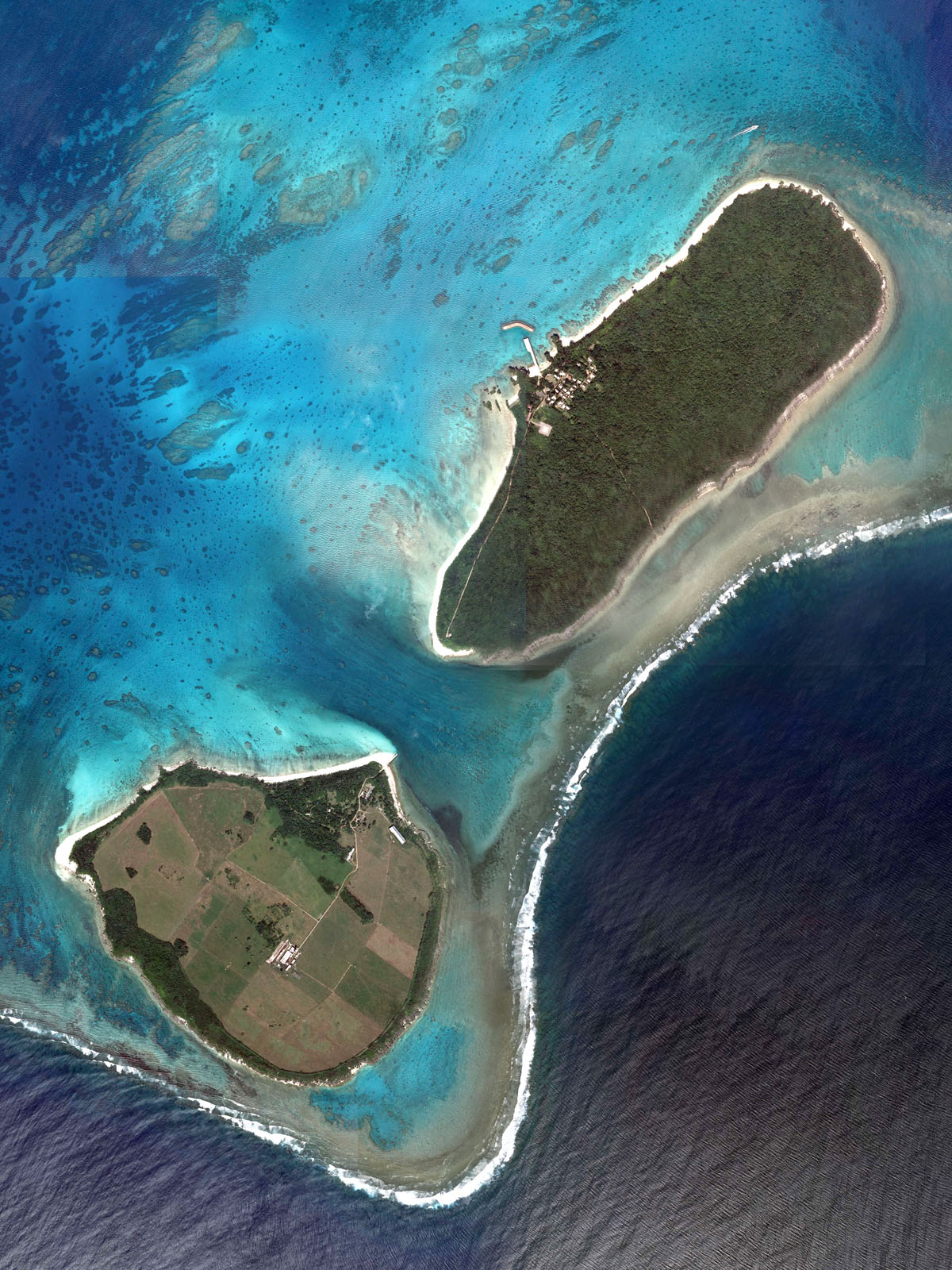
- Interactive map of Aragusuku Islands

Geography
- Coordinates: 24°13′05″N 123°55′53″E
- Archipelago: Ryukyu Islands

Administration
- Japan
- Okinawa Prefecture
- Taketomi

Demographics
- Population: 15
- Ethnic groups: Ryukyuan, Japanese

The Aragusuku Islands (Japanese: 新城島, Aragusuku-jima, Yaeyama: パナリ, Panari) consist of two smaller islets, named Kamiji and Shimoji. They are located in the Yaeyama Islands of Okinawa Prefecture, Japan.

Aragusuku has a population of 15, all of them living on Kamiji. Shimoji is used as a pasture for cattle. Aragusuku is administered by the town of Taketomi on nearby Iriomote. The island can be accessed via tours.

== History ==
The Aragusuku Islands used to be a part of the Ryukyu Kingdom until 1879. During the Ryukyuan era, the islands had as many as 700 people. After World War II, the islands were administered by the United States Civil Administration of the Ryukyu Islands before being returned to Japan in 1972, along with the rest of Okinawa.

== Culture ==
The Aragusuku Islands, like Hamahiga, is known for its preservation of traditional lifestyles. Among locals, the island is referred to as "パナリ (Panari)", meaning "separated" in the Aragusuku dialect of the Yaeyama language.

== See also ==
- Ryukyu Islands
- Yaeyama Islands
