= Taketomi Island =

Island within Ryukyu Islands

Coordinates: 24°20′N 124°05′E

Native name: Taketomi-jima (竹富島)
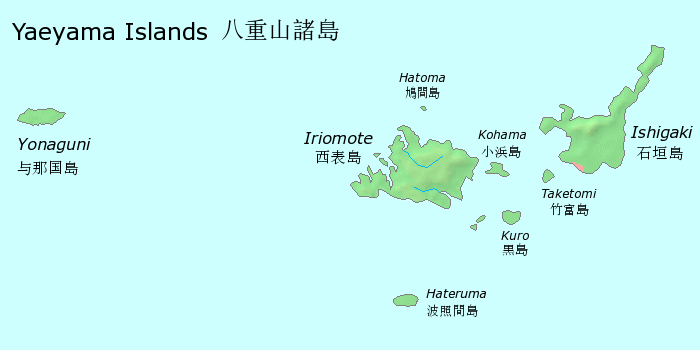
- Taketomi Island is located to the southwest of Ishigaki Island

- Location within Japan

Geography
- Location: Pacific Ocean
- Archipelago: Ryukyu Islands (Yaeyama Islands)
- Area: 5.42 km^{2} (2.09 sq mi)
- Length: 3.4 km (2.11 mi)
- Width: 2.7 km (1.68 mi)
- Highest elevation: 21 m (69 ft)

Administration
- Japan
- Prefecture: Okinawa Prefecture
- District: Yaeyama District
- Town: Taketomi

Demographics
- Population: 323 (January 2012)
- Ethnic groups: Ryukyuan, Japanese

Additional information
- Official website: http://www.taketomi-islands.jp/

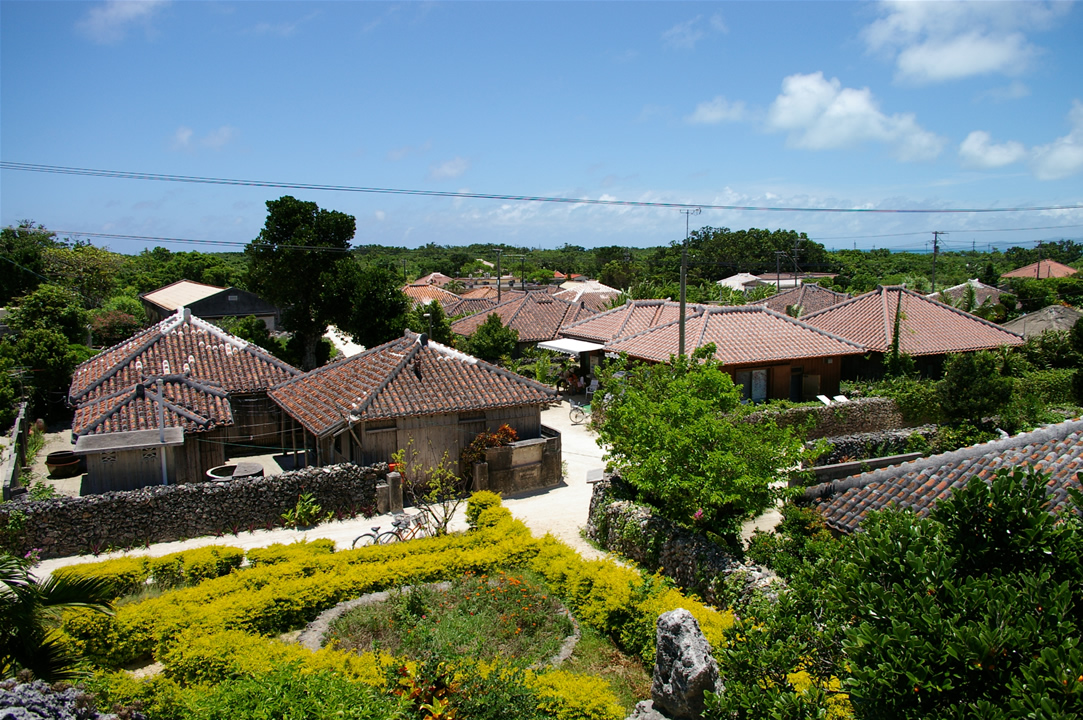
Traditional houses on Taketomi

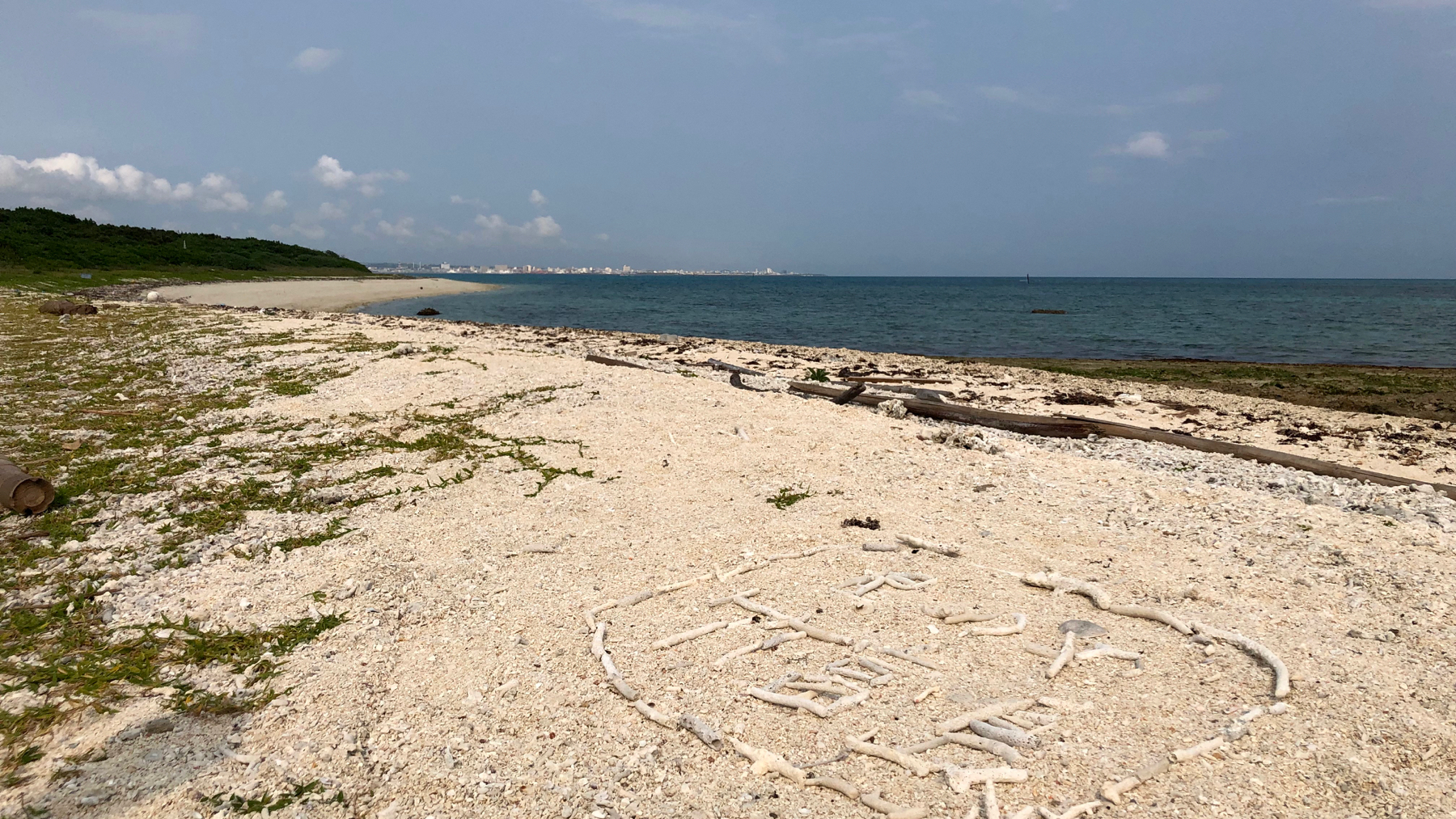
Ishigaki viewed from Taketomi

Taketomi Island (竹富島, Taketomi-jima; Yaeyama: Takidun; Taketomi dialect: Teedun; Okinawan: Dakidun) is an island in the town of Taketomi, within Yaeyama District of Okinawa Prefecture, Japan. Taketomi is one of the Yaeyama Islands. The population of Taketomi Island was 323 as of January 2012.

== Geography ==
Taketomi Island is located 4 kilometres (2.5 mi) south of Ishigaki Island. The island has a village in the center. The island covers 5.42 square kilometres (2.09 mi^{2}), and runs 2.7 kilometres (1.7 mi) east to west and 3.4 kilometres (2.1 mi) north to south. Taketomi is a raised coral atoll. The island is circular in shape, and is surrounded by coral reefs. Taketomi Island is part of Iriomote-Ishigaki National Park, established in 1972.

Taketomi is known for its "traditional Okinawan" houses, stone walls, and sandy streets, making it popular with tourists. Various rules are in place to prevent the more aesthetically displeasing aspects of modern construction from ruining the beauty of the island, such as replacing hand-packed stone with concrete walls. Popular tourist activities include relaxing at the beach, snorkeling, taking an ox-cart ride through the village, and simply walking or biking around the island while enjoying the quaintness of the village and the natural scenery.

It is recognized by academics that Taketomi's "traditional" roofs are a modern product. Today Taketomi's houses are known for visually appealing red-tiled roofs. However, commoners were prohibited from building houses with roof tiles by Ryūkyū Kingdom on Okinawa until its abolishment. The red-roofed house first appeared on Taketomi Island in 1905 and remained a symbol of wealth for decades. As late as in 1964, truly traditional thatched houses accounted for 40% of Taketomi's houses. Red-tiled roofs spread in parallel with the conservation movement.

The island is also famous for its beautiful beaches and hoshizuna or hoshisuna, meaning "star-sand", which is composed of the remains of Foraminifera.

== Economy ==
The principal industries of Taketomi Island are tourism and the production of sugarcane.

== Transportation ==
Taketomi Island is accessible by a ten-minute boat ride from Ishigaki Island. All areas of the island are within walking distance. There are also various places to rent bicycles in the village.

== Education ==
The Taketomi town authorities maintain a single combined elementary and junior high school on the island: Taketomi Elementary and Junior High School (竹富町立竹富小中学校).

For public senior high school students may attend schools of the Okinawa Prefectural Board of Education.

== See also ==
- Groups of Traditional Buildings
- Taketomi travel guide from Wikivoyage
