= Okinawa Prefectural Board of Education =

Education agency of Okinawa Prefecture

The Okinawa Prefectural Board of Education (沖縄県教育委員会) is the prefectural education agency of Okinawa Prefecture in Japan.

The board oversees municipal school districts in Okinawa and directly operates many high schools.

== Schools directly operated by the agency ==
=== Okinawa Island ===
==== Ginowan ====
- Futenma High School
- Ginowan High School
- Chubu Commercial High School

==== Itoman ====
- Itoman High School
- Okisui High School

==== Kunigami District ====
- Ginoza High School (Ginoza)
- Hentona High School (Ogimi)
- Hokuzan High School (Nakijin)
- Motobu High School (Motobu)

==== Nago ====
- Nago High School
- Hokubu Agricultural High School
- Nago Technical High School

==== Naha ====
- Mawashi High School
- Naha High School
- Naha West High School
- Naha Oroku High School
- Shuri High School
- Shuri East High School
- Tomari High School
- Naha International High School
- Okinawa Technical High School
- Naha Commercial High School

==== Nakagami District ====
- Chatan High School (Chatan)
- Kadena High School (Kadena)
- Kitanakagusuku High School (Kitanakagusuku)
- Nishihara High School (Nishihara)
- Yomitan High School (Yomitan)

==== Okinawa ====
- Koza High School
- Kyuyo High School
- Misato High School
- Misato Technical High School
- Mirai Technical High School

==== Shimajiri District ====
- Chinen High School (Yonabaru)
- Haebaru High School (Haebaru)
- Kaiho High School (Haebaru)
- Koyo High School (Yaese)
- Nanbu Technical High School (Yaese)
- Nanbu Commercial High School (Yaese)

==== Tomigusuku ====
- Tominan High School
- Tomishiro High School
- Nanbu Agricultural High School

==== Urasoe ====
- Urasoe High School
- Yomei High School
- Naha Technical High School
- Urasoe Technical High School
- Urasoe Commercial High School

==== Uruma ====
- Ishikawa High School
- Maekawa High School
- Ushikawa High School
- Yokatsu High School
- Chubu Agricultural High School
- Gushikawa Commercial High School

=== Ishigaki ===
==== Ishigaki ====
- Yaeyama High School
- Yaeyama Agricultural High School
- Yaeyama Technical High School

=== Kumejima ===
==== Shimajiri District ====
- Kumejima High School (Kumejima)

=== Miyako-jima ===
==== Miyakojima ====
- Miyako High School
- Shonan High School
- Miyako Agricultural High School
- Miyako Technical High School

=== Irabu ===
==== Miyakojima ====
- Irabu High School

== See also ==
- Department of Defense Education Activity - Operates public high schools for American citizen children who are dependents of U.S. military personnel in Okinawa.
