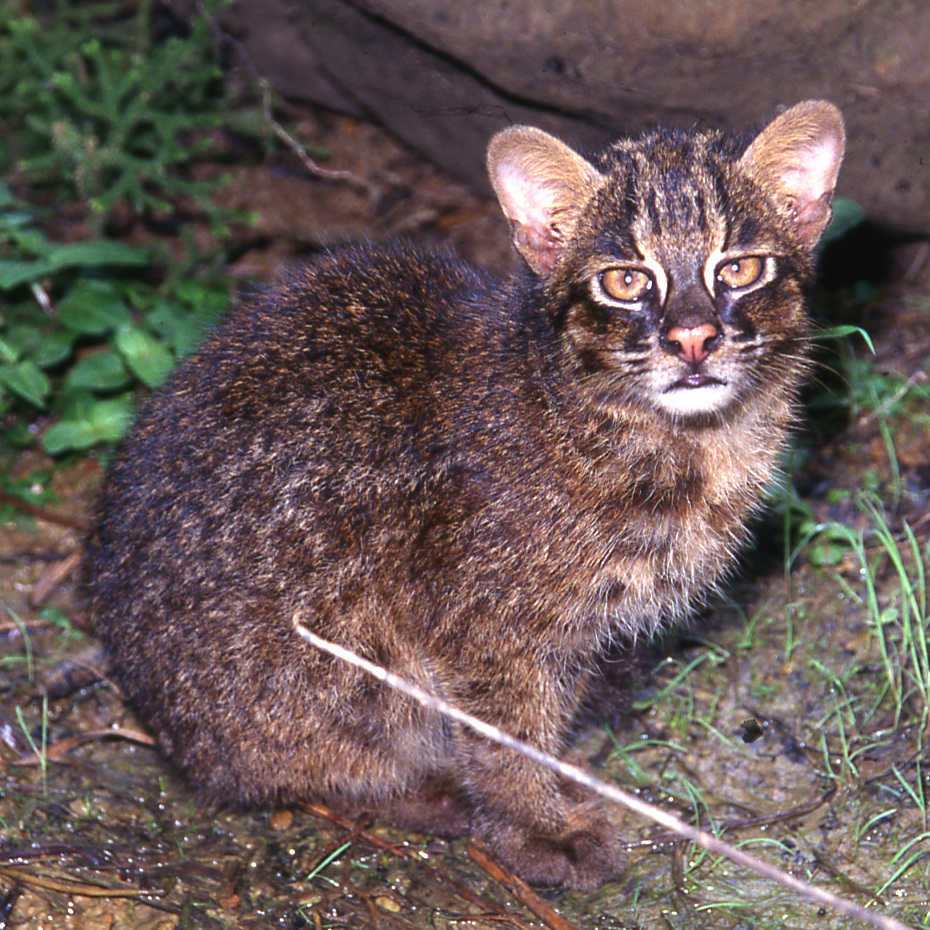
- Iriomote cat

Conservation status
- Critically Endangered (IUCN 3.1)

Scientific classification
- Kingdom: Animalia
- Phylum: Chordata
- Class: Mammalia
- Order: Carnivora
- Family: Felidae
- Genus: Prionailurus
- Species: P. bengalensis
- Subspecies: P. b. iriomotensis

Trinomial name
- Prionailurus bengalensis iriomotensis (Imaizumi, 1967)
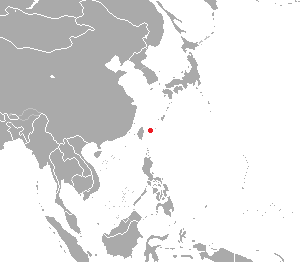
- Iriomote cat range

= Iriomote cat =

Species of small wild cat

The Iriomote cat (Prionailurus bengalensis iriomotensis) is a subspecies of the leopard cat that lives exclusively on the Japanese island of Iriomote.

It has been listed as critically endangered on the IUCN Red List since 2008, as the only population comprises fewer than 250 adult individuals, and is considered declining. The Japanese Ministry of the Environment estimated in 2007 that 100–109 individuals remained and classified the subspecies as "facing an extremely high risk of extinction in the near future".

In Japanese, the subspecies is called Iriomote-yamaneko (西表山猫, "Iriomote mountain cat"). In local dialects of the Yaeyama language, it is known as yamamayaa (ヤママヤー, "wild cat" or "forest cat"), yamapikaryaa (ヤマピカリャー, "that which shines in the forest"), and meepisukaryaa (メーピスカリャー, "that which has flashing eyes").

== Description ==
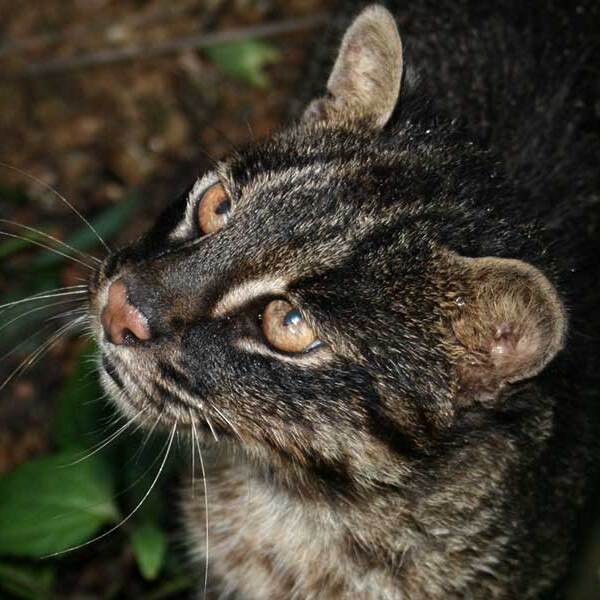
Facial close-up

The fur of the Iriomote cat is mostly dark grey and light brown, with lighter hair on the belly and insides of the limbs. Markings along the jaw are white. The dark parts of the body consist of dark brown to black tabby markings on a lighter brown agouti background. There are two dark brown spots on each cheek. There are 5–7 stripes spanning from the forehead to the back of the head, however, unlike the leopard cat, the stripes stop before reaching the shoulders. Dark brown to black tabby spots cover the flanks of the body, and there are 3–4 bands of irregular stripes on the chest. The tail is dark brown; darker spots pattern the back side of the tail, whilst the underside of the tail is solid. The tip of the tail is dark.

The tips of the ears are rounded, with black hair along the edge. There are no tufts of longer hair on the top of the ears. Adult Iriomote cats have an ocellus (white eye-mimicking spot) on the back of each ear, much like those found on tigers' ears. Young cats lack these marks, and even for adults, the spots will not be as white as those seen on other leopard cat subspecies.

The Iriomote cat's eyes are a light amber colour. The nose is large and flat, with no fur covering the reddish-brown nose leather. The paw ranges from 29–37 mm (1.1–1.5 in) wide, in contrast to the 24–30 mm (0.94–1.18 in) wide paw of a domestic cat.

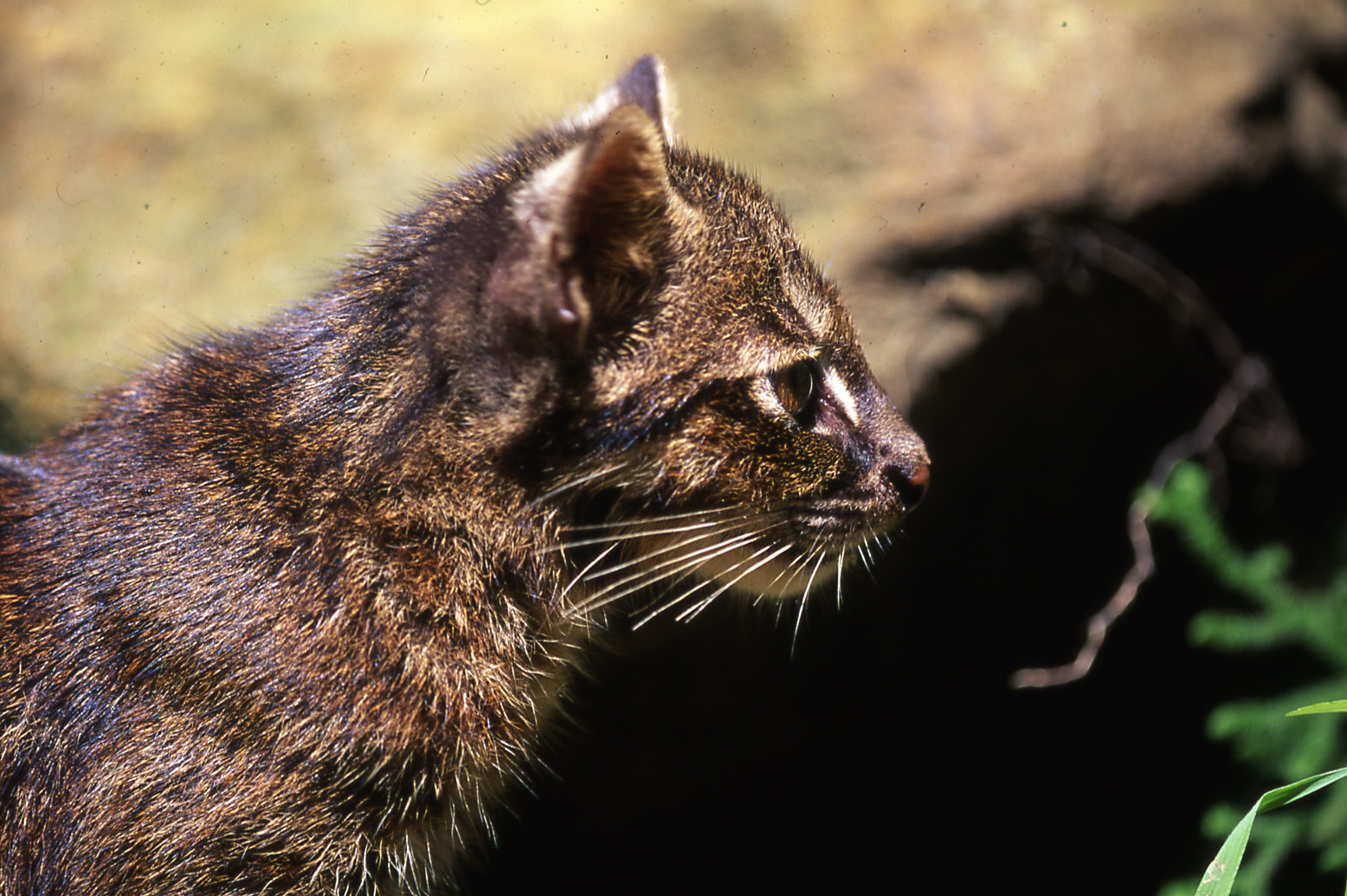
Face profile

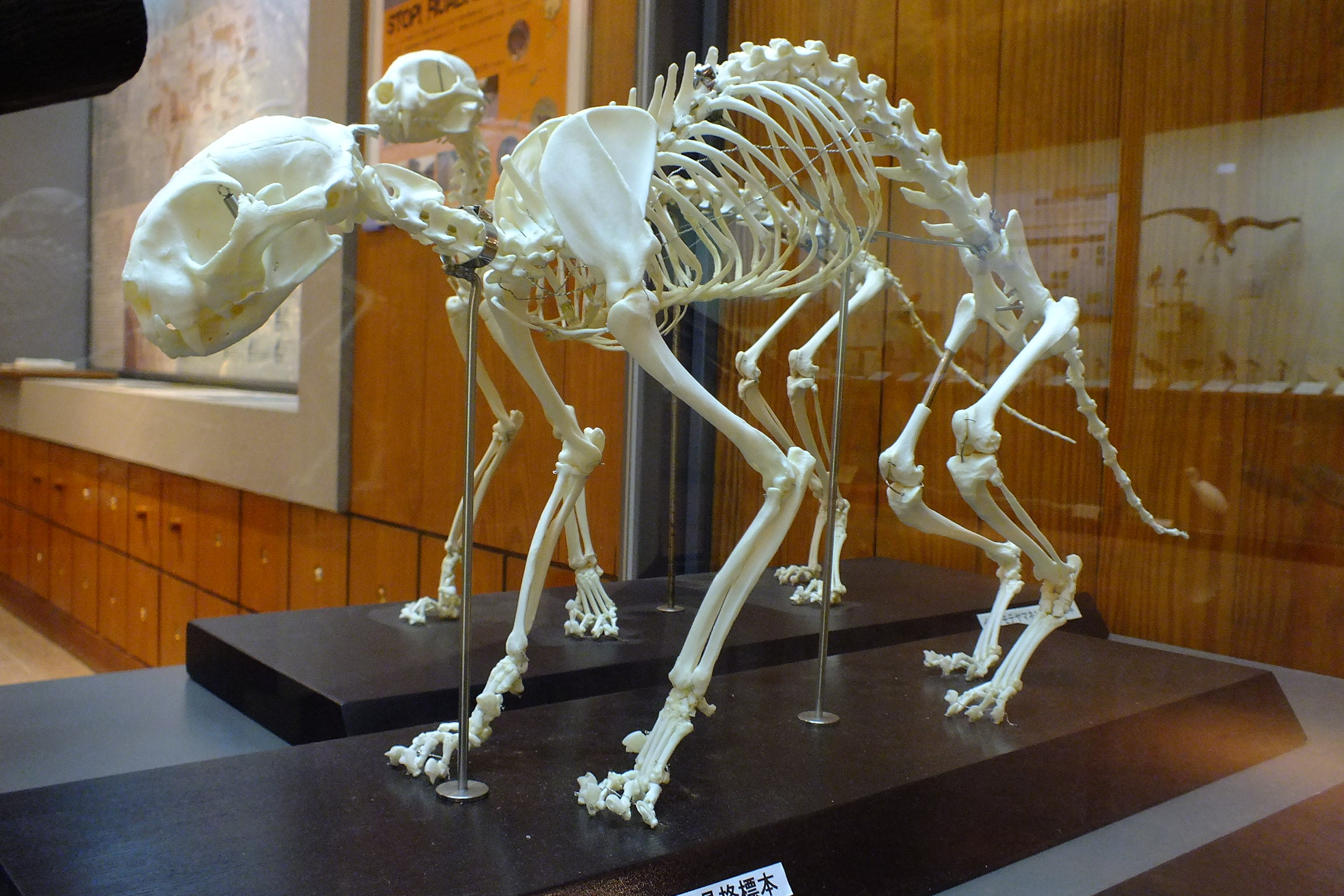
A skeleton of an Iriomote cat at the Iriomote Wildlife Conservation Centre

The skull is longer and narrower than that of a domestic cat. When compared to the leopard cat's skull, the Iriomote cat's is roughly the same size but thicker. Because of this, the Iriomote cat's brain is smaller; a male leopard cat's brain is about 42 grams, whereas a male Iriomote cat's brain is about 30 grams. The occipital bone of the skull and the auditory capsule are not connected. The mandibular symphysis is short.

Male Iriomote cats grow to be 55–60 cm (22–24 in) long and weigh 3.5–5 kg (7.7–11.0 lb). Females are smaller at about 50–55 cm (20–22 in) long and 3–3.5 kg (6.6–7.7 lb). Its tail is thick from base to tip and 23–24 cm (9.1–9.4 in) long. It has a long body and short, thick limbs. Its neck is also thick, and its shoulders are muscular, though its jumping power is relatively weak.

The Iriomote cat has six pairs of incisors, two pairs of canine teeth, four pairs of premolars, and two pairs of molars for a total of 28 teeth. Compared to other cats, including small wild cats, the Iriomote cat is lacking one pair of premolars on the top jaw behind the canines. In addition to this, unlike most other subtropical mammals, Iriomote cats' teeth give details about their year-to-year history. It is expected that these details will help determine the age and behaviour of the cats.

The anal glands of the Iriomote cat surround the anus; this contrasts with other cat species', where they are inside the anus.

== Distribution ==
Map of Iriomote island

The Iriomote cat is endemic to the Japanese Iriomote Island, which spans about 290 km^{2} (110 sq mi). Iriomote consists predominantly of low mountains ranging 300–460 m (980–1,510 ft) in elevation with subtropical evergreen forest, including extensive belts of mangrove along the waterways. It is the smallest habitat of any wild cat species in the world.

The Iriomote cat lives predominantly in the subtropical forests that cover the island up to an elevation of 200 m (660 ft). It prefers areas near rivers, forest edges, and places with low humidity.

== Ecology and behaviour ==
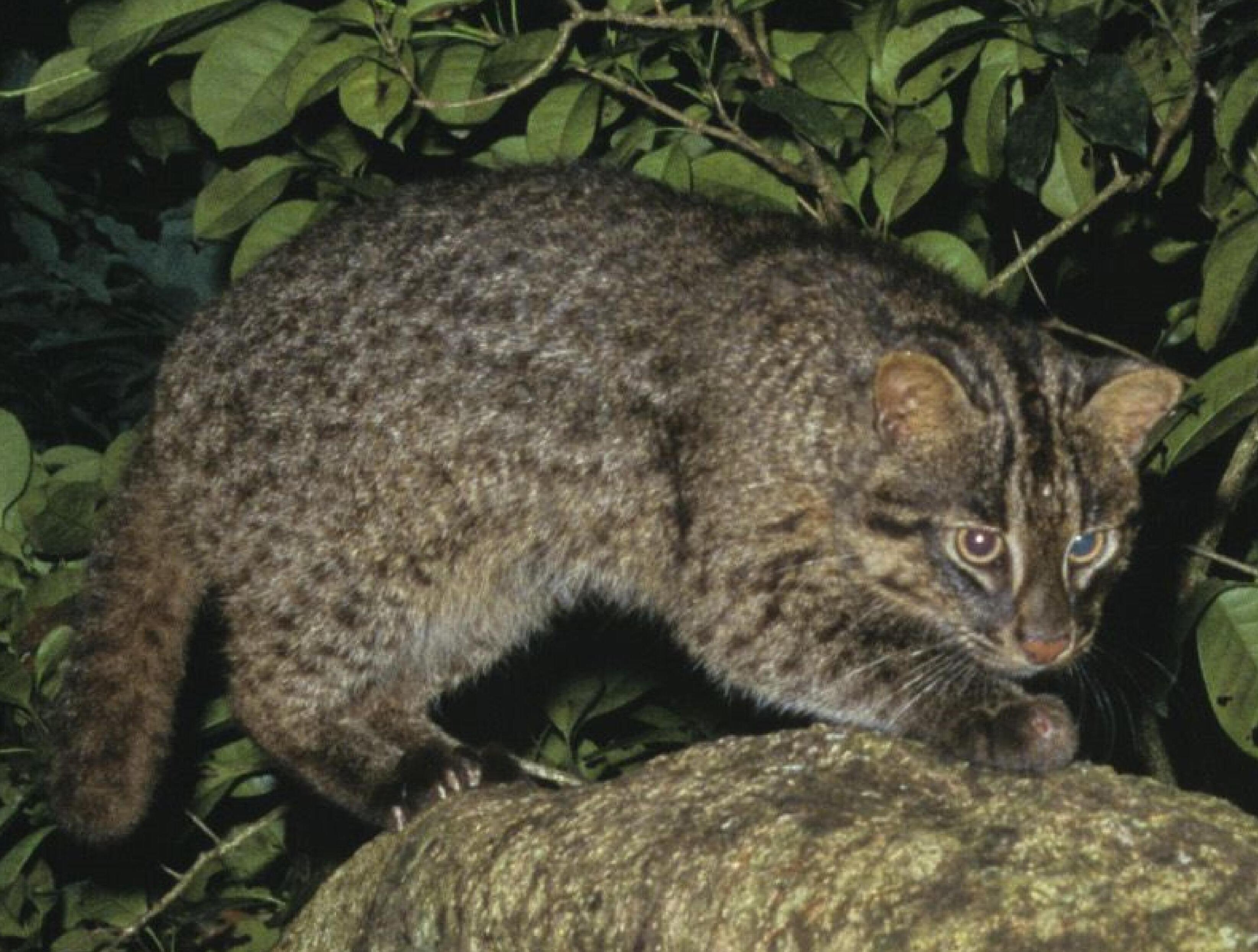
Adult in a tree

(video) Iriomote cat in the wild, 2014

Iriomote cats are terrestrial, but climb trees, go into the water and also swim. They are nocturnal and especially active during twilight hours. During daytime, they sleep in tree hollows or caves. They mark their territory by urinating and defecating on rocks, tree stumps and bushes. Their home ranges vary from 1–7 km^{2} (0.39–2.70 sq mi) in size.

=== Home range ===
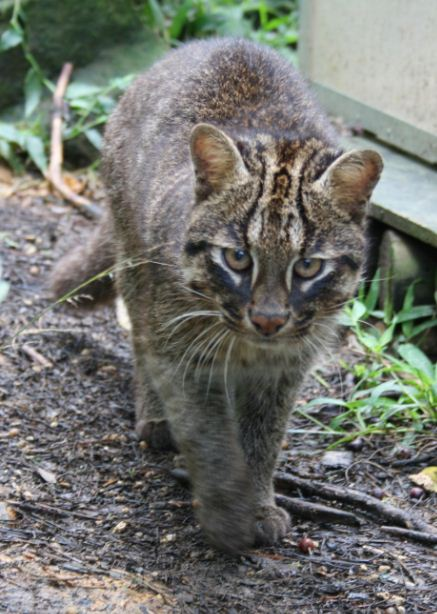
Walking adult

Iriomote cats are usually solitary. Their home range varies seasonally and also individually, and is smaller during the mating season. In 1998 and 1999, a male and a female Iriomote cat were radio-tracked for 7 to 13 successive days in the western part of the island. Their home ranges overlapped extensively in all periods. The periodical home range of the male was 0.83–1.65 km^{2} (0.32–0.64 sq mi) in size, and the resident female's range was 0.76–1.84 km^{2} (0.29–0.71 sq mi).

Iriomote cats are territorial. Home ranges of males and females overlap, and one to two females live within a male's home range. Typically, home ranges of same sex cats will not overlap, but partial overlaps are seen. Often, these small overlaps are hunting grounds. It is thought that they patrol their territories for three to four days, marking and hunting as they go.

Young males and some adult cats are transient, i.e. wandering over the island and waiting for an open home range slot that they can occupy by marking this area. Female cats allow their young to stay in their home range and mark a new territory once the next breeding season comes.

=== Diet ===
Iriomote cats are carnivorous and prey on various mammals, birds, reptiles, amphibians, fish, and crustaceans. (Note: It is estimated that water birds comprise about 60% of the cat's diet with black rats being its secondary source of food at about 10–30% of its diet. Based on stool samples, birds represent 60% of their diet, black rats 30%, insects 30%, lizards and frogs about 15–20%, bats 3–17%, and wild pig less than 1%. In addition, fish and crustaceans appear roughly 3–4% of the time.) They typically ingest 400–600 g (14–21 oz) of food a day. Other wild cats primarily hunt small mammals, such as rodents and rabbits, but because there are no other carnivores to compete with the Iriomote cat on the island, there is no need for them to isolate themselves from the various habitats and food sources that are available. Thus, their diet is quite varied.

Mammalian prey includes black rats, Ryukyu flying foxes and young Ryukyu wild boar. Their prey also includes a wide range of birds, such as the Eastern spot-billed duck, slaty-legged crake, Eurasian scops-owl, pale thrush, and white-breasted waterhen. Reptiles include various types of snakes and Kishinoue's giant skink. They are also known to hunt Sakishima rice frogs, yellow-spotted crickets and crabs. As their hunting grounds tend to be in swamps or on shores, they sometimes swim and dive to catch water birds, fish, and freshwater prawns. Seasonal dietary changes have been observed. They eat rats and frogs year-round, lizards in the summer and spring, and crickets and bats more often in the fall and winter.

When eating birds that are larger than a dusky thrush, most cat species will pluck the feathers and then eat them, but the Iriomote cat will eat even large birds whole, without removing the feathers. Furthermore, unlike other cats, the Iriomote cat does not kill its prey immediately by breaking the spinal cord. Instead, it holds the animal in its mouth until it stops moving.

=== Reproductive behaviour ===
During the mating season, Iriomote cats become active during the day as well. Breeding females are more active than non-breeding ones during the late night and morning hours. Outside the mating season the cats live in solitude, but when they begin breeding, they live together. The mating season lasts from December to March, and females go into heat several times during this period, with the peak being in January and February. In late February, a fasting period lasting approximately two weeks occurs. This time frame is notable, as it coincides with a peak in sexual excitement among females. Male and female cats always stay together at this time, and it is thought that conception happens during these two weeks.

Between April and June, pregnant female cats give birth to 1–3 kittens in a tree hollow or cavern. The locations chosen for birthing and rearing are dry and have good ventilation. Kittens stay with their mother for about eleven months. They begin to become more independent during the fall and winter months. They stay in their mother's home range from anywhere between a few months and years. Kittens reach maturity at twenty months after birth.

=== Lifespan ===
It is estimated that Iriomote cats live for seven to eight years in the wild, and eight to nine years in captivity. Human influences, traffic accidents and traps may lower their lifespan to two to five years. In captivity, an Iriomote cat lived for an estimated 15 years and one month, the longest known lifespan of any Iriomote cat.

== Discovery ==
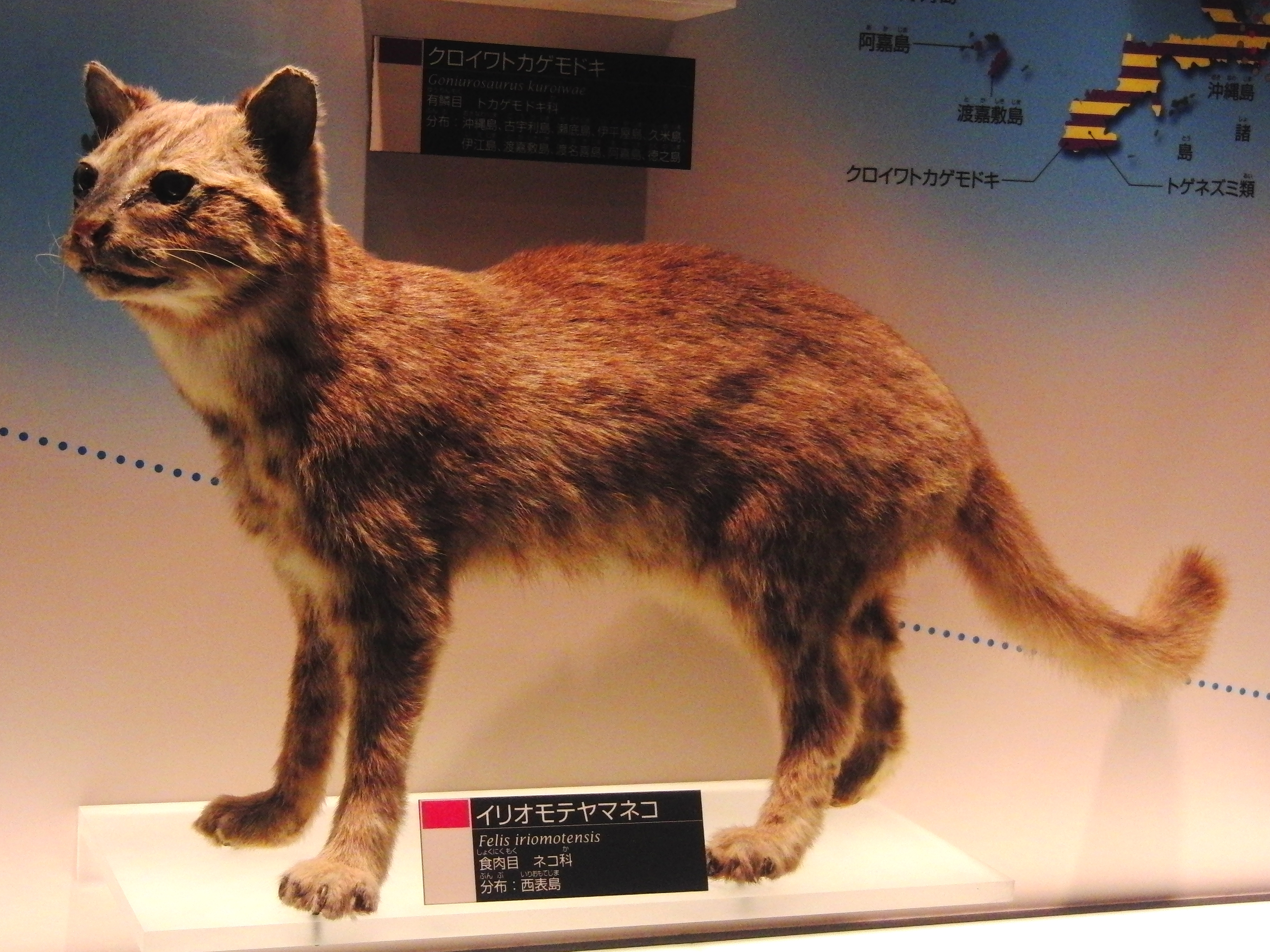
A taxidermy specimen at the National Museum of Nature and Science in Tokyo

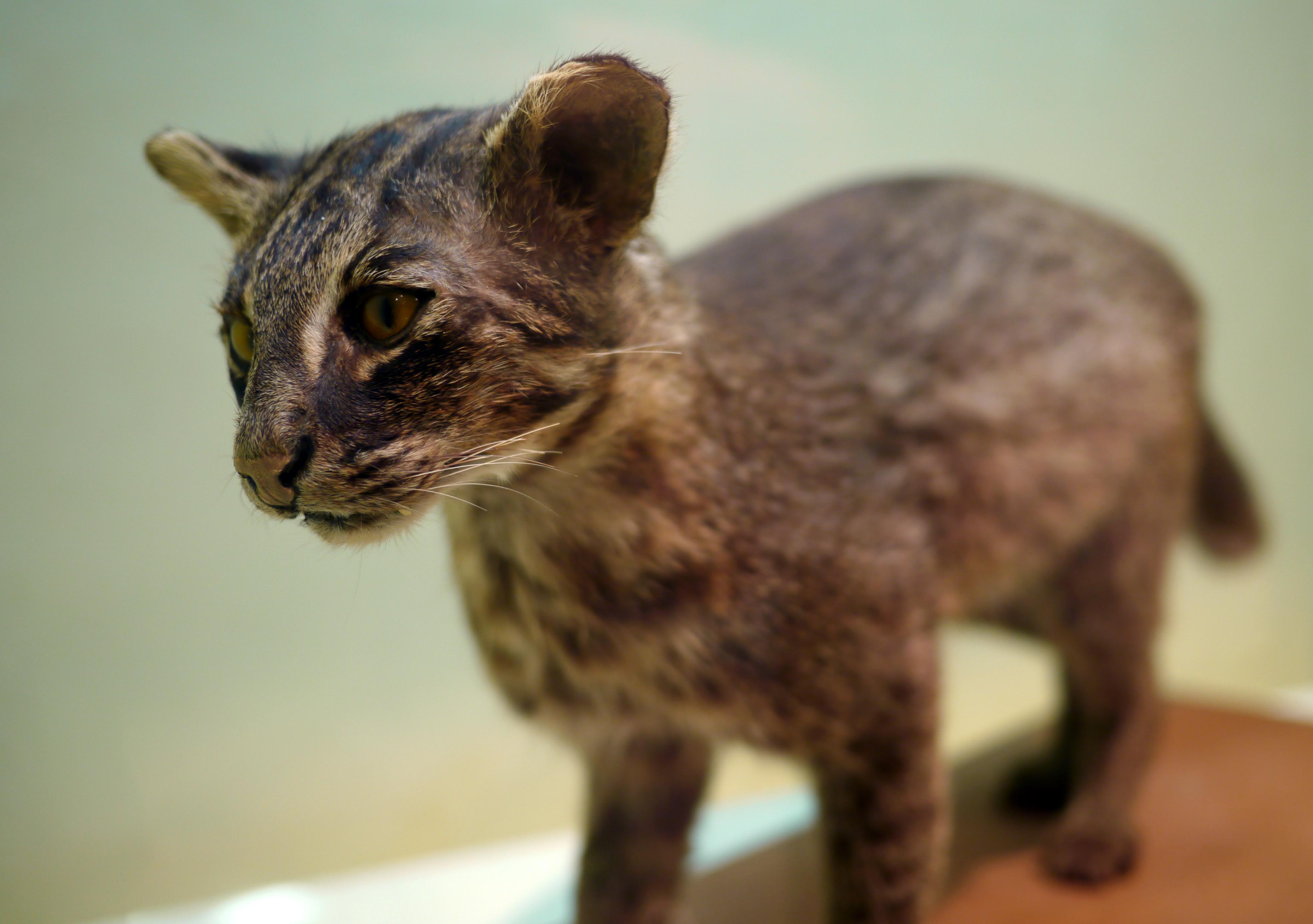
A taxidermied Iriomote cat at the Iriomote Wildlife Conservation Centre

The Iriomote cat was discovered in 1965 by Yukio Togawa (戸川幸夫, Togawa Yukio), an author who specialised in works about animals. In 1967, it was first described by Yoshinori Imaizumi, director of the zoological department of the National Museum of Nature and Science in Tokyo.

Prior to its scientific discovery, the Iriomote cat was known locally by various names: yamamayaa (ヤママヤー, "the cat in the mountain"), yamapikaryaa (ヤマピカリャー, "that which shines on the mountain"). To distinguish between the Iriomote cat and other cats on the island, locals also gave other cats nicknames such as pingimaya (ピンギマヤ) for stray cats and maya (マヤ) or mayagwaa (マヤグヮー) for house cats. Others, however, believed that the Iriomote cat was a feral cat.

=== Prior to specimen acquisition ===
Based on information from local people, Tetsuo Koura (高良鉄夫, Koura Tetsuo) from the University of the Ryukyus was able to capture a kitten in 1962, but did not get an adult specimen. In 1964, Tokio Takano (高野凱夫, Takano Tokio) from the exploration department of Waseda University informed Imaizumi of the rumours of a cat living in the mountains of Iriomote.

In February 1965, Togawa visited the Yaeyama Islands. He had heard in Naha from a newspaper columnist that there were rumours of wild cats living on Iriomote. He at first assumed that, similar to reports of the extinct Japanese wolf, people must have been mistaking escaped and feral house pets for wild animals. He spoke with colleague Tetsuo Koura, who knew of and believed there to be some truth to the rumours. Koura then entrusted Togawa with the task of acquiring evidence. Togawa then travelled to Iriomote to gather information for his own report and to collect information on the Iriomote cat and a specimen.

Upon arriving on the island, Togawa learned that because there wasn't enough food on Iriomote, people would cook Iriomote cats that had been caught and use the meat in soup. Cats caught in traps would also be disposed of, which made acquiring samples difficult.

Following these discoveries, he went to the hamlet of Amitori (網取部落, Amitori Buraku) on the western side of the island. There, a middle school teacher who had worked under Koura said that he had caught one of the cats in a trap set for wild boar. He had sent the skin to Koura, but buried the rest of the body. Togawa dug up the remains and obtained the skull. He also found two faeces samples near the village, and was able to get a skin from a fisherman who lived in Inaba (イナバ部落, Inaba Buraku), a hamlet along Urauchi River.

He returned to Koura and sent the two skins, the faeces, and the skull to Yoshinori Imaizumi at the National Museum of Nature and Science, where The Mammalogical Society of Japan (日本哺乳動物学会, Nihon Honyū Dōbutsu Gakkai) examined the remains. The analysis was performed on 14 March 1965. The results showed the cat to be either a new species or a new subspecies, but there weren't enough samples to confirm. They requested either a complete set of remains or a live specimen. Following the announcement, some members of the society believed the samples to show simple mutations, whilst others believed them to be the remains of wild cats that had previously been brought to and left on the island by foreign ships.

=== Live specimen acquisition to announcement ===
In June 1965, Togawa returned to Iriomote with Koura to obtain a complete set of remains, a live specimen, and information regarding the cat's ecology. They brought box traps and silvervine to aid their efforts in catching a live cat. According to hunters, though, only one or two cats per year were caught, and the number of remaining cats was probably quite low. Togawa did not expect to catch one alive.

In May 1965, prior to Togawa's return to the island, a group of children from Ōhara Elementary School (大原小学校) on a field trip to the southern part of the island found a weakened, injured male Iriomote cat at the base of the small Maaree Waterfall (マーレー滝, Maaree Taki) on Haemita Beach (南風見田の浜, Haemita no Hama). The teacher in charge of the children took the cat. Another teacher preserved the pelt in formalin and buried the skeleton in a wooden box behind the school. Togawa exhumed the remains, and this cat became the prototype for the species. In addition to this example, the scientists also were able to obtain the crushed skull of a kitten from the neighboring Yubu Island that was later reconstructed by Imaizumi.

In addition to researching the Iriomote cat, Togawa also looked into rumours of a larger cat on the island (see #Yamapikaryaa) and conducted an investigation. Before returning to Tokyo, he offered US$100 for any live Iriomote cat and US$30 for dead cats that were brought to him. With the aid of the Taketomi mayor and the Daily Yaeyama Newspaper (八重山毎日新聞, Yaeyama Mainichi Shinbun), he was able to publicise the offer on bulletin boards and in other ways. He also announced rewards for the rumoured large cat on the island: US$200 if brought in alive, US$100 for remains.

Through these offers, he acquired two complete skeletons, two skulls, and three pelts that he brought back with him to Tokyo. One of the pelts was that which the elementary school children helped obtain, and it was confirmed to be that of an Iriomote cat. The sample from Yubu Island was small, and judgment was held back. A sample from Ishigaki Island was discovered to be a house cat.

In January 1966, the body of an Iriomote cat that had been caught in a wild boar trap in the mid-basin of the Nakama River was sent to Koura at the University of the Ryukyus, but there was no more information regarding captures for some time after this. In December 1966, Hiroshi Kuroda (黒田宏, Kuroda Hiroshi), a hunter at the Nakama River's mid-basin, caught a live male cat, but it escaped immediately. He then caught another male cat soon after.

On 15 January 1966, local hunters caught a young female Iriomote cat near Nakama Mountain (仲間山, Nakama-yama). The National Museum of Nature and Science planned on using funds intended for garden repairs to pay for the specimens, but the hunters who caught the cats expected US$1000–3000 per cat. At the persuasion of the director of the District Forestry Office, the hunters accepted an award within the budget as a "daily allowance" or "finder's fee".

During this time, the mayor of Taketomi was making negotiations with the Southern Japan Liaison Offices (南方連絡事務所, Nanpō Renraku Jimusho) and the Ryukyu government. He travelled to Naha for these discussions, which covered the possibility of offering the two captured Iriomote cats to the emperor with the stated purpose of increasing national knowledge about Iriomote and for the promotion of industrial development on the island. At the same time, the Taketomi town offices, under the premise of obtaining permission from the Ryukyu government to keep the cats, confiscated samples from the staff of the National Museum of Nature and Science and brought them back to their offices.

With Togawa pressuring the newspapers and Yoshinori Imaizumi urging the Ryukyuan government and Southern Japan Liaison Offices through the Ministry of Education, the Southern Japan Liaison Offices denied the possibility of giving the cats to the emperor, and the Ryukyuan government persuaded the mayor not to follow through with his plans. Finally, the specimens were delivered to the museum.

The cats arrived at Haneda airport in March 1967. Yoshinori Imaizumi kept them shortly until Togawa, having been entrusted by the museum to observe them, took charge of them for about two years. The cats were then transferred to the museum for monitoring. The male died on 25 April 1973, and the female on 13 December 1975. The male's pelt was temporarily stuffed, the blood was sent off for chromosomal research, and the rest of the body was preserved in formaldehyde. The female was stuffed and put on display in the museum.

In May 1967, The Mammalogical Society of Japan issued their third and fourth issues, announcing in English the discovery of a new genus of cat that was closely related to the primitive cat genus Metailurus. The former genus name of Mayailurus stems from the word used for "cat" on Iriomote, maya-, while -ailurus comes from Ancient Greek and also means "cat". The subspecies name of iriomotensis means "from Iriomote". The Japanese name of Togawa mountain cat (トガワヤマネコ, Togawa-yamaneko) was proposed by Yoshinori Imaizumi, in honour of Togawa, who discovered the species, but Togawa turned down the request and instead supported the name Iriomote cat (イリオモテヤマネコ, Iriomote-yamaneko) based on the Tsushima cat, which was also named after the location at which it was discovered. Koura agreed with Togawa, thus officiating the name.

== Classification and genealogy ==
Mayailurus iriomotensis was the scientific name proposed by Yoshinori Imaizumi (今泉吉典, Imaizumi Yoshinori) in 1967 for the Iriomote cat. Imaizumi pointed out that, compared to other leopard cats, the Iriomote cat retained some especially primitive features. Judging from these characteristics, he estimated that the Iriomote cat evolved as a species sometime between ten million years ago in the Miocene epoch and three million years ago during the Pliocene epoch. He also thought that they shared many primitive characteristics with fossils of the extinct genus Metailurus. He emphasised these points, stating that the Iriomote cat and Metailurus shared a common ancestor sometime between ten and five million years ago, and from that he deducted that the Iriomote cat's ancestors must have widened its range from mainland Asia to Iriomote and other areas beginning three million years ago. It appears to be a very ancient species, a 'missing link', more closely related to Pardofelis and Profelis than any other extant species of Prionailurus.

In contrast to Imaizumi's assertions about its unique characteristics, other researchers strongly disputed the idea that the Iriomote cat is its own species ever since its discovery. Investigations involving skulls and teeth, samples and living animals, and genetic research were conducted. Because of these study results, it was subordinated under the genus Prionailurus as Prionailurus iriomotensis in 2005.

The Iriomote cat's karyotype, the restriction fragment length of the ribosomal RNA (rRNA), and molecular phylogenetic analyses of the mitochondrial 12S rRNA and cytochrome b have proven to be identical, or nearly so, to the leopard cat's. The two cats are assumed to be extremely closely related, their differences being categorised as either intraspecies variations or individual mutations. Also, from the speed of cytochrome b's base-pair substitution and its diversity, it is estimated that the Iriomote cat diverged from the leopard cat around 180,000-200,000 years ago. According to marine geologists, the Ryukyu Islands were connected to mainland Asia via a land bridge from about 20,000 to 240,000 years ago. Scientists believe that the Iriomote cat moved its range to the islands during this period. Because of this, it is assumed that there is little genetic variety within the species.

== Threats ==
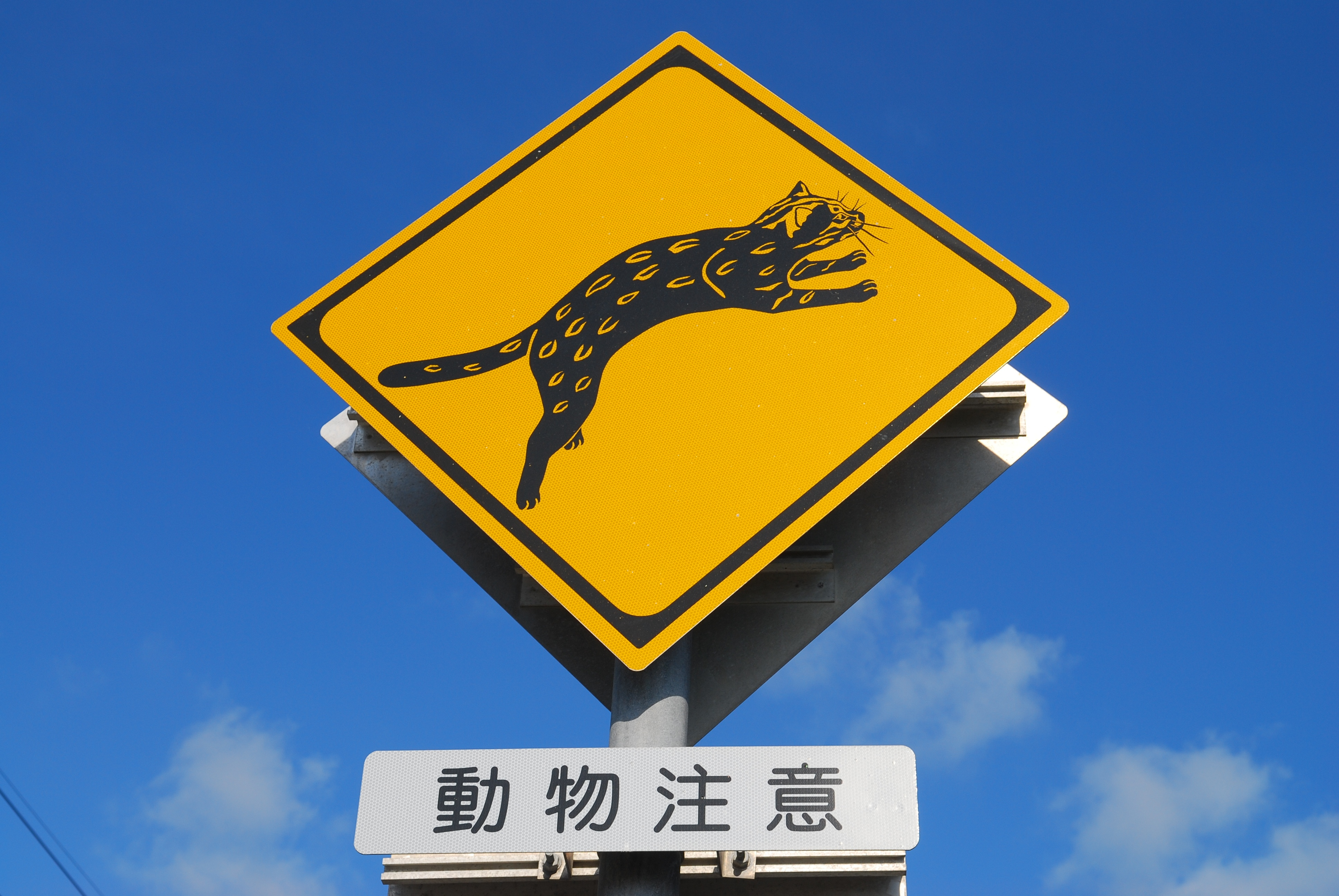
Sign warning motorists of animals, with a picture of an Iriomote cat

Destruction of habitat due to development, predation by dogs, traffic accidents, and traps set for wild boar and crabs all contribute to the decline in number of Iriomote cats. During the second survey of the island, conducted from 1982–1984, it was estimated that 83–108 Iriomote cats lived on the island. The third survey, conducted from 1993–1994, estimated that 99–110 of the cats were on the island. During the fourth survey, conducted from 2005–2007, there were an estimated 100–109 remaining cats. The method of estimating the numbers differed between the third and fourth surveys, though; if the third estimate were to be revised, there would have been an estimated 108–118 Iriomote cats at the time, meaning that the population is shrinking over time.

Along with traffic accidents, logging, and development of the swamplands, house pets are also causing problems. House cats and especially stray cats cause issues with competition, disease transmission, and genetic pollution due to hybridisation between the two species. It is also feared that dogs prey on the Iriomote cats. The government has successfully eliminated the stray cat population on Iriomote.

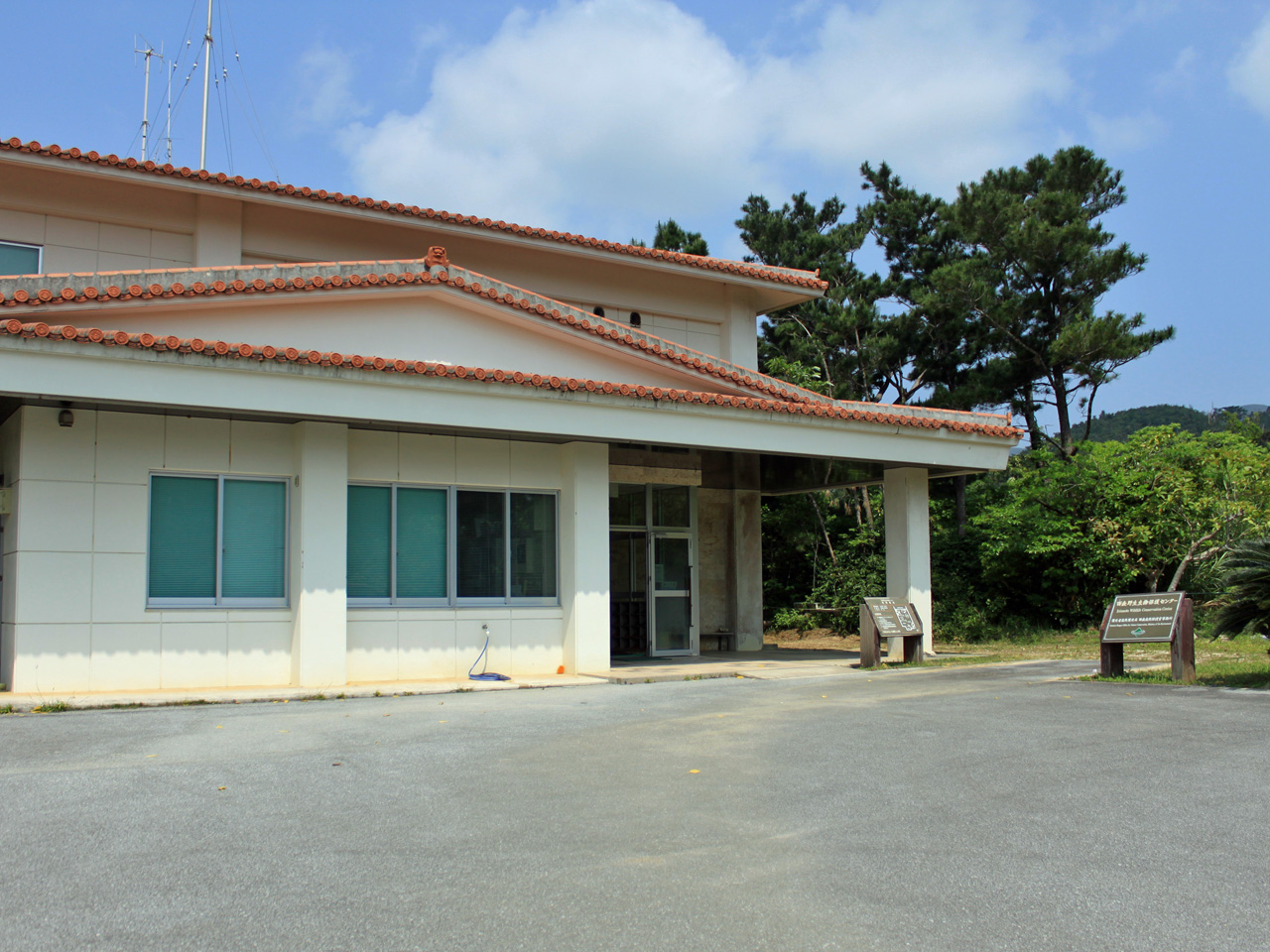
Iriomote Wildlife Conservation Centre

The primary fear stems from house cats that have become feral or partially feral, but there has been no monitoring of these interactions. Pressure from competition over food, contact with house cats that have contracted feline immunodeficiency virus (FIV) and other contagious diseases, as well as decrease in population due to hybridisation are all important issues with the Iriomote cat.

In June 1999, the Iriomote Wildlife Protection Centre conducted an investigation among 50 house and feral cats and 23 Iriomote cats in order to see if FIV was being transmitted within the populations. FIV was not seen in any of the Iriomote cats, but three of the house and feral cats tested positive. Because of the fears regarding transmission of the disease, starting in 2001, Taketomi Town enacted the Cat Breeding Ordinance which required all residents to register their pet cats. In June 2008, the ordinance was revised to include mandatory FIV testing and vaccinations, spaying and neutering, and microchipping. A new limit to the number of pets allowed per owner was also added.

Furthermore, the cane toad, which secretes a poisonous liquid from glands in its ears, has also appeared on the island. In order to prevent further contamination of Iriomote, residents of Ishigaki Island began extermination measures in 2008.

== Conservation ==
=== Status ===
Since 2008, the Iriomote cat has been categorised as "critically endangered" by the IUCN.

The Iriomote cat has been designated a natural monument by the Okinawa government. On 15 May 1972, along with the recovery of Okinawa, it was nationally recognised as a natural monument. On 15 March 1977, it was given special status amongst natural monuments, and in 1994 with the Species Protection Act, it was designated as a Specified National Endangered Species of Wild Fauna and Flora (国内希少野生動植物種, Kokunai Kishō Yasei Dōshokubutsu-shu). This act was adopted on 28 January and enacted on 1 March.

=== Projects and activities ===
In 1977, Prince Philip wrote a letter addressed to Crown Prince Akihito regarding the preservation of the Iriomote cat. The report attached to the letter written by Professor Leyhausen suggested outlawing any further migration to the island, as well as banning the cultivation of the land. In response, Crown Prince Akihito said that he wished for a way that would allow for the preservation of the cats and the continued habitation of people on the island. He also explained that the prime minister at the time, Takeo Fukuda, was considering the implementation of a wildlife sanctuary on Iriomote.

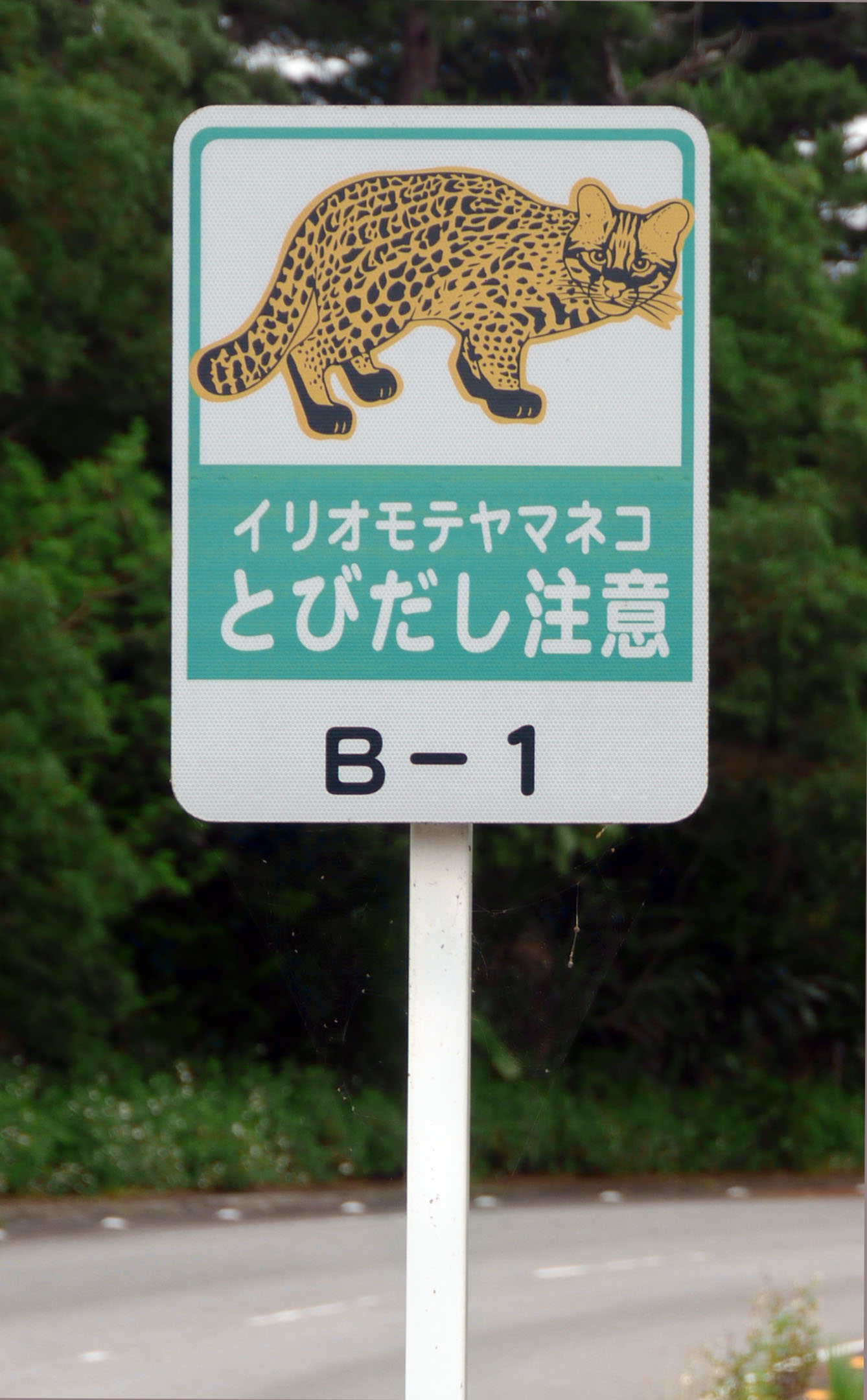
Sign warning motorists of Iriomote cats. The number is used in reporting sightings of the cat.

In 1972, the National Museum of Nature and Science prepared for researching the ecology of Iriomote cats, and in November 1973 the World Wide Fund for Nature and the Ministry of the Environment conducted a joint preliminary investigation regarding the cat's ecology, and from 1974 the Ministry of the Environment conducted a comprehensive investigation that lasted three years. After that, there were three more investigations beginning in 1982, 1992, and 2005.

In 1979, the EPA began a three-year-long feeding operation in order to increase the survival rate of kittens, but these actions have received criticism.

Since the Iriomote cat's discovery, various investigations have taken place. In 2006, automatic cameras and radio telemetry were used in order to understand the cats' state of life. Pathological tests regarding the contagiousness of diseases were also conducted, and tests on faeces and food leftovers were also done. They also compiled records of cat sightings by locals and tourists.

Part of the Iriomote cat's range was designated as Iriomote Ryukyu Government Park (西表政府立公園, Iriomote Seifu-ritsu Kōen) on 18 April 1972. With the US's return of the Ryukyu Islands to Japanese control on 15 May, it became Iriomote-Ishigaki National Park, and in March 1991 11,584.67 hectares of the island was designated the Iriomote Forest and Ecological Preserve (西表島森林生態系保護地域, Iriomote-jima Shinrin Seitaikei Hogo Chiiki) in order to protect the natural environment of the islands. Despite these efforts, not enough land within the cats' preferred habitat of less than 200 m above sea level was included. In 1995 the Iriomote Wildlife Preservation Center (西表野生生物保護センター, Iriomote Yasei Seibutsu Hogo Sentā) was established to increase preservation work, enforce research, and to increase understanding of the cat's ecological needs.

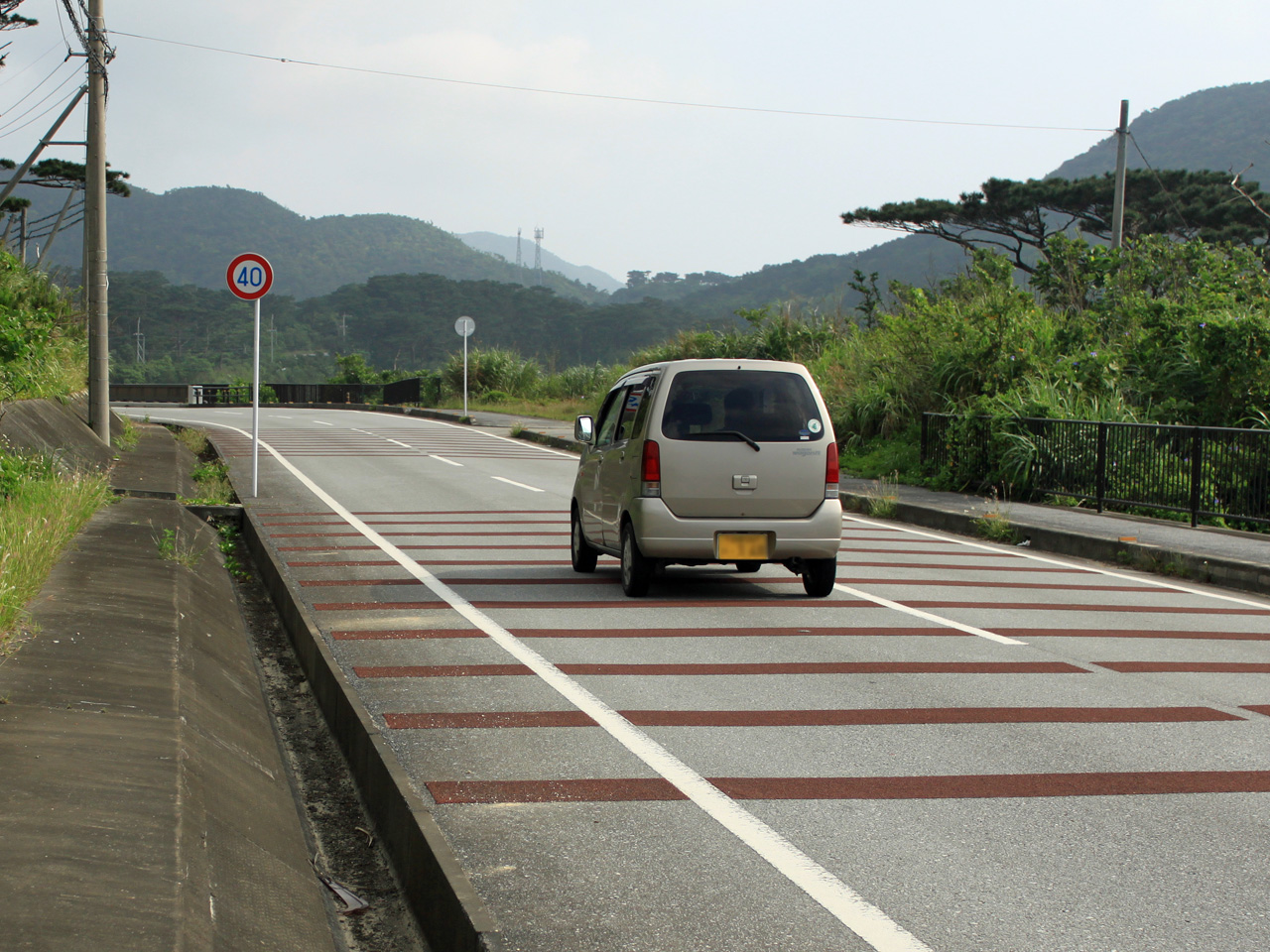
"Zebra zone" strips and inclined ditches on an Iriomote road

Since the US returned control of the Ryukyu Islands to Japan in 1972, development on Iriomote continued with finances from the Okinawan mainland. In 1977, a prefectural road was built that circles half of the island, which has led to a few Iriomote cat deaths every year due to traffic accidents. The Ministry of the Environment as well as the governments of Okinawa and Taketomi Town began installing road signs to warn people of Iriomote cats crossing the road, tunnels beneath the road for their safe crossing, zebra zones which create loud noises when cars ride over them, wide ditches on the sides of roads, and ditches on the side of the road that are inclined on one side in order to improve the preservation of the cats. However, many residents have objected to restrictions on land cultivation and improvement brought about by the measures in place to protect the Iriomote cat and other species on the island.

In 2023, visitor caps were imposed for the island, limiting tourists to 1,200 a day, or 33,000 a year. This is a significant cut from the average 300,000 a year that visited before the COVID-19 pandemic.

=== In captivity ===
There have been a handful of Iriomote cats kept in captivity. A five-week-old male kitten that had been separated from its mother was found on 14 June 1979. He was named Keita and was kept at the Okinawa Zoo until he died of old age at approximately thirteen years and two months of age. A female specimen was also kept at the National Museum of Nature and Science. She was believed to have been approximately nine years and seven months old when she died. On 6 August 1996, a male kitten that would later be known as Yon was taken into care at the Iriomote Wildlife Protection Centre after being involved in a traffic accident.

=== Yon ===
==== Discovery and hospitalisation ====
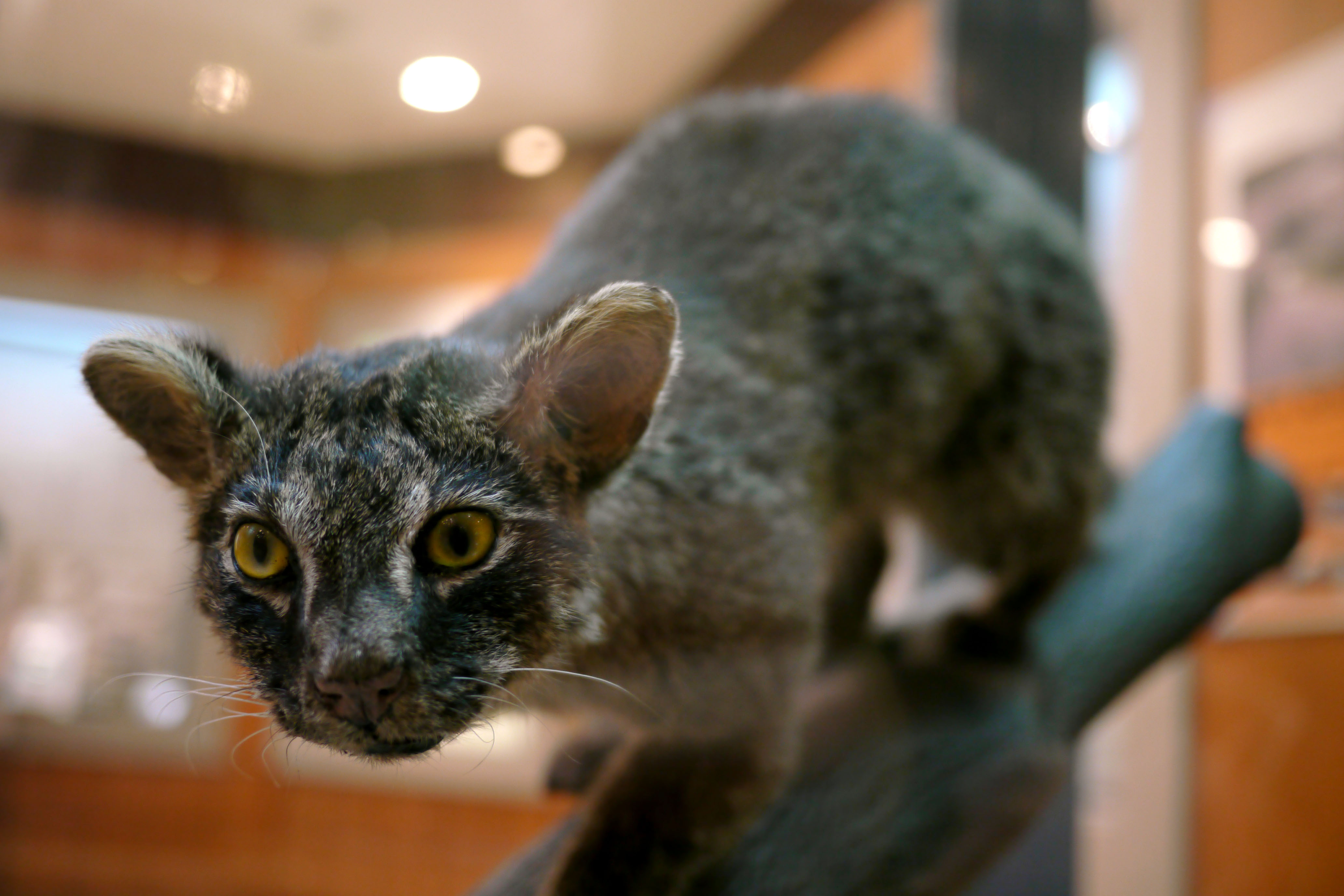
The taxidermied body of "Yon". He was hit by a car on 6 August 1996 then rehabilitated at the Iriomote Wildlife Conservation Centre. He died on 9 April 2011 at the estimated age of fifteen years and one month, the longest confirmed lifespan of any Iriomote cat.

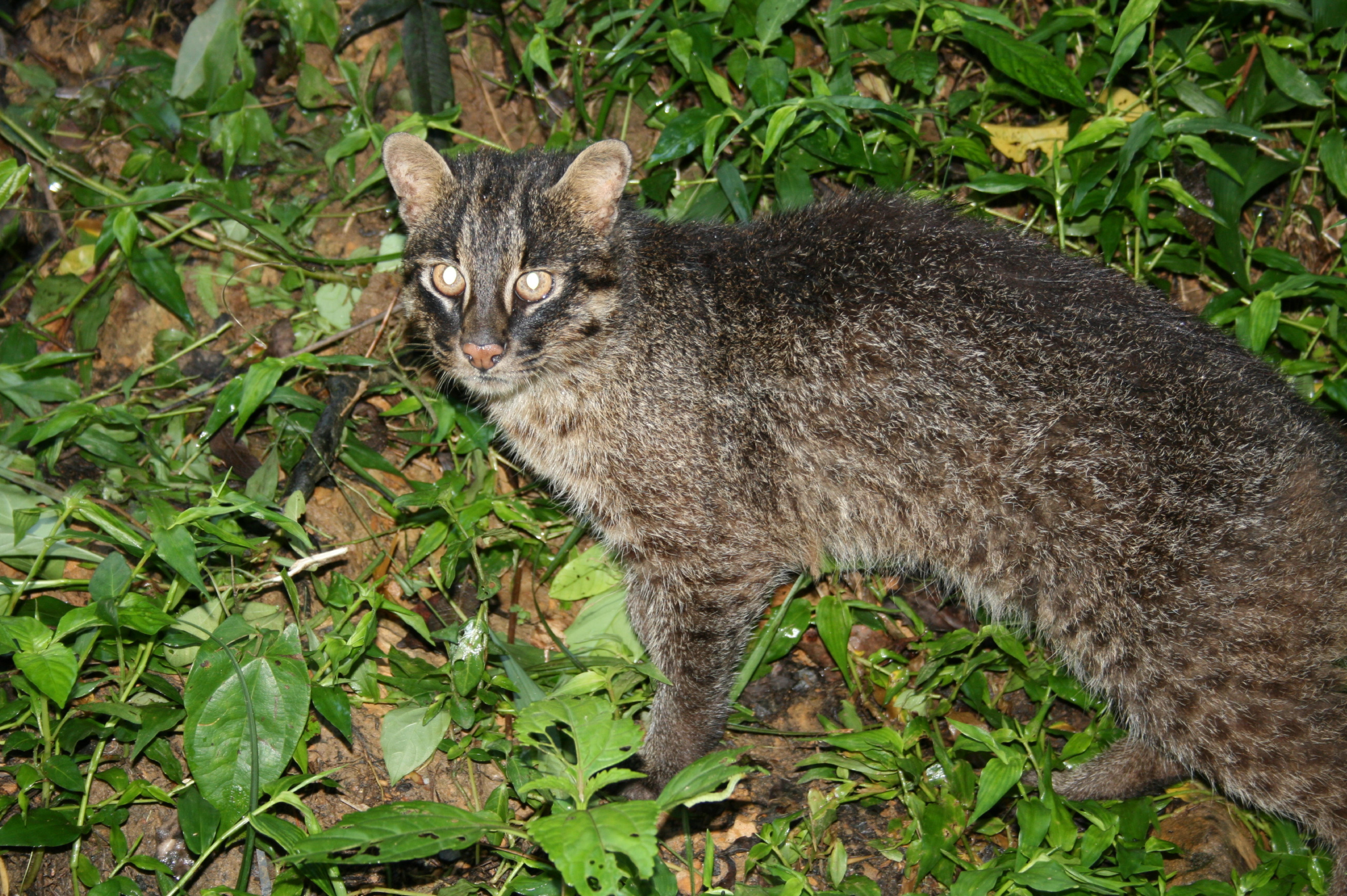
Yon (W-48) as an adult.

On 6 August 1996, a young Iriomote cat was involved in a traffic accident near Nadara Bridge on the northern part of the island. He weighed 1.6 kg and was assumed to have been born in early March, making him about five months old. It is possible that he had just been separated from his mother. The next morning, he had regained consciousness, but he wasn't able to regulate his body temperature due to the serious injuries he had received. He was transferred to Ishigaki Island at 9:00 to receive medical care at Ishigaki Veterinary Clinic. He spent 24 days under their care.

Following the accident, he couldn't move on his own, but he regained his ability to walk while on Ishigaki. He was brought back to the Iriomote Wildlife Preservation Centre for rehabilitation on 31 August. Originally labelled W-48 since he was the forty-eighth confirmed sighting of an Iriomote cat on the western part of the island, he was eventually given the name Yon.

==== Rehabilitation ====
By 2 September, Yon weighed 1.9 kg. Despite his progress, his caretakers noticed a tendency for him to turn to the right because of the effects of his accident.

From the beginning, Yon's caretakers took careful measures to avoid acclimation to humans so that one day he could be released back into the wild. Only three staff members were allowed to feed him directly. Other people, including centre staff, were only allowed to view him via video camera monitoring. The media were also prohibited from taking direct photographs.

From the time he was discharged until 3 February 1999, Yon's rehabilitation was restricted to a room within the centre. Thin logs were used to make a jungle gym so that he would be able to practice walking, jumping, and climbing trees. Rice plants were also grown in his room as a substitute for grass that cats use to help regurgitate. Once he was healthy enough, he was moved to an outdoor cage where he lived until his health began deteriorating on 20 December 2010.

==== Death ====
On 20 December 2010, Yon was found to be curled up and unmoving near a dried stream. He was brought into the centre's rehabilitation room, where it was discovered that he had pulmonary edema, which had nearly killed him; however, he was able to eat by the next day and gradually got better. He was unable to walk for the remainder of December, though by the end of January he had regained this ability and, during February and March, he improved enough to be able to walk up and down stairs. However, his condition then took a turn for the worse, and he died on the night of 9 April at an estimated fifteen years and one month old. He weighed 3.5 kg and was 78.5 cm long. He is the oldest Iriomote cat on record.

==== Influence on research ====
Yon was the first Iriomote cat to be kept for an extended period of time, the only one to be saved after an accident, and the first to go through rehabilitation. Other Iriomote cats that were rescued either died immediately or shortly after being brought in for care.

Though he was never returned to the wild, the recorded observations of Yon are considered important regarding Iriomote cat preservation. Every day, records were taken including what he did at what time, weight, and anything else of note. Because of difficulties in researching Iriomote cats in the wild, observations of Yon are currently the best example of the cats' natural behaviour. There are also very few cases of the cats being cared for by people, so records of his health care may help injured and sick Iriomote cats in the future.

== In culture ==
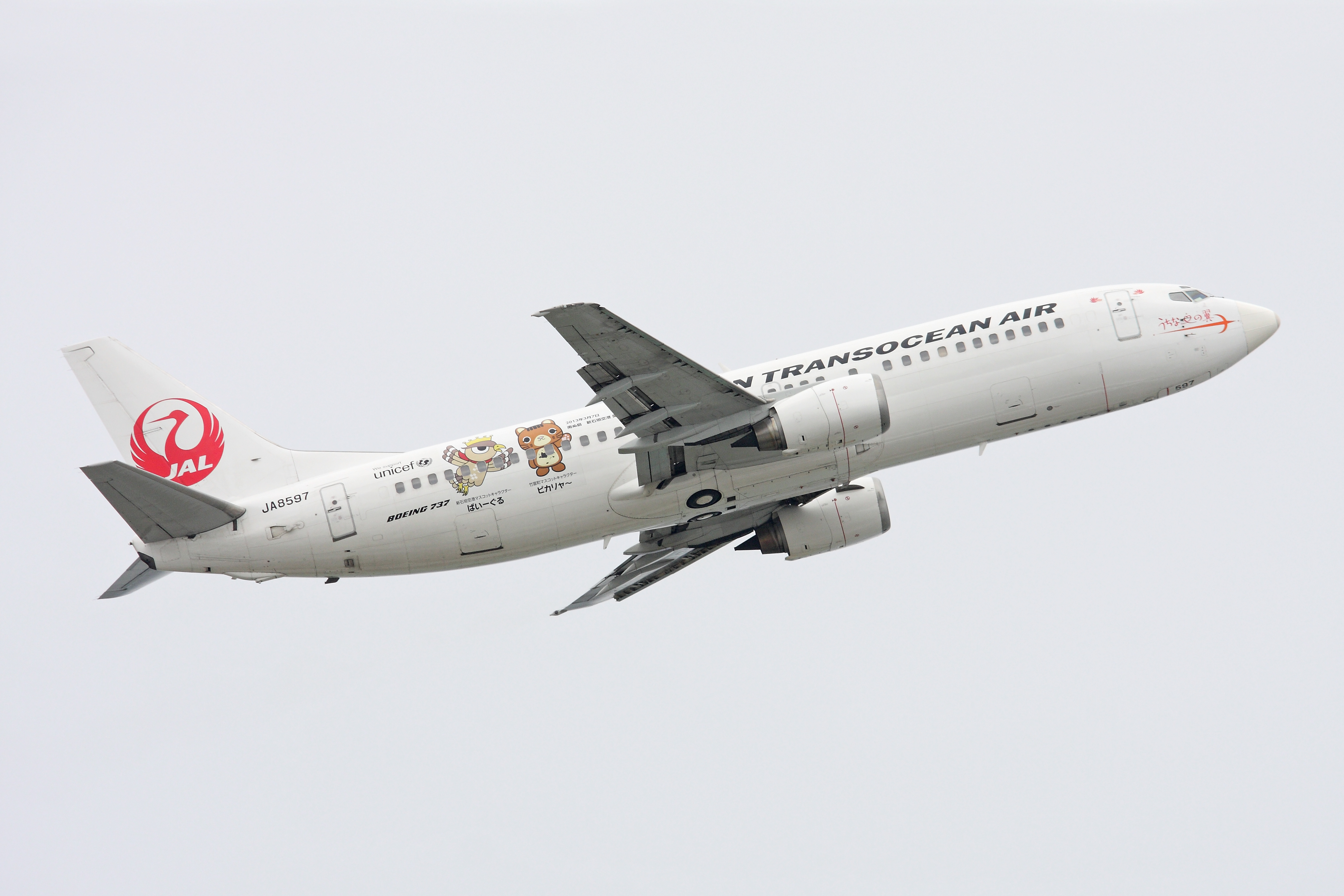
A Japan Airlines plane with livery representing Pikaryaa, the cat mascot

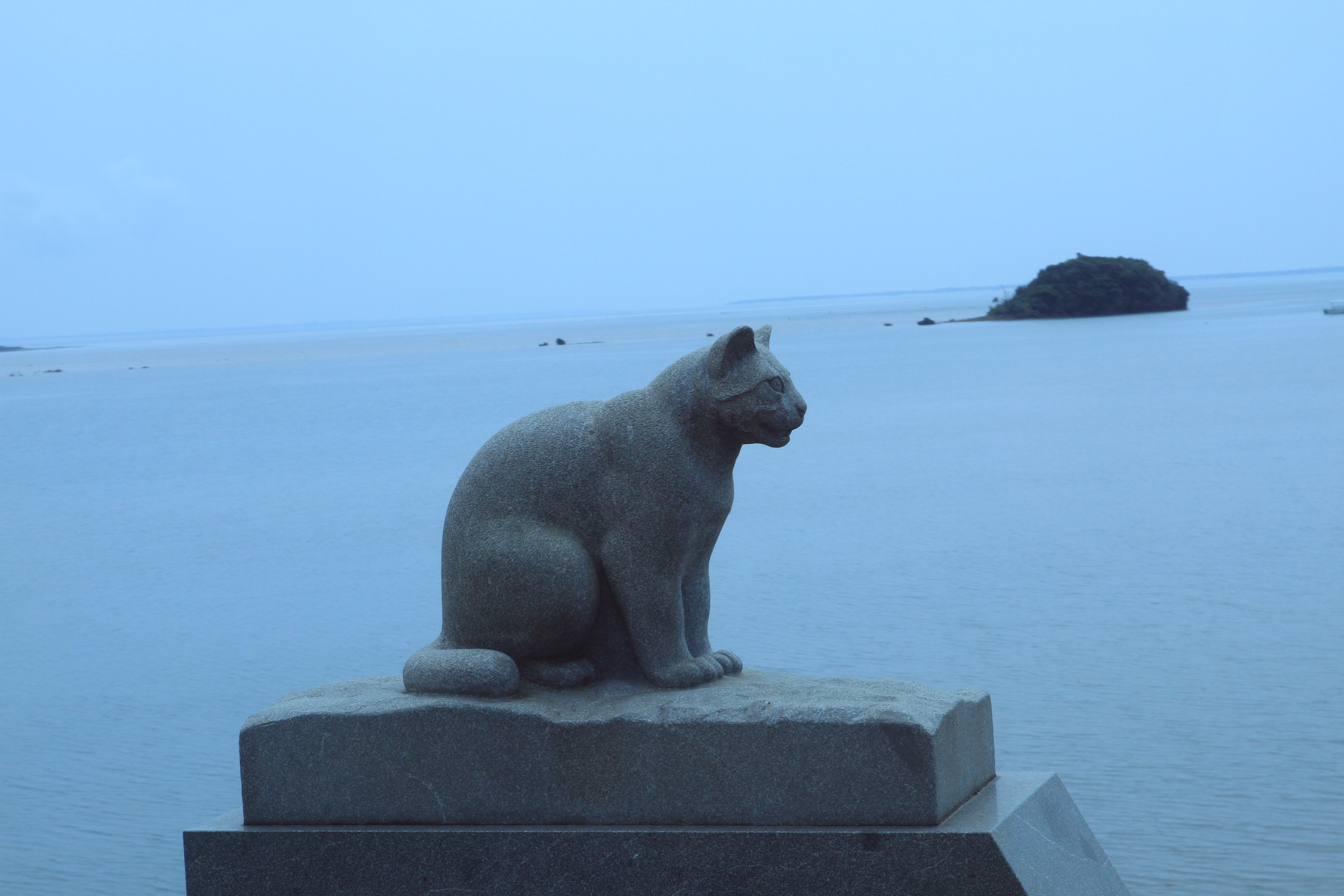
Statue of an Iriomote cat on the Nakama bridge, Taketomi

In July 2010, the Taketomi Tourist Association invited residents to create a design for a local mascot. A Komi Elementary School sixth grader's design, which was based on the Iriomote cat, was chosen. The island of Iriomote is pictured on the mascot's chest. It was named in the same manner it was designed; in August 2010, the name "Pikaryaa" (ピカリャ～) was chosen based on the submission of an Ishigaki resident who drew inspiration from the local nickname of the cat, yamapikaryaa. The town of Taketomi initiated an "Iriomote Wild Cat Day" (イリオモテヤマネコの日 (Iriomote Yamaneko no hi)) in 2015. In July 2016, Taketomi signed a partnership with Tsushima based on their common endemic wild cats. Tsushima hosts the Tsushima cat, another leopard cat subspecies. The island also has several statues representing the Iriomote cat. In the south-east of the island, spanning across the Nakama River, the Nakama bridge is guarded on each side by two stone statues of the cat in various positions. And in 2017, the town of Taketomi revealed two new bronze statues, one in a rest area on the west coast of Iriomote Island, and the other at the beginning of a bridge in the North of the island.

== Yamapikaryaa ==
In general, names such as yamapikaryaa are used in reference to the Iriomote cat, but some locals claim to have seen another type of cat on the island. It is described as being twice as large as a domestic cat, with a tail that is 60 cm long and a coat pattern that is different from what the Iriomote cat displays. It has been sighted several times. Locals have given it several nicknames. In the neighborhoods of Sonai and Komi they call it kunzumayaa (クンズマヤー) and toutouyaa (トウトウヤー), respectively, and on Aragusu Island they call it yamapikaryaa (ヤマピカリャー). It is thought to be different from a house cat, stray cat, and Iriomote cat.

In 1965, Togawa spoke with a local hunter who claimed to have killed a large cat with fur like a tiger's. He disposed of the body, and Haemi on the southern part of the island, where the body was disposed of, was searched. The hunter said that, until ten days prior to the interview, the cat's skeleton was still where he had left it, but the recent rains had washed it away. He described that cat as having a shoulder height that reached an adult human's knee, a tail that was 60 cm long, a body twice as large as a house cat's, and greenish striped fur.

On 2 June 1982, the Yomiuri Shimbun published an article about yamapikaryaa. An experienced boar hunter claimed to have seen yamapikaryaa about ten times in the mountains around Mount Dedou. He also said that he caught and ate one once. On another occasion, he said he saw an adult female yamapikaryaa with a kitten.

Other articles regarding yamapikaryaa have also been published, including on 14 September 2007. Professor Eiyuu Akiyoshi (秋吉英雄, Akiyoshi Eiyuu) of Shimane University, who was staying on Iriomote in order to research fish, spotted a cat larger than the Iriomote cat with a long tail and spots. He saw the cat on Sakiyama Peninsula (崎山半島, Sakiyama Hantō) on the seldom-visited western part of the island.

Tadaaki Imaizumi (今泉忠明, Imaizumi Tadaaki), on the other hand, spoke with a hunter in 1994 who had the skull of what he believed was a large wild cat. Tadaaki Imaizumi determined that it was a house cat.
