= Maladera taiheii =

Scientific classification
- Kingdom: Animalia
- Phylum: Arthropoda
- Class: Insecta
- Order: Coleoptera
- Suborder: Polyphaga
- Infraorder: Scarabaeiformia
- Family: Scarabaeidae
- Genus: Maladera
- Species: M. taiheii

Binomial name
- Maladera taiheii Kobayashi, 2016

Species of beetle

Maladera taiheii is a species of beetle of the family Scarabaeidae. It is found in Japan (Iriomote Island).

== Description ==
Adults reach a length of about 9.5 mm. They have an oval body. They are dark reddish brown, with the antennae yellowish brown, the ventral surface and legs reddish brown to dark reddish brown and the dorsal and ventral surface almost opaque. The clypeus and legs are shining.

== Etymology ==
The species is dedicated to Mr. Taihei Matsushita who first collected the species.
