= Gloomy tube-nosed bat =

Conservation status
- Critically endangered, possibly extinct (IUCN 3.1)

Scientific classification
- Kingdom: Animalia
- Phylum: Chordata
- Class: Mammalia
- Order: Chiroptera
- Family: Vespertilionidae
- Genus: Murina
- Species: M. tenebrosa

Binomial name
- Murina tenebrosa Yoshiyuki, 1970

Species of bat

The gloomy tube-nosed bat (Murina tenebrosa) is a species of vesper bat in the genus Murina. It is only known by the holotype, an old female, collected in an abandoned mine on Tsushima Island in 1962. There is a shortage of intact forests, and limited caves and mines available for roosting. Surveys to rediscover this species failed. Due to its imperiled status, it is identified by the Alliance for Zero Extinction as a species in danger of imminent extinction.

== Taxonomy ==
The gloomy tube-nosed bat was described as a new species in 1970 by M. Yoshiyuki. The holotype, an old female, had been collected on Tsushima Island in 1962 in an abandoned mine by Yoshinori Imaizumi and I. Obara. As of 2019, this is the only individual of this species that has ever been found. It is possible that it is a synonym of the Ussuri tube-nosed bat (M. ussuriensis).

== Description ==
The holotype had a forearm length of 33.8 mm (1.33 in). Its greatest length of skull was 16.81 mm (0.662 in). The ear length is 16.0 mm (0.63 in) with a tragus length of 8.5 mm (0.33 in). The fur on its back is ochre in color, with its belly fur yellowish beige.

== Range and habitat ==
Based on the type locality, the gloomy tube-nosed bat may be reliant on subterranean habitat such as caves and mines for its roosts.

== Conservation ==
Despite cave surveys and other sampling attempts with mist nets in the early 2000s, this species has not been documented since 1962. It is possibly extinct. The area where the holotype was found has little remaining forest habitat and few known caves and mines. It is considered data deficient in the Japanese Red List and critically endangered by the International Union for Conservation of Nature.
