= Maladera opima =

Scientific classification
- Kingdom: Animalia
- Phylum: Arthropoda
- Class: Insecta
- Order: Coleoptera
- Suborder: Polyphaga
- Infraorder: Scarabaeiformia
- Family: Scarabaeidae
- Genus: Maladera
- Species: M. opima

Binomial name
- Maladera opima Nomura, 1967

Species of beetle

Maladera opima is a species of beetle of the family Scarabaeidae. It is found in Japan. It was described from Iriomote Island.

== Description ==
Adults reach a length of about 11.5 mm. They have a rufo-fuscous, oval, convex body, with the head and pronotum (except for the margins) darker. The antennae are fulvous. The surface of the body is opaque, with the clypeus, antennae, tibiae and tarsi shining.
