= Maladera nitidiceps =

Scientific classification
- Kingdom: Animalia
- Phylum: Arthropoda
- Class: Insecta
- Order: Coleoptera
- Suborder: Polyphaga
- Infraorder: Scarabaeiformia
- Family: Scarabaeidae
- Genus: Maladera
- Species: M. nitidiceps

Binomial name
- Maladera nitidiceps Nomura, 1967

Species of beetle

Maladera nitidiceps is a species of beetle of the family Scarabaeidae. It is found in Taiwan and Japan (Iriomote Island).

== Description ==
Adults reach a length of about 7-7.3 mm. They have a rufous to rufo-piceous, elongate-oval, convex body. The antennae are fulvous and the eyes are black. The margins of hind tibiae and sometimes two or three basal joints of the hind tarsi are blackish. The surface of the body is more or less opaque, with the head, antennae, lateral and apical areas of the pronotum and legs shining.
