= Japanese noctule =

Conservation status
- Endangered (IUCN 3.1)

Scientific classification
- Kingdom: Animalia
- Phylum: Chordata
- Class: Mammalia
- Order: Chiroptera
- Family: Vespertilionidae
- Genus: Nyctalus
- Species: N. furvus

Binomial name
- Nyctalus furvus Imaizumi & Yoshiyuki, 1968

Species of bat

The Japanese noctule (Nyctalus furvus) is a species of bat belonging to the family Vespertilionidae. It is endemic to Japan.
