= Mizuko Yoshiyuki =

Japanese mammalogist and zoologist

- 吉行瑞子
- Born: 1932 (age 93–94); Miyazaki Prefecture, Japan
- Known for: Taxonomic research on Japanese bats
- Awards: Mammalogical Society of Japan Special Award (2011)
- Scientific career
- Fields: Mammalogy, zoology, systematics
- Workplaces: National Museum of Nature and Science; Tokyo University of Agriculture

Mizuko Yoshiyuki (吉行 瑞子, Yoshiyuki Mizuko; born 1932) is a Japanese mammalogist and zoologist specialising in mammalian taxonomy and systematics. She received a Doctor of Agriculture degree from Kyushu University in 1984 for her dissertation, A Taxonomic Study of Japanese Chiroptera. She has served as a professor at Tokyo University of Agriculture.

== Career ==
Yoshiyuki was born in 1932 in Miyazaki Prefecture, Japan. She worked as a senior research scientist in the Department of Zoology at the National Museum of Nature and Science (then the National Science Museum). In 1992, she became a professor at the Junior College of Tokyo University of Agriculture. In 1994, she was appointed professor in the Department of Animal Science at the university's Faculty of Agriculture.

== Research ==
Yoshiyuki's research focuses primarily on mammalian systematics and taxonomy, particularly the classification of bats (order Chiroptera) in Japan and neighbouring regions.

=== Taxa described ===
The following taxa were described by Yoshiyuki, either independently or in collaboration with other researchers:

- Nyctalus furvus — Imaizumi & Yoshiyuki, 1968 (Japanese: Koyama's bat).
- Rhinolophus imaizumii — Hill & Yoshiyuki, 1980 (Japanese: Iriomote horseshoe bat).
- Murina tenebrosa — Yoshiyuki, 1970 (Japanese: Kuchiba tube-nosed bat).

== Publications ==
=== Books ===
- Michael Buehler. Wild Cats. Translated by Mizuko Yoshiyuki. Shufu to Seikatsusha, 1973.
- Michael Buehler. Life in the Forest. Translated by Mizuko Yoshiyuki, September 1977.
- Mizuko Yoshiyuki (text) and Tadayoshi Yamamoto (illustrations). Bats. Fukuinkan Shoten, April 1984.
- Mizuko Yoshiyuki. A Systematic Study of the Japanese Chiroptera. National Science Museum, 1989.
- Jane Burton and Kim Taylor (photographs), Robert Burton (text). Eggs: Hatching from Eggs. Supervised translation by Mizuko Yoshiyuki. Hyoronsha, March 1994.
- Mizuko Yoshiyuki and Hideki Endo. Catalogue of Chiropteran Specimens in Spirit. National Science Museum, 2003.
- Kimitake Funakoshi, Dai Fukui, Kuniko Kawai and Mizuko Yoshiyuki. The Wonders of Bats. Gijutsu-Hyohron, 25 July 2007. ISBN 978-4-7741-3135-1.

A catalogue of books held by Japanese university libraries is available through the National Institute of Informatics.

=== Selected academic papers ===
Yoshiyuki's publications include the following research papers:

- Yoshiyuki, Mizuko (1970). "A New Species of Tube-nosed Bat from Japan" (in English). Memoirs of the National Science Museum, 13: 195–198.
- Yoshiyuki, Mizuko (1971). "A New Species of the Genus Myotis from Japan" (in English). Memoirs of the National Science Museum, 14 (3): 305–310.
- Yoshiyuki, Mizuko (1979). "A New Species of the Genus Ptenochirus from the Philippines". Bulletin of the National Science Museum, Series A (Zoology), 5 (1): 75–81.
- Yoshiyuki, Mizuko (1980). "A New Species of the Genus Rhinolophus from Iriomote Island, with Notes on Related Species". Bulletin of the National Science Museum, Series A (Zoology), 6 (3): 179–189.
- Yoshiyuki, Mizuko (1983). "A New Species of the Genus Murina from Japan". Bulletin of the National Science Museum, Series A (Zoology), 9 (3): 141–150.
- Yoshiyuki, Mizuko (1984). "An Analysis of Populations of the Japanese Lesser Mole Shrew in Central and Northern Honshu". Memoirs of the National Science Museum, 117: 179–188.
- Yoshiyuki, Mizuko (1984). "A New Species of the Genus Myotis from Hokkaido, Japan". Bulletin of the National Science Museum, Series A (Zoology), 10 (3): 153–159.
- Yoshiyuki, Mizuko and Yoshinori Imaizumi (1986). "A New Species of Shrew from Sado Island, Japan" (in English). Bulletin of the National Science Museum, Series A (Zoology), 12 (4): 185–193.
- Yoshiyuki, Mizuko (1988). "The Mammals of Thailand: I. Family Talpidae". Bulletin of the National Science Museum, Series A (Zoology), 14 (4): 215–222.
- Yoshiyuki, Mizuko (1988). "Ezo Raccoon Dogs on Okushiri Island". Memoirs of the National Science Museum, 21: 189–197.
- Yoshiyuki, Mizuko (1988). "The Taxonomic Status of the Lesser White-toothed Shrew from Korea". Bulletin of the National Science Museum, Series A (Zoology), 14 (3): 151–158.
- Yoshiyuki, Mizuko (1989). "A Systematic Study of the Japanese Chiroptera". National Science Museum Monographs, 7: 1–242.
- Yoshiyuki, Mizuko (2007). "In Memoriam: Professor Yoshinori Imaizumi". Mammalian Science, 47 (2): 271–273.
- Yoshiyuki, Mizuko (2008). "The Japanese Society for Systematic Zoology and Dr Yoshinori Imaizumi (In Memoriam)". Taxa, 24: 3–4.
- Takahiro Takano, Motokazu Ando, Hiroshi Ogawa, Takayuki Tsuchiya, Mizuko Yoshiyuki and Takashi Amano (2008). "Falls and Mortality of Small Mammals in Drainage Ditches with Constant Flowing Water". Mammalian Science, 48 (1): 1–9.
- Yoshiyuki, Mizuko, Yoshiyasu Hayashi and Takashi Mizusawa (2010). "A Woolly Bat Newly Recorded from Taiwan". Animate, 8: 1–10.

A list of Yoshiyuki's academic papers indexed by the National Institute of Informatics is available online.

== Awards ==
- Special Award, Mammalogical Society of Japan (2011).
