= Nakara River =

- Location within Japan
- Native name: 仲良川 (Japanese)

Location
- Country: Japan
- Region: Iriomote-jima Island

Physical characteristics
- Source
  - location: Japan
- Mouth
  - coordinates: 24°21′N 123°45′E

The Nakara River (仲良川, Nakara-gawa) is a river located on the western side of the island of Iriomote, one of the Yaeyama Islands of Japan.

== Climate ==
The mean annual temperature is 23.4 °C, and the mean annual rainfall during the period 1979 to 2000 was 2342 mm / year.

== Environment ==
The river's estuary and shoreline supports three mangrove species, Bruguiera gymnorhiza (L.) Lamk., Rhizophora stylosa Griff. and Kandelia candel (L.) Druce.
