= Nakama River =

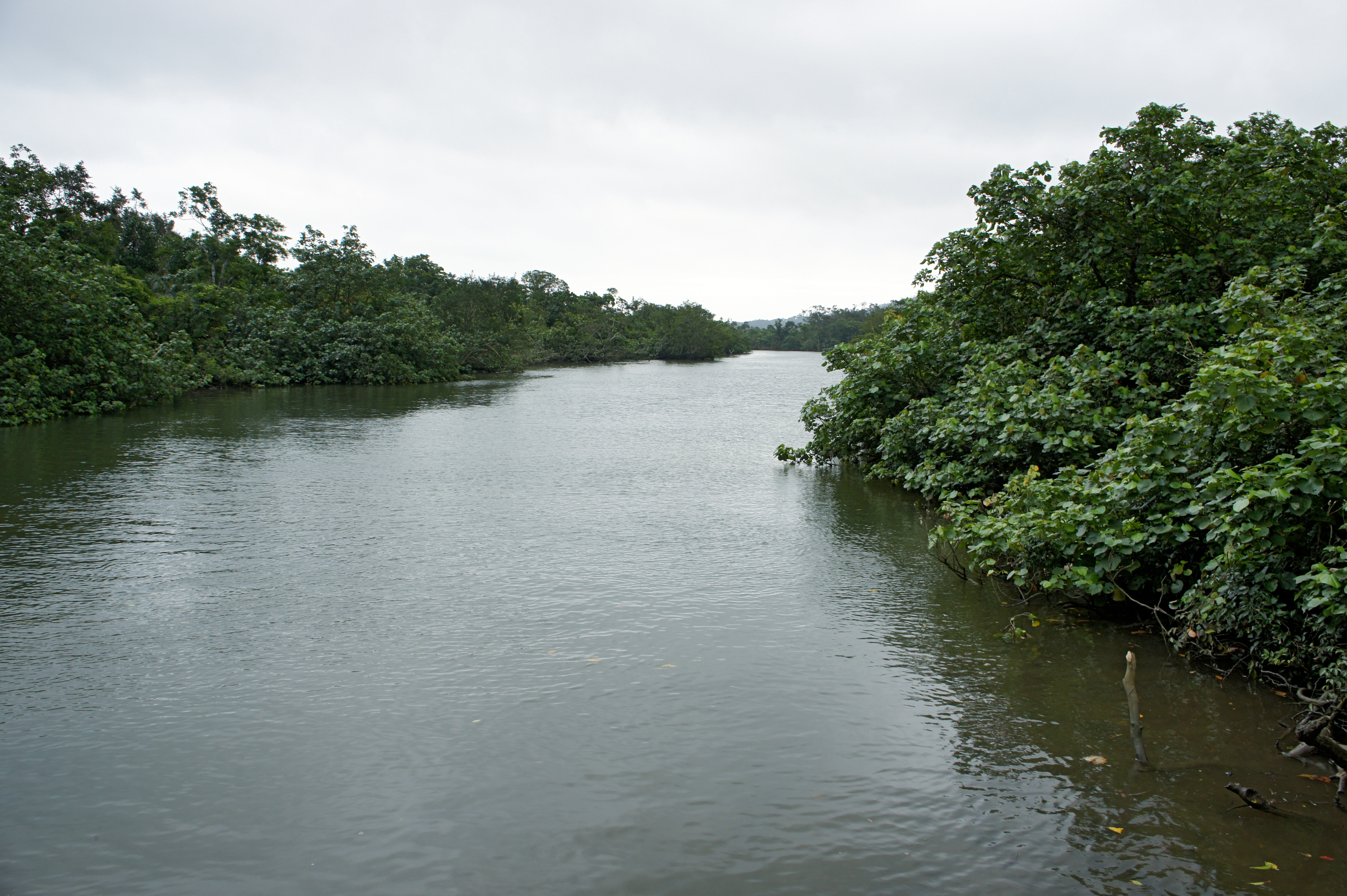
- The Nakama River

- Location within Japan
- Native name: 仲間川 (Japanese)

Location
- Country: Japan
- Prefecture: Okinawa
- Region: Yaeyama Islands
- District: Yaeyama District, Okinawa
- Municipality: Taketomi

Physical characteristics
- Source
  - location: Japan
- 2nd source
  - location: Iriomote-jima
- Mouth
  - coordinates: 24.277404°N 123.884533°E

The Nakama River (仲間川, Nakama-gawa) is a river located on the southeast side of the island of Iriomote, one of the Yaeyama Islands of Japan.
