= Urauchi River =

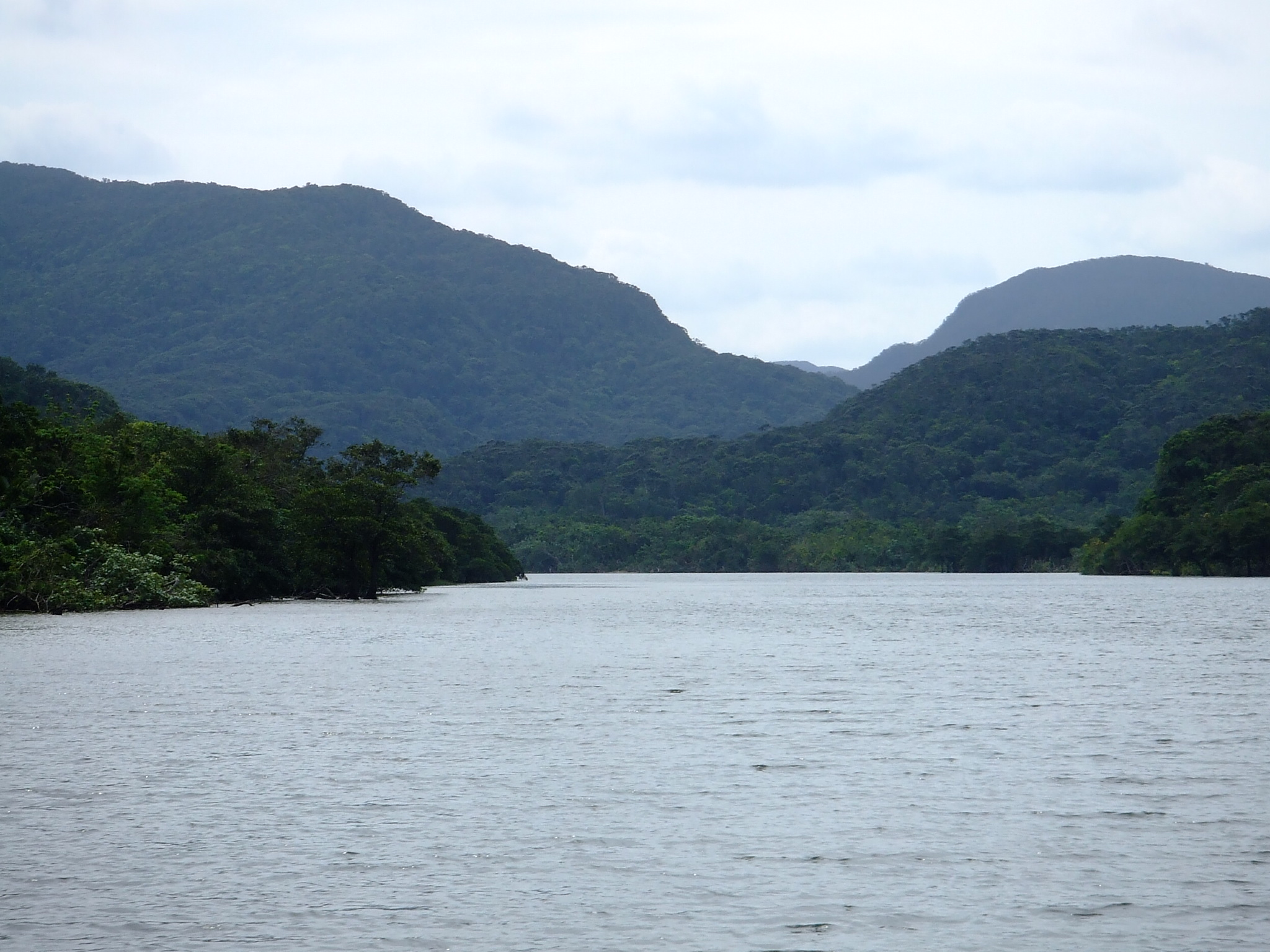

- Native name: 浦内川 (Japanese)

Location
- Country: Japan

Physical characteristics
- Source
  - elevation: 311.7 m (1,023 ft)
- Mouth: East China Sea
  - coordinates: 24°25′06″N 123°46′23″E
- Length: 18.8 km (11.7 mi)
- Basin size: 54.24 km^{2} (20.94 sq mi)
- Discharge
  - average: 120 m^{3}/s (4,200 cu ft/s)

The Urauchi River (浦内川, Okinawan:Urauchi-gawa) flows through the central portion of the island of Iriomote in the Yaeyama District in Okinawa Prefecture, Japan. It is the longest river in Okinawa Prefecture.
