= Yoshinori Imaizumi =

Japanese zoologist (1914–2007)

- Born: Yoshinori Imaizumi; 11 March 1914
- Died: 2 April 2007 (aged 93)

Yoshinori Imaizumi (今泉吉典, Imaizumi Yoshinori; March 11, 1914 – April 2, 2007) was a Japanese zoologist. He is known for describing the Iriomote cat in 1967. He was the director of the zoological department of the National Museum of Nature and Science.
