= Iriomote Island =

Island within Ryukyu Islands

Native name: 西表島
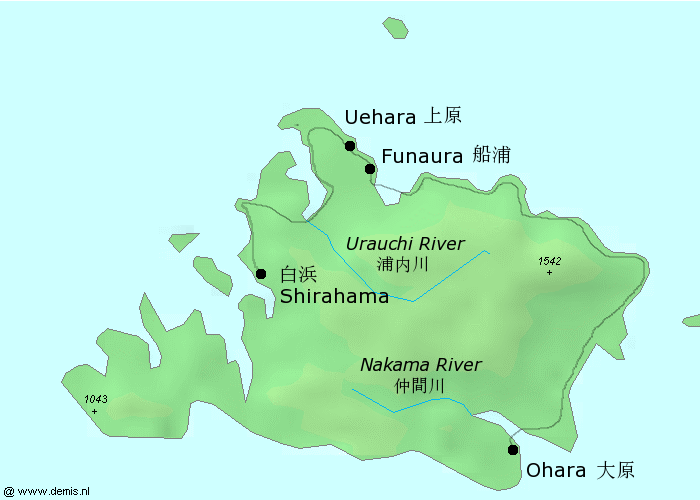
- Map of Iriomote Island

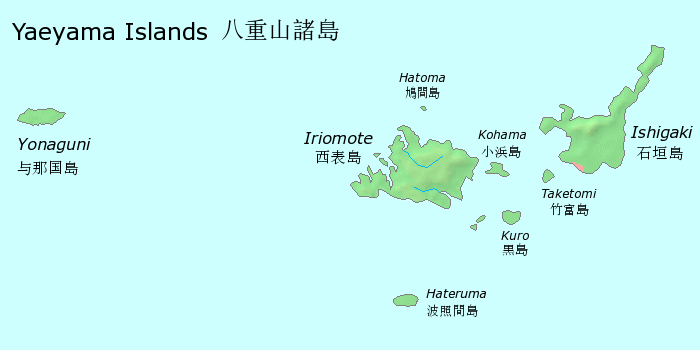
- Iriomote Island in relation to the other Yaeyama Islands

Geography
- Location: Bordering the Pacific Ocean and East China Sea, southwest of mainland Japan and east of Taiwan
- Coordinates: 24°20′24″N 123°48′36″E
- Archipelago: Yaeyama Islands
- Area: 289.27 km^{2} (111.69 sq mi)
- Coastline: 130.0 km (80.78 mi)
- Highest elevation: 469.5 m (1540.4 ft)
- Highest point: Mt. Komi (古見岳, Komi-dake)

Administration
- Japan
- Prefecture: Okinawa Prefecture
- Town: Taketomi, Okinawa

Demographics
- Population: 2,347 (2005)
- Ethnic groups: Ryukyuan, Japanese

UNESCO World Heritage Site
- Part of: Amami-Ōshima Island, Tokunoshima Island, northern part of Okinawa Island, and Iriomote Island
- Criteria: Natural: x
- Reference: 1574-005
- Inscription: 2021 (44th Session)

Iriomote Island (西表島, Iriomote-jima; Yaeyama: Irïmutii; Iriomote: Irimutii; Okinawan: Iriumuti) is the largest of the Yaeyama Islands of Japan, and the second largest in Okinawa Prefecture after Okinawa Island itself.

The island has an area of 289.27 km^{2} (111.69 sq mi) and a 2005 population of 2,347. The island does not have an airstrip, and most visitors—over 390,000 in 2006—arrive from Ishigaki by ferry, a 31.4 km (19.5 mi) ride to Uehara Port (上原港) on Iriomote's northeast coast or Ōhara Port (大原港) on the southeast coast. Administratively, the island belongs to Taketomi Town, Okinawa Prefecture. Its infrastructure is limited to a single coastal road connecting the hamlets on the northern and eastern shores.

Iriomote Island is not part of Japan's flight information region, but that of Taiwan.

== Wildlife ==
The island is famed for the Iriomote cat, a critically endangered wild cat found only on Iriomote. As of 2007, the population size is estimated to be 100–109 individuals.

The island has a venomous snake, Protobothrops elegans or "elegant pit viper", known locally as the habu, a species whose bite has a fatality rate of 3% and a permanent disability rate of 6–8%.

Satakentia liukiuensis, the only species in the genus Satakentia, is a palm tree that is endemic to the two islands of Ishigaki and Iriomote in the Yaeyama Islands.

== Culture ==
The Iriomote dialect of the Yaeyama language is spoken by some people on the island.

== History ==
The island had few settlements of fishermen and rice growers on the coastal areas, but it never had a large population until the Iriomote Coal Mine operated between 1889 and 1959.

During World War II some residents of Ishigaki were forcibly made to take refuge in Iriomote, many of whom contracted malaria. After the war, the US Forces in Japan eradicated malaria from the island, and the island has been malaria-free since then. The island, together with the rest of Okinawa Prefecture, remained a US-controlled territory until 1972. Iriomote was returned to Japan on June 17, 1972.

The possibility exists that a World War II-era U.S. submarine lies in about 350 m (1,150 ft) of water off the coast of Iriomote Island. During operations with an Okinawan company using a U.S. made "SCORPIO" ROV in 1995, a group of divers encountered a sonar contact with what appeared to be a metal structure, about 6.1 m (20 ft) in diameter and about 35 m (115 ft) in length (exposed) at an angle of roughly 20-30 degrees. The SONAR image of a large unexpected obstruction to the operations prompted the divers to command evasive maneuvers and avoid the area for the safety of the ROV.

The divers, thinking they would have another opportunity to work in the area at a later date, left the area and never returned to that site. Their ROV was lost in 1997 off Yonaguni Island, the last island belonging to Okinawa off the east coast of Taiwan. They were fairly certain that the object was a submarine, and quite possibly the USS Snook. No further dives in the area have yet been attempted.

A large volcanic eruption took place at a submarine volcano north of the island in 1924. It had an estimated volcanic explosivity index of 5. The island's coast was covered in large quantities of pumice and pumice was also found as far as Hokkaido.

== Economy ==
Apart from tourism, the island economy is sustained by agricultural production, primarily of pineapple, sugarcane, mango, culture pearl growing and fishing.

== Geography and climate ==
A satellite photo of Iriomote Island, April 2014. Iriomote is in the center and there are other small islands surrounding it.

90% of the island is covered by dense jungle and mangrove swamps. 80% of the island is protected state land, and 34.3% of the island forms the Iriomote National Park. The highest point on the island is Mt. Komi (古見岳 Komidake) at 469.5 m (1,540 ft). Around 21 km (13 mi) northwest (24.558°N 124.000°E) of Iriomote is an active undersea volcano which last erupted in 1924; the summit is 200 m (660 ft) below sea level. The island is surrounded by multiple smaller islands, including Yubu Island approximately 0.5 km to the east and Ballast Island approximately 2.5 km off the northeastern coast.

The island's Urauchi River is the largest river in Okinawa Prefecture, and the smaller Nakama and Nakara rivers also flow within the island. Iriomote is also home to Pinaisara Falls, the largest waterfall in Okinawa Prefecture.

Iriomote has a tropical rainforest climate (Köppen climate classification Af). The average yearly temperature is 23.9 °C (75.0 °F), and the average monthly temperature ranges from 18.5 °C (65.3 °F) in January to 28.9 °C (84.0 °F) in July. Iriomote has a typhoon season that, on average, runs from June to September.

Climate data for Iriomote (1991−2020 normals, extremes 1954−present)
| Month | Jan | Feb | Mar | Apr | May | Jun | Jul | Aug | Sep | Oct | Nov | Dec | Year |
|---|---|---|---|---|---|---|---|---|---|---|---|---|---|
| Record high °C (°F) | 27.6 (81.7) | 28.0 (82.4) | 29.7 (85.5) | 31.2 (88.2) | 33.4 (92.1) | 34.6 (94.3) | 35.9 (96.6) | 35.0 (95.0) | 34.3 (93.7) | 34.0 (93.2) | 31.2 (88.2) | 29.4 (84.9) | 35.9 (96.6) |
| Mean maximum °C (°F) | 25.6 (78.1) | 26.4 (79.5) | 27.6 (81.7) | 29.4 (84.9) | 31.0 (87.8) | 32.6 (90.7) | 34.0 (93.2) | 33.5 (92.3) | 32.7 (90.9) | 31.3 (88.3) | 29.3 (84.7) | 27.0 (80.6) | 34.2 (93.6) |
| Mean daily maximum °C (°F) | 20.9 (69.6) | 21.6 (70.9) | 23.1 (73.6) | 25.5 (77.9) | 28.3 (82.9) | 30.5 (86.9) | 32.1 (89.8) | 31.5 (88.7) | 30.3 (86.5) | 27.8 (82.0) | 25.5 (77.9) | 22.4 (72.3) | 26.6 (79.9) |
| Daily mean °C (°F) | 18.5 (65.3) | 19.0 (66.2) | 20.2 (68.4) | 22.8 (73.0) | 25.5 (77.9) | 27.8 (82.0) | 28.9 (84.0) | 28.5 (83.3) | 27.6 (81.7) | 25.4 (77.7) | 23.1 (73.6) | 20.0 (68.0) | 23.9 (75.1) |
| Mean daily minimum °C (°F) | 16.4 (61.5) | 16.7 (62.1) | 17.7 (63.9) | 20.3 (68.5) | 23.1 (73.6) | 25.8 (78.4) | 26.5 (79.7) | 26.1 (79.0) | 25.2 (77.4) | 23.4 (74.1) | 21.0 (69.8) | 17.9 (64.2) | 21.7 (71.0) |
| Mean minimum °C (°F) | 11.5 (52.7) | 12.1 (53.8) | 12.8 (55.0) | 15.3 (59.5) | 18.8 (65.8) | 21.8 (71.2) | 24.1 (75.4) | 24.1 (75.4) | 22.3 (72.1) | 20.1 (68.2) | 17.0 (62.6) | 13.3 (55.9) | 10.8 (51.4) |
| Record low °C (°F) | 6.7 (44.1) | 8.3 (46.9) | 7.5 (45.5) | 10.4 (50.7) | 14.0 (57.2) | 16.1 (61.0) | 21.0 (69.8) | 21.6 (70.9) | 17.8 (64.0) | 14.0 (57.2) | 11.0 (51.8) | 8.9 (48.0) | 6.7 (44.1) |
| Average precipitation mm (inches) | 162.9 (6.41) | 146.6 (5.77) | 147.3 (5.80) | 157.3 (6.19) | 175.6 (6.91) | 186.3 (7.33) | 128.8 (5.07) | 282.0 (11.10) | 270.8 (10.66) | 213.1 (8.39) | 192.3 (7.57) | 176.9 (6.96) | 2,240 (88.19) |
| Average precipitation days (≥ 1.0 mm) | 14.1 | 12.0 | 12.0 | 9.9 | 10.0 | 9.8 | 9.1 | 12.0 | 12.3 | 11.1 | 12.2 | 13.5 | 138 |
| Average relative humidity (%) | 73 | 77 | 77 | 78 | 81 | 82 | 81 | 83 | 80 | 75 | 77 | 75 | 78 |
| Mean monthly sunshine hours | 71.8 | 82.9 | 107.1 | 124.3 | 165.8 | 203.7 | 256.2 | 218.8 | 184.5 | 139.1 | 97.1 | 70.7 | 1,721.9 |
Source: Japan Meteorological Agency

== Education ==
Schools on Iriomote Island are operated by Taketomi Town.

Combined elementary and junior high schools include:

- Funauki Elementary and Junior High School (竹富町立船浮小中学校)
- Iriomote Elementary and Junior High School(竹富町立西表小中学校)

Junior high schools include:

- Funaura Junior High School (竹富町立船浦中学校) – Uehara
- Ōhara Junior High School (竹富町立大原中学校) – Haemi

Elementary schools include:

- Komi Elementary School (竹富町立古見小学校) – Komi
- Ohara Elementary School (竹富町立大原小学校) – Haemi
- Shirama Elementary School (竹富町立白浜小学校) – Shirahama (白浜)
- Uehara Elementary School (竹富町立上原小学校) – Uehara

For public senior high school students may attend schools of the Okinawa Prefectural Board of Education.

== Gallery ==
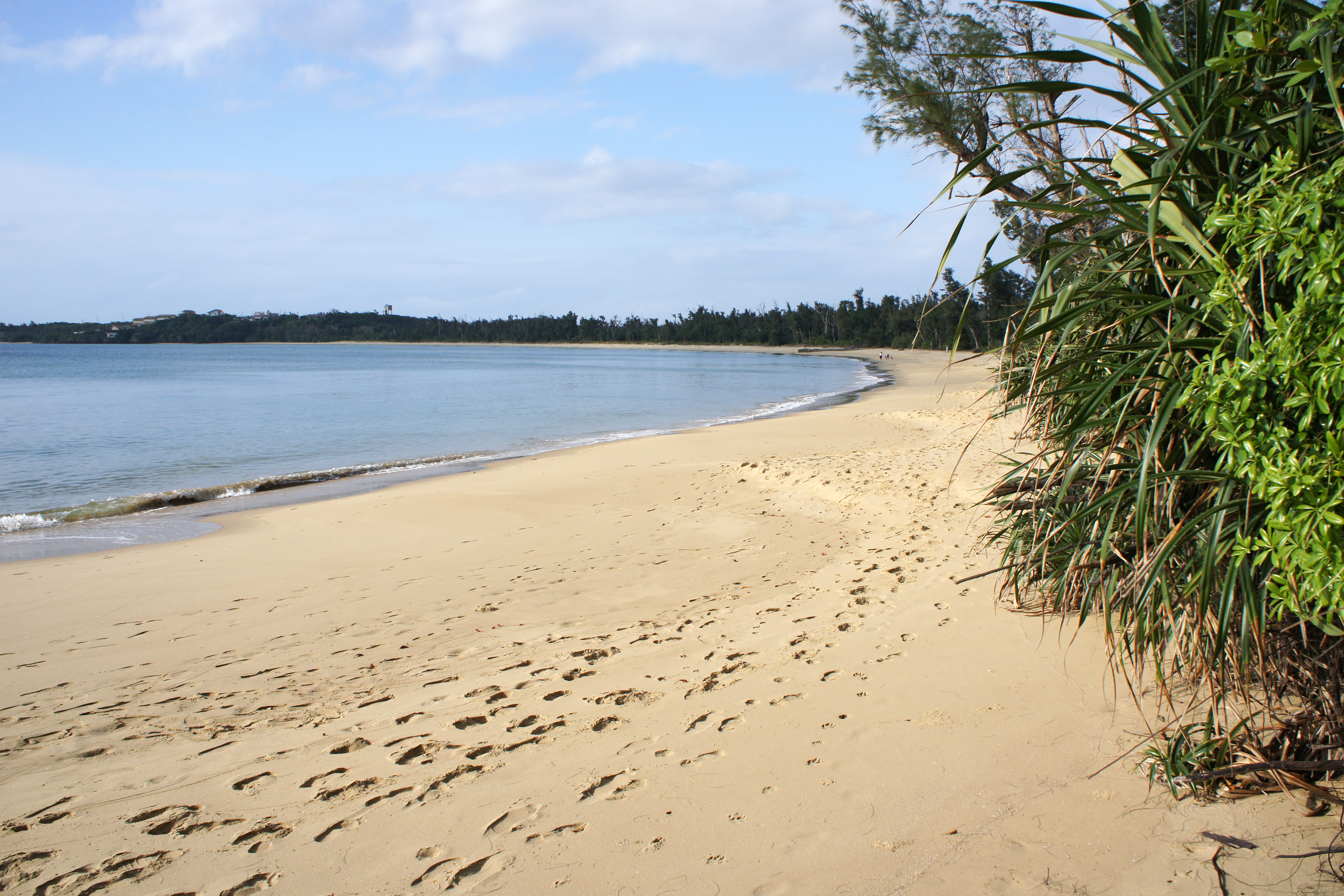
Tsuzumari-no-hama (Tsukigahama Beach)

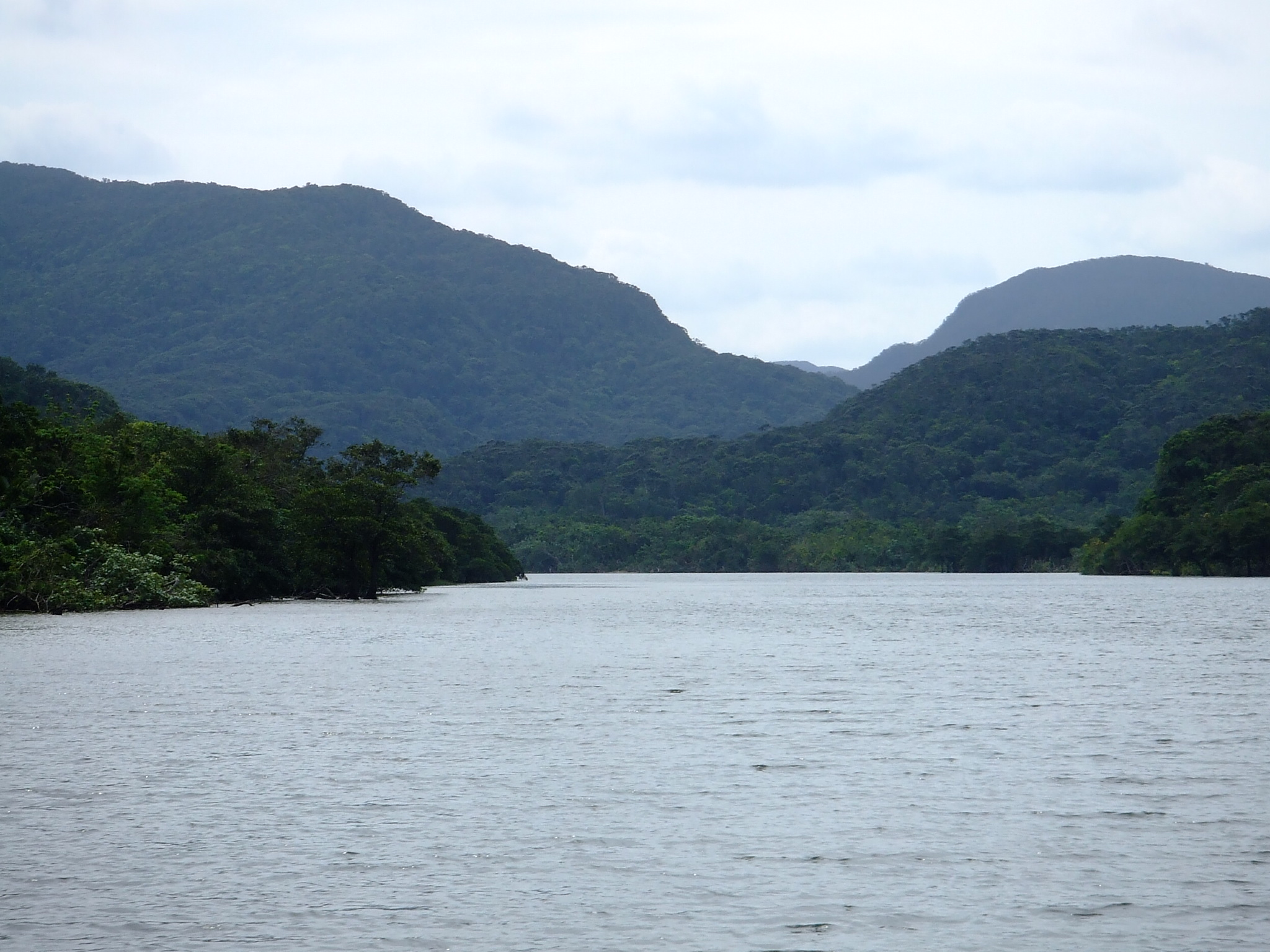
Urauchi-gawa: the longest river in Okinawa

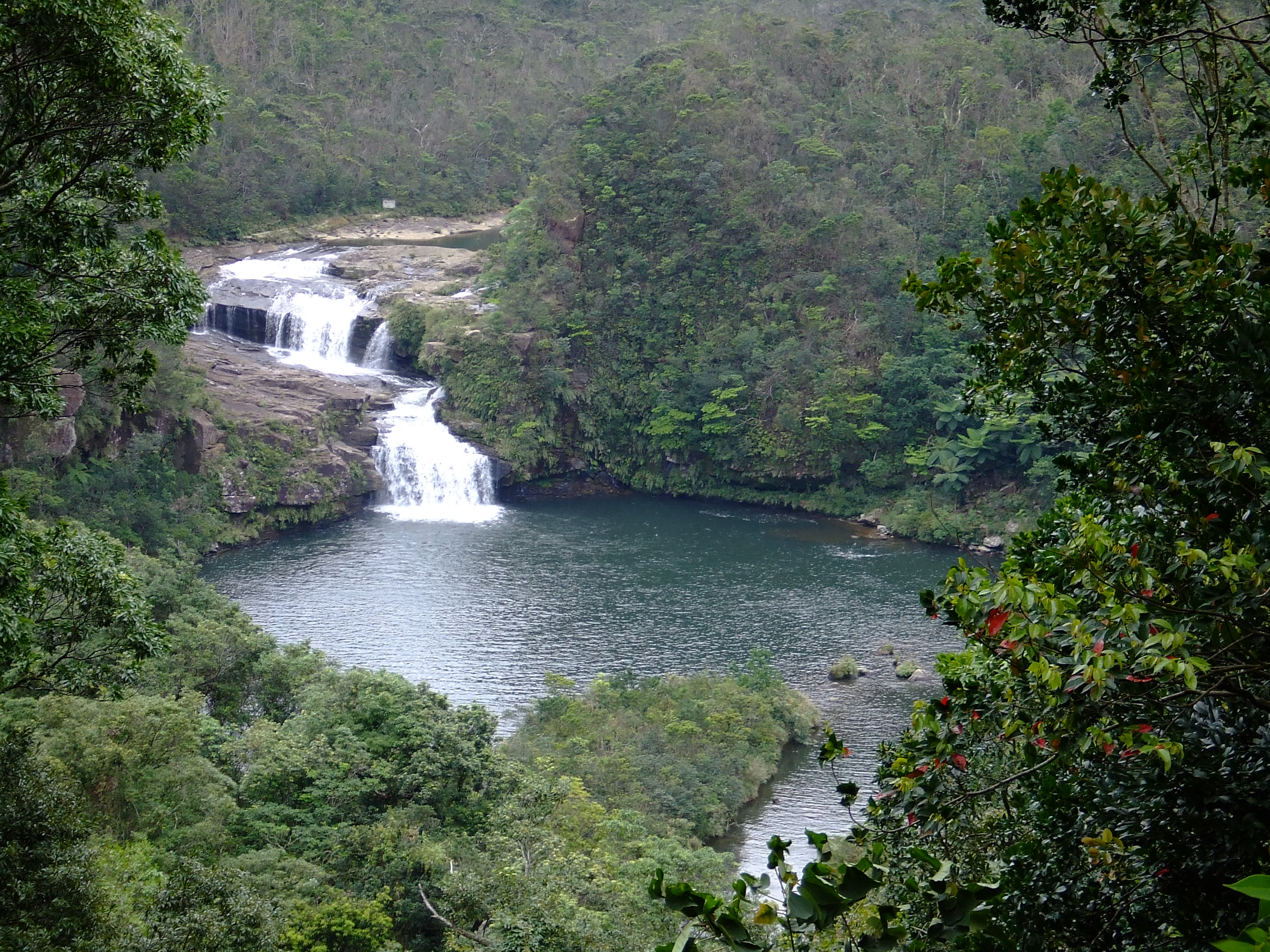
Mariyudō-no-taki: Waterfall on the Urauchi River

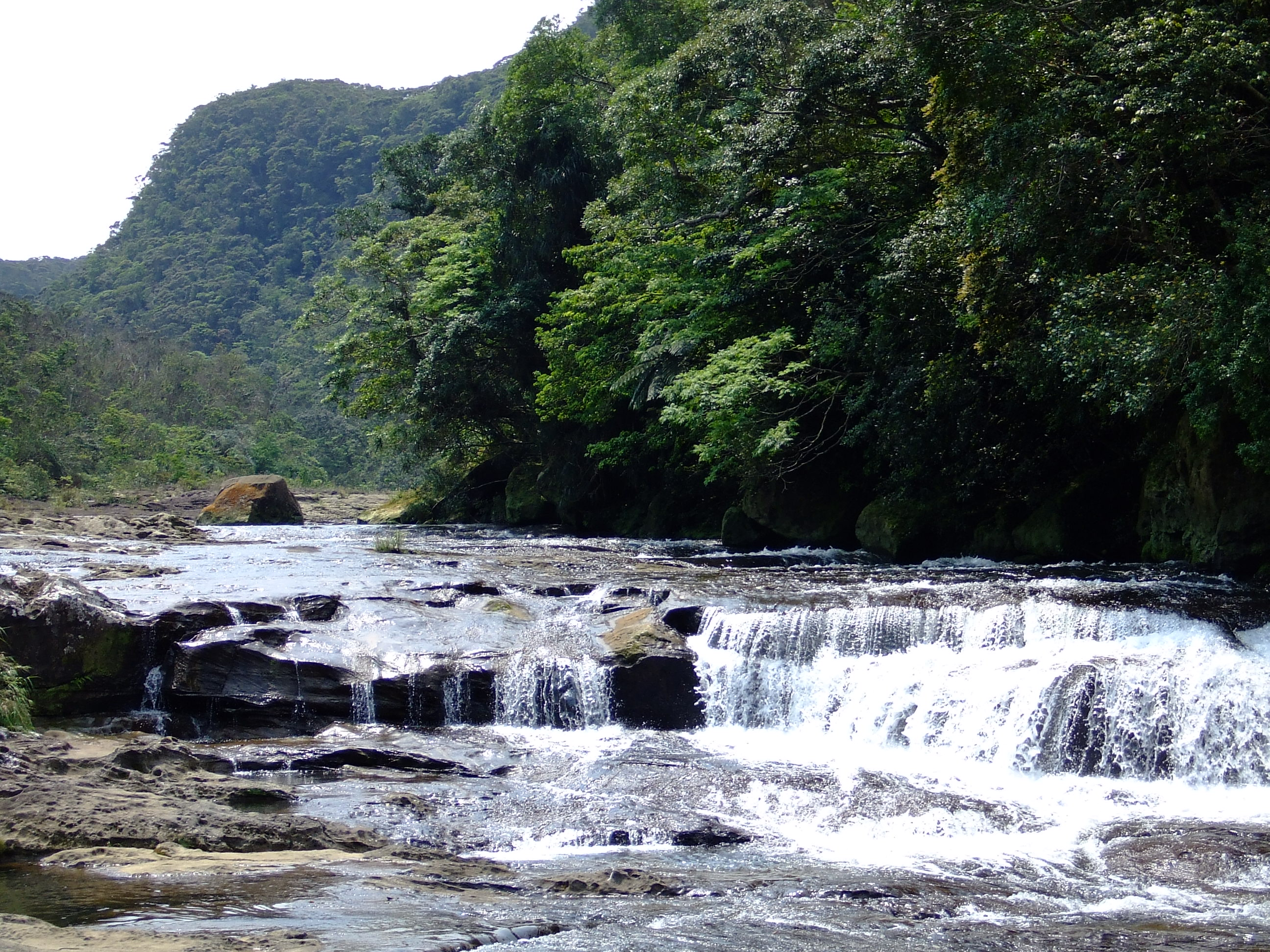
Kampire-no-taki: A section of the Kampire waterfall on the Urauchi River

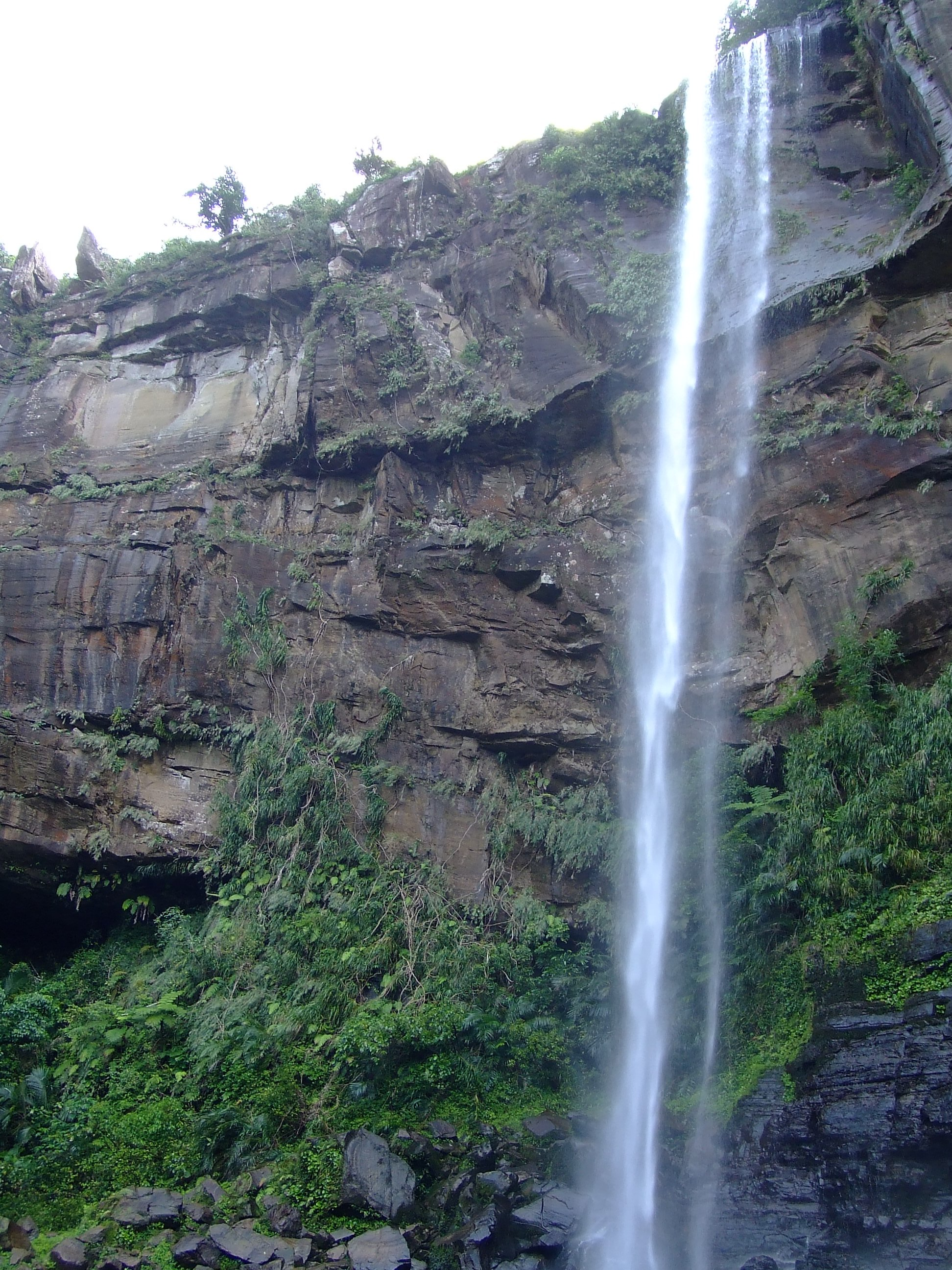
Pinaisara-no-taki: Waterfall on the north of the island

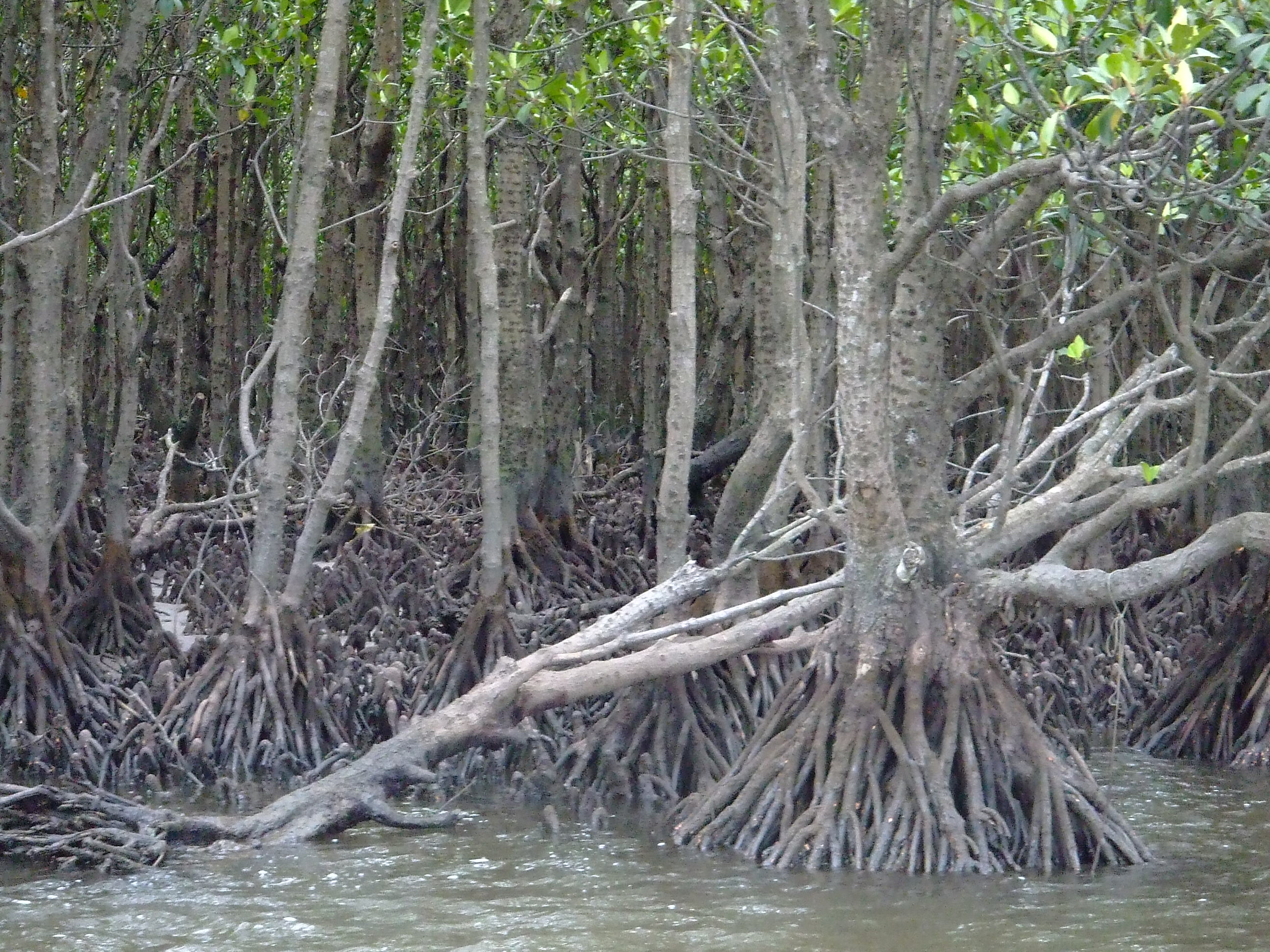
Mangrove on the Nakama River

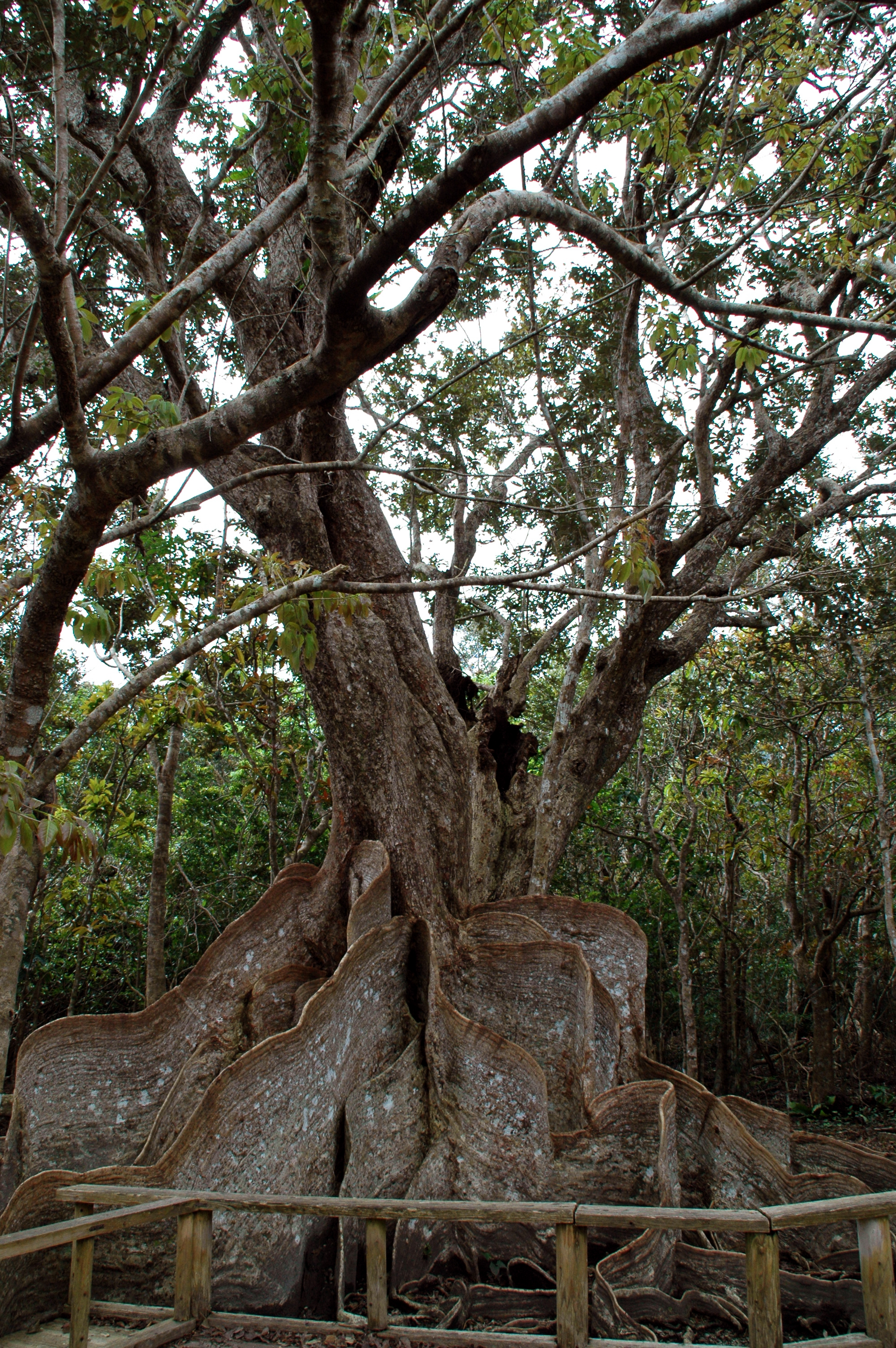
Sakishimasuou tree: Said to be the biggest and oldest mangrove tree in Japan

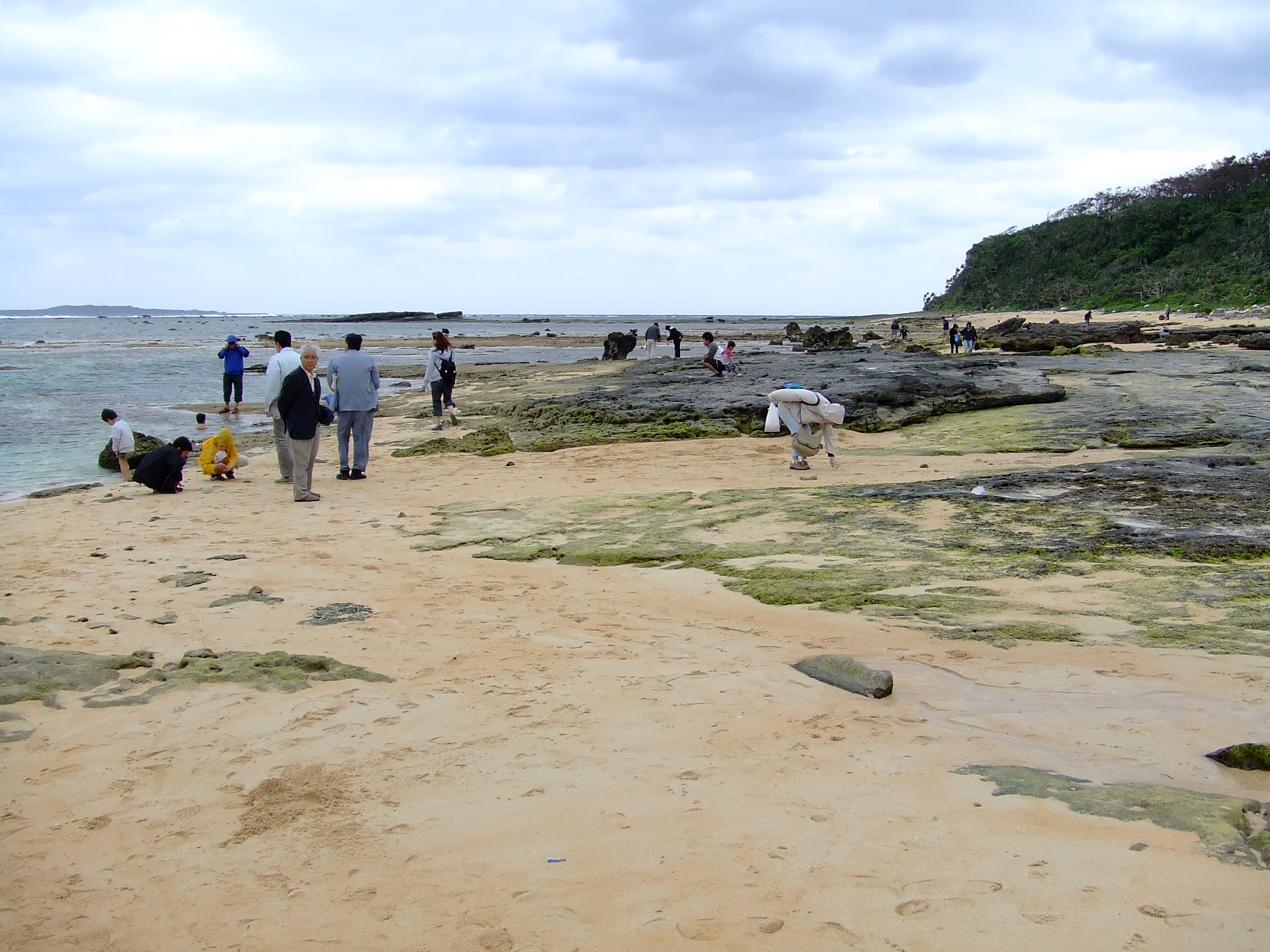
Hoshizuna-no-hama (Star Sand Beach): Beachcombers looking for star-shaped sand grains

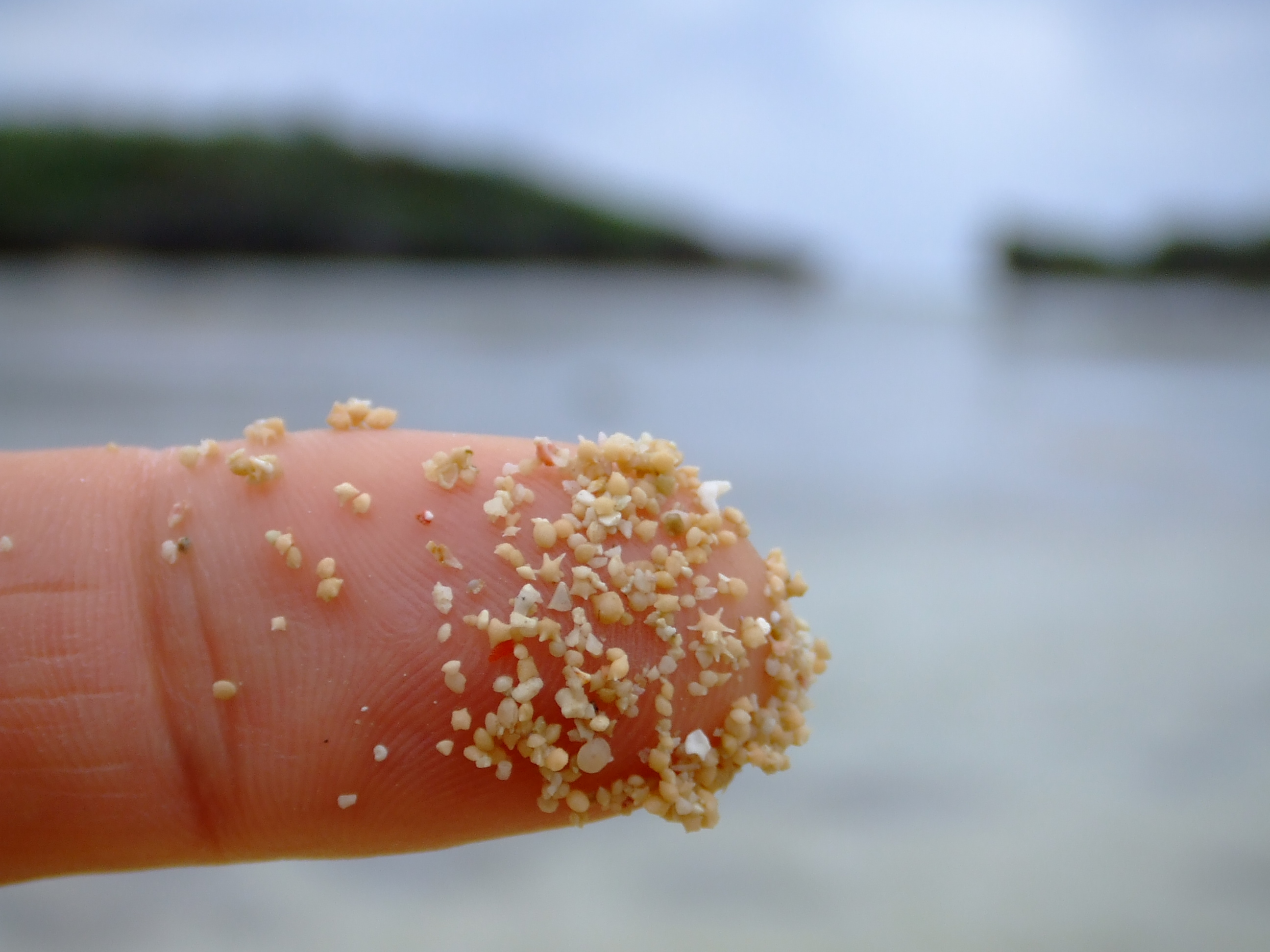
Star sand from Hoshizuna-no-hama: Abraded calcium-carbonate tests of foraminifers from nearby reefs
