= Yonaguni (disambiguation) =

Yonaguni is the island in Japan.

Yonaguni may also refer to:

- Yonaguni, Okinawa
- Yonaguni Airport
- Yonaguni (horse)
- Yonaguni (song)
- Yonaguni language
