= Okinawa International University =

Private university in Ginowan, Okinawa, Japan

- 沖縄国際大学
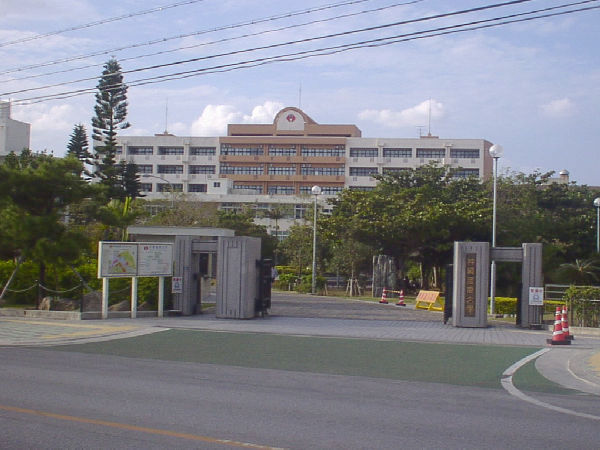
- Main gate of Okinawa International University
- Other names: Okikoku, OKIU
- Former name: Ryūkyū International Junior College
- Motto: 真の自由と、自治の確立
- Motto in English: Striving for Autonomy and True Freedom
- Type: Private
- Established: 1959
- Founder: Koza Gakuen Foundation (財団法人コザ学園)
- Accreditation: Japan University Norma Association (大学基準協会)
- Academic affiliations: University Consortium Okinawa (大学コンソーシアム沖縄)
- President: Hajime Asato
- Vice-president: Masashige Higa
- Academic staff: 202
- Total staff: 278
- Students: 5257
- Undergraduates: 5206
- Postgraduates: 51
- Location: Ginowan 2-6-1, Ginowan, Okinawa Prefecture, 901-2701, Japan; 26°15′43″N 127°45′13″E
- Campus: 116,970.23 square metres (1,259,057.1 sq ft); Urban
- Website: www.okiu.ac.jp

Okinawa International University (沖縄国際大学, Okinawa kokusai daigaku), often abbreviated as Okikokudai (沖国大), Okikoku (沖国) or in English OKIU, is a private university in Ginowan in Okinawa Prefecture, Japan. It was founded in 1959 as a junior college and became a Japanese university in 1972 after the Okinawa Reversion.

As of 1 May 2025, the university counts 5257 students, 202 professors and 76 employees. It has four colleges including ten departments, three graduate schools including five departments and four research institutes.

== History ==
In 1959, while Okinawa is still under U.S. administration, the Koza Gakuen foundation creates the Ryūkyū International Junior College (琉球国際短期大学, Ryūkyū kokusai tanki daigaku).

In 1960, the Koza Gakuen Foundation takes the name of "Ryūkyū International Junior College Foundation". In 1962, the same foundation establishes the "International University", approved by the Government of the Ryukyu Islands, that includes the previously created junior college under the name of International University Junior College (国際大学短期大学部, Kokusai daigaku tanki daigakubu).

In 1967, the foundation is renamed "International School" (国際学園, Kokusai gakuen).

In 1971, within the framework of the Okinawa reversion, the junior college, still a part of the International University, is recognised as a junior college under the Japanese law.

With the reversion, the universities in Okinawa have to comply with the rules established for the Japanese universities, which leads to numerous reorganisations. Public subsidies (1 billion yens) are granted to support those reforms, supplemented by special loans from the Japanese Private Schools Promotion Foundation (440 millions yens). Using those resources, the International University incorporates a part of the Okinawa University (沖縄大学, Okinawa daigaku) to become the current Okinawa International University. At the opening, 493 students, 18 professors and 21 employees are transferred from the Okinawa University while 1315 students, 30 professors and 34 employees come from the International University, with the new addition of 1176 students, 20 professors and 2 employees. As of 1 May 2025, the university counts 5257 students, 202 professors and 76 employees. It has four colleges including ten departments, three graduate schools including five departments and four research institutes.

=== Chronology ===
- 1959 : Creation of the Ryūkyū International Junior College (琉球国際短期大学, Ryūkyū kokusai tanki daigaku) by the Koza Gakuen Foundation
- 1962 : Creation of the International University, approved by the Government of the Ryukyu Islands
- 1972
  - 24 February : Approbation of the Okinawa International University by the Private Universities Committee of the Government of the Ryukyu Islands
  - 25 February : Merger of the International University with part of the Okinawa University to create the Okinawa International University
  - 1 April : Opening of the Okinawa International University Junior College, as part of Okinawa International University
  - 23 April : First start-of-the-school-year ceremony, coupled with the university opening ceremony
  - 15 May : With the reversion, the university is approved by the Japanese Ministry of Education (for the Department of Law of the College of Law, the Departments of Japanese Literature, of English Literature and of Social Sciences of the College of Literature and the Departments of Economic Sciences and of Trade of the College of Management and Economy)
- 1973 : Inauguration of buildings No. 3 and No. 5
- 1974 : Inauguration of the main building, of the library and of the gymnasium
- 1978 : Creation of the Institute of Ryukyuan Culture
- 1980 : Inauguration of building No. 7
- 1985 : Inauguration of the extra-curricular activities building
- 1986 : Inauguration of building No. 9
- 1988 : Inauguration of the social centre
- 1991 : Creation of the Institute of General Industrial Research
- 1992 : Inauguration of new building No. 5
- 1995
  - Shut down of the second College of Letters and of the College of Education
  - Inauguration du International Relations Centre and of the Information Centre
- 1997
  - Creation of the Graduate School of Regional Culture, Department of Ryukyuan Culture
  - Creation of the Okinawa Institute of Law and Politics
- 1998
  - Creation of the Graduate School of Regional Business and Economics, Department of Regional Industry
  - Inauguration of the Foreign Langages Centre and of the new library (building No. 12)
- 1999
  - Creation of the Graduate School of Regional Culture, Department of British and American Studies
  - Shut down of the Okinawa International University Junior College
- 2000 Inauguration of the House of Seminars
- 2001
  - Reorganisation of the departments of Japanese Literature, of English Literature, and of Sociology of the Faculty of Literature into the Departments of Japanese Language and Culture, of British and American Languages and Cultures, and of Social Sciences and Regional Culture of the College of Global and Regional Culture
  - Creation of the Department of Human Welfare of the College of Global and Regional Culture
- 2002
  - The "First College of Law" is renamed "College of Law"
  - Reorganisation of the Department of Law of the College of Law into the Department of Legal Studies
  - Addition of a Department of Regional Administration to the College of Law
- 2003
  - Creation of the Graduate School of Law, Department of Law
  - Creation of the Graduate School of Regional Culture, Department of Human Welfare
  - Inauguration of the new gymnasium, of the Extension Centre and of the counselling service
- 2004
  - Creation of the Departments of Economics and of Regional Economics and Environmental Policy of the College of Economics and Environmental Policy and of the Departments of Business Administration and of Industry and Information Science of the College of Industry and Information Science
  - 13 August : A helicopter from Marine Corps Air Station Futenma crashes on Building No. 1
- 2006: Inauguration of the new main building
- 2008
  - Shut down of the Second College of Law
  - Adoption of a system with vice-presidency
- 2009
  - Shut down of the Second College of Management and Economics
  - Inauguration of building No. 13
- 2011 : Shut down of the First College of Management and Economics
- 2016 : Inauguration of new building No. 3
- 2021 : Inauguration of the students' meetings building

== Colleges and Graduate School ==
=== Colleges ===
- College of Law
  - Department of Legal Studies
  - Department of Regional Administration
- College of Economics
  - Departement of Economics
  - Department of Regional Economics and Environmental Policy
- College of Industry and Information Science
  - Department of Business Administration
  - Department of Industry and Information Science
- College of Global and Regional Culture
  - Department of Japanese Culture
  - Department of British and American Cultures
  - Department of Social Sciences
  - Department of Human Welfare
    - Social Welfare major
    - Counseling major

=== Graduate Schools ===
- Graduate School of Regional Culture
  - Department of Ryūkyūan Culture
  - Department of British and American Languages and Cultures
  - Department of Human Welfare
- Graduate School of Regional Business and Economics
  - Department of Regional Business and Economics
- Graduate School of Law
  - Department of Law

=== Junior Colleges ===
- Okinawa International University Junior College (shut down in 1999)

=== Associated Institutes ===
- International Relations Centre
- Information Centre
- Foreign Languages Centre
- Institute of Ryukyuan Culture
- Institute of General Industrial Research
- Okinawa Institute of Law and Politics

== Presidence ==
1. 1972-1976 Genshū Asato
2. 1976-1980 Genshū Asato
3. 1980-1984 Genshū Asato
4. 1984-1988 Hiroe Takamiya
5. 1988-1992 Takematsu Kakazu
6. 1992-1996 Yoshiharu Heshiki
7. 1996-2000 Yoshiharu Heshiki
8. 2000-2004 Isao Namihira
9. 2004-2008 Tomoaki Toguchi
10. 2008-2012 Moritake Tomikawa
11. 2012-2016 Tamotsu Ōshiro
12. 2016-2020 Eiken Maetsu
13. 2020-2024 Eiken Maetsu
14. 2024-2028 Hajime Asato

== External relations ==
=== University credits equivalence system ===
Okinawa International University has agreements for equivalence of credits with several universities in Okinawa Prefecture and in Japan.

==== Universities in Okinawa Prefecture ====
- Okinawa University
- Okinawa Christian University
- Okinawa Women's Junior College

==== Other Japanese universities ====
- Daito Bunka University
- Matsuyama University
- Kyoto University of Advanced Science
- J. F. Oberlin University
- Kumamoto Gakuen University
- Meijo University
- Open University of Japan
- Sapporo Gakuin University

=== International Exchange Programmes ===
Okinawa International University has agreements for exchange programmes with universities in ten different countries.

- Australia
  - Macquarie University
- Canada
  - Vancouver Island University
- China
  - Tianjin Foreign Studies University
  - University of Macau
- France
  - Rennes 2 University
- Germany
  - Osnabrück University
- South Korea
  - Gachon University
  - Hannam University
  - Pukyong National University
- Spain
  - University of León
- Taiwan
  - Tunghai University
- United States of America
  - Henderson State University
  - Southern Utah University
- Vietnam
  - FPT University

=== Collaborations ===
==== In Okinawa Prefecture ====
- 1997 : Agreement with the village of Higashi concerning the construction of Okinawa International University House of Seminars
- 2014 : Foundation of the University Consortium Okinawa (大学コンソーシアム沖縄), including Okinawa Prefecture's universities, junior colleges and colleges of technology (高等専門学校) (eleven schools)
- 2017 : Agreement of collaboration with Ginowan City Board of Education
- 2017 : Agreement of collaboration with the Okinawa Accountants Association
- 2019 : Agreement of cooperation with Japan Transocean Air and Ryūkyū Air Commuter
- 2020 : Agreement of collaboration with the city of Ginowan

==== International Collaborations ====
- 1994 : International Academic Seminar Okinawa – South Korea
- 1997 : Agreement of international collaboration between the Institute of Ryukyuan Culture and the Honam Studies Research Center of Chonnam National University (South Korea)
- 2002 : Agreement of academic collaboration between the Institute of Ryukyuan Culture and the Institute for China-Ryukyu Relations of the Fujian Normal University (China)
- 2003 : International symposium "Okinawa in the context of globalisation"

=== Affiliations, certifications ===
- 1997 : Approved as a permanent member of the Japan University Norma Association (大学基準協会)
- 2005 : Certified as complying to the university evaluation norma by the Japan University Norma Association
- 2009 : Agreement with the Study Abroad Foundation concerning international student exchanges
- 2010 : Obtention of the "Eco-action 21" certification

=== Former partnerships ===
- Baylor University
- Xiamen University
- Cairo University
- Ulster University
- Nation University (Thailand)

== Personalities associated to the university ==
=== Professors and former professors ===
- Masaaki Aniya – Historian
- Yasuo Kurima – Historian of Okinawa
- Masakazu Kuzuwata – Professor of the department of Japanese culture of the College of global and regional culture, Japanese medieval literature
- Hiromori Maedomari – Professor of the department of regional economics and environmental policy of the College of economics, theories on Okinawan economy
- Yoshirō Tamanoi – Economist
- Hiroyuki Teruya – Political analyst
- Moritake Tomikawa – Economist, former vice-governor of Okinawa

=== Alumni ===
==== Politics ====
- Shukichi Hokama – Former mayor of Yonaguni
- Shōkichi Kina – Musician, former member of the House of Councillors
- Yasukuni Kinjō – Member of the House of Representatives, former member of the Okinawa Prefecture Assembly
- Toshio Shimabuku – Former mayor of Uruma

==== Academia ====
- Naoki Kawamitsu – Economist and historian, professor at the Doshisha University

==== Arts ====
- Kōhei Ariwaka – Painter
- Ryūichi Ishikawa – Photograph

==== Show business ====
- Kōsuke Emori – Comedian
- Higamoeru – Comedian
- Hīpū – Comedian
- Asano Irei – Singer
- Shin'ya Kinjō – Comedian
- Atsuko Kyan – Model
- Takako Miyahira – Film director
- Kazuhiro Taira – Film director
- Kiyosaku Uezu (Mongol800) – Musician

==== Sports ====
- Yukihide Gibo – Footballer
- Ken Ishikawa – Former footballer
- Arata Kinjō – Karateka, double gold medal at the Karate World Championships
- Ryō Kiyuna – karateka, gold medal at the 2020 Olympic Games
- Riku Nagahama – Boxer
- Masato Tomoyose – Professional baseball referee
- Takuya Uemura – Karateka, double gold medal at the Karate World Championships

==== Media ====
- Ryūtarō Miyata – Radio presenter
- Kazumasa Ōta – Radio presenter
- Ayako Sakihama – Meteorologist
- Taiga Yoshimi – Radio and television presenter
