= Cape Irizaki =

Westernmost point of Japan, on the island of Yonaguni

Cape Irizaki 西崎 Irizaki
- Cape
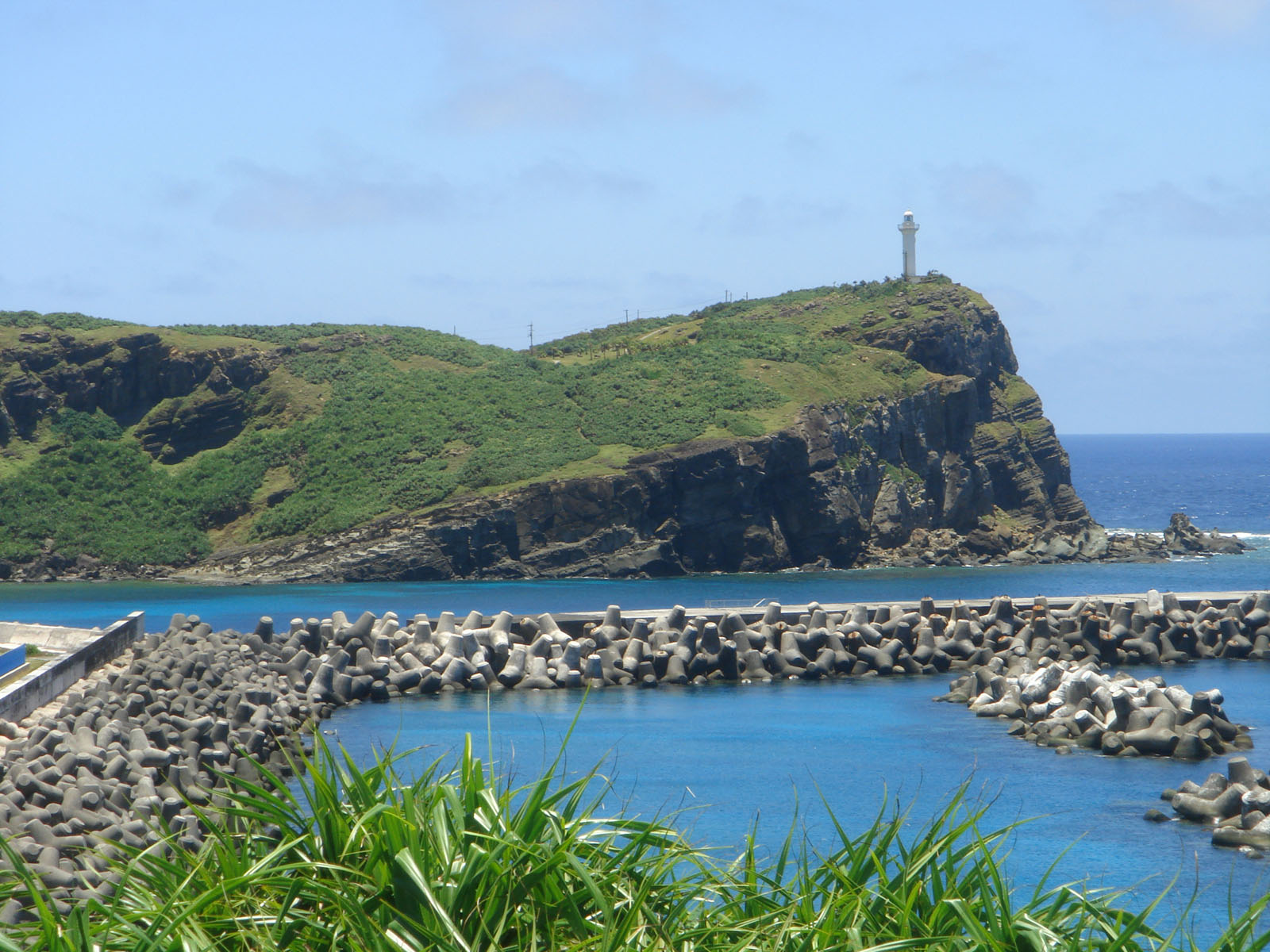
- Cape Irizaki

- Location within Okinawa Prefecture Location within Japan
- Coordinates: 24°26′58″N 122°56′01″E
- Location: Yonaguni, Okinawa, Japan
- Water bodies: East China Sea

Area
  - Total: 0.3 km^{2} (0.12 sq mi)
- Elevation: 50 m (160 ft)

Cape Irizaki (西崎, Irizaki; Yonaguni: Iridati) is at the western tip of Yonaguni Island, itself the westernmost island of Japan. Located approximately 120 m northwest of the cape is Tuishi, a rocky formation that is the westernmost point of Japan. The cape is within the town of Yonaguni, Okinawa.

There is a lighthouse, an observation platform, and a monument titled "Monument of the Westernmost Point of Japan" (日本最西端の碑, Nihon Saiseitan no Ishibumi) on the cape. Tourists gather at the cape daily to see the final sunset in Japan.

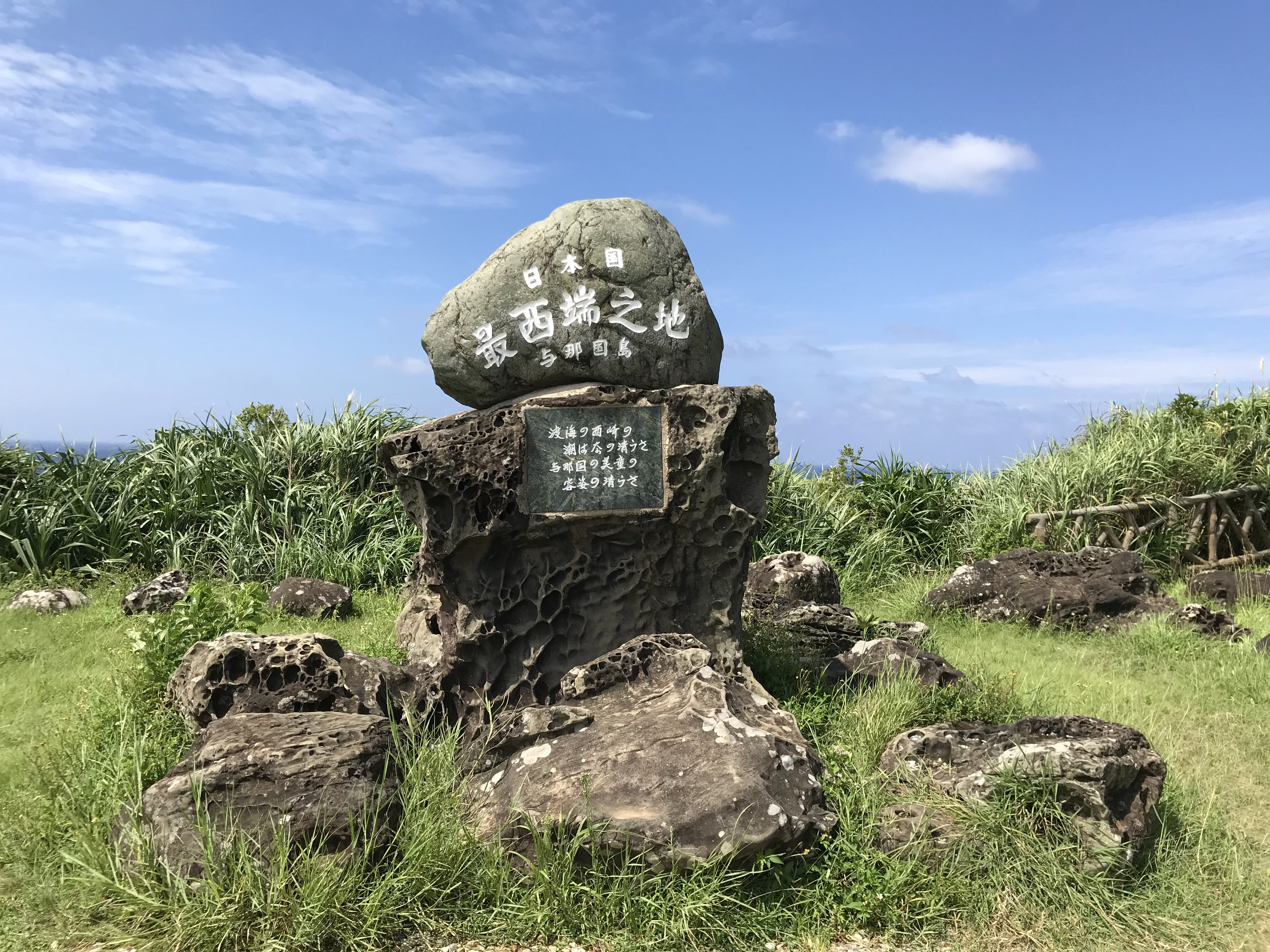
Monument for Japan's westernmost point

== Geography ==
Cape Irizaki is 0.37 kilometres (0.23 mi) wide, 0.7 kilometres (0.43 mi) long, and juts into the East China Sea northwest from Yonaguni Island. The cape reaches a height of 50 metres (164 ft), and is surrounded by sea cliffs. Taiwan, which is 107.4 kilometres (58 nmi; 67 mi) to the west at its closest point, is visible on a clear day. Kubara hill [191.5 metres (628 ft)] and its homonymous fishing port and settlement are visible to the east of the cape. The Black Current flows west of Cape Irizaki to the north, and is a rich fishing ground for marlin and skipjack tuna.

Cape Irizaki, like much of the Yaeyama Islands, is composed of sandstone and mudstone. The cape is devoid of trees due to constant strong winds. Unlike other areas of the Yaeyama Islands, Cape Irizaki is surrounded by very little coral reef.

== History ==
Cape Irizaki is first mentioned in Shōhō Kuniezu, a kuniezu, or series of Japanese provincial land maps created during the Edo period (1603 – 1868). The Shōhō Kuniezu, which was compiled beginning in 1644, lists the cape as "Ire no Zaki". The cape was considered the westernmost point of Japan in 1879, when Japan annexed the Ryukyu Kingdom.

== Transportation ==
Cape Irizaki is open to the public, and is easily accessible on foot from the settlement of Kuburadake. The cape is approximately one hour by bus from Yonaguni Airport.

== See also ==
- Extreme points of Japan
