= OWJC =

OWJC may refer to:

- Okazaki Women's Junior College
- Okinawa Women's Junior College
