= Tabaru River =

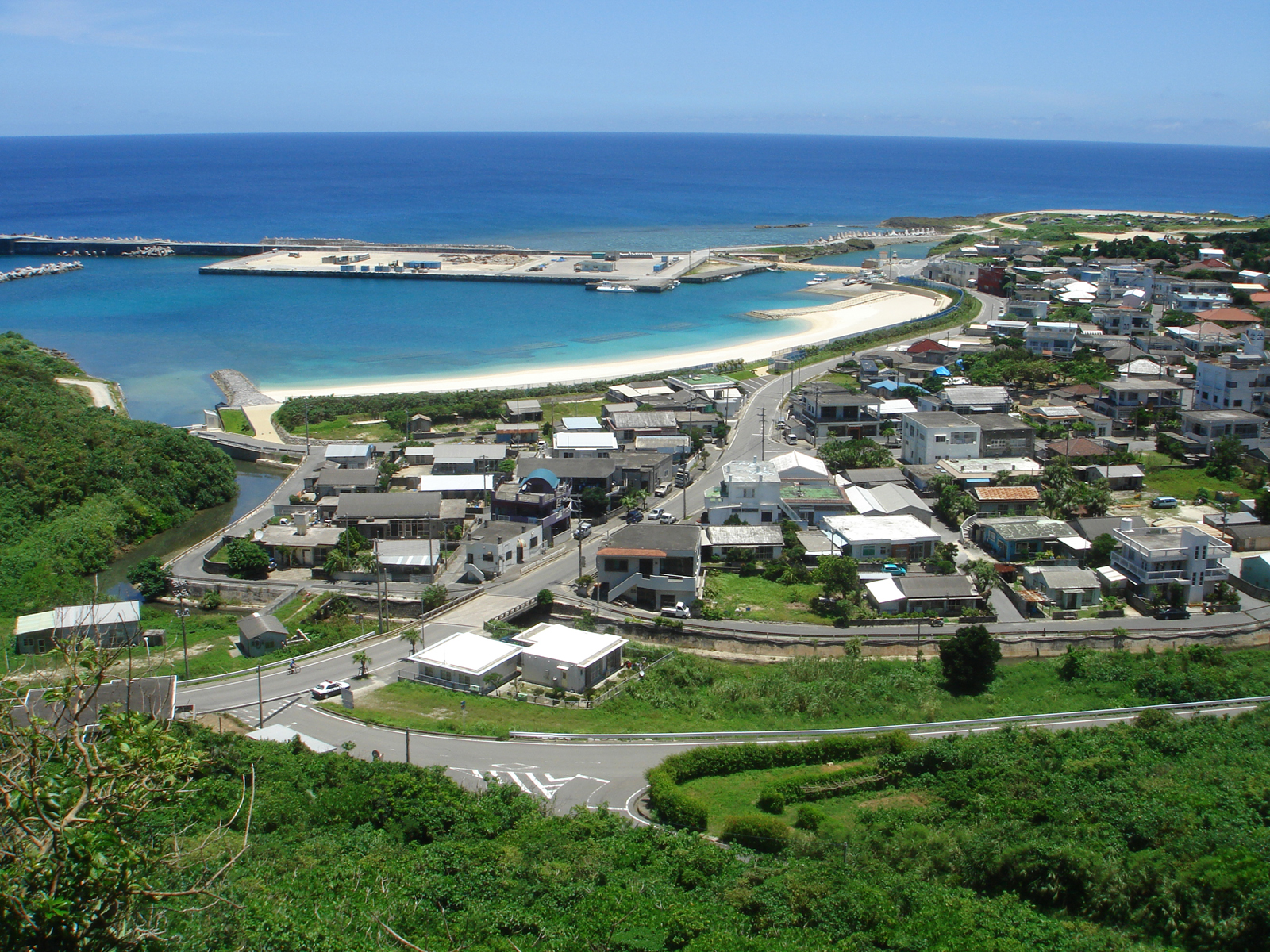
- The community of Sonai, with the river's mouth on the left

Location
- Country: Japan
- Prefecture: Okinawa Prefecture
- Town: Yonaguni

Physical characteristics
- Source: Spring
  - location: Mount Urabu
- Mouth: East China Sea
  - location: Sonai, Yonaguni
  - coordinates: 24°28′12″N 122°59′57″E
- Length: 1.29 km (0.80 mi)
- Basin size: 7.1 km^{2} (2.7 sq mi)

The Tabaru River (Japanese: 田原川; Tabarugawa) is a stream on Yonaguni, the westernmost island of the Yaeyama Islands in Japan. It runs from a spring on Mount Urabu, the highest point on the island and drains a region of forests in its upper portions, running north through a region of wetlands and rice paddies before meeting the East China Sea at the settlement of Sonai. An intake weir on the upper course of the river provides water for the surrounding community.

== Description ==
The Tabaru River runs for about 1.29 kilometres (0.80 mi) through northeastern Yonaguni, the westernmost island of the Yaeyama Islands and Japan. It has a drainage area of 7.1 km^{2} (2.7 sq mi).

The river originates from a spring on Mount Urabu, the highest point on the island. It flows north through a forested area around Mount Urabu and nearby Mount Inbi, part of the Yonaguni Wildlife Protection Area, before entering a terraced area, with a stretch of wetland along its western bank and farmland and rice paddies on its east. This area has been designated as a protected wetland by the Ministry of the Environment. A small tributary stream flows into the river from the east. At the end of its course, the stream flows through residential areas in the community of Sonai before draining into the East China Sea at Nanta Beach.

The island has a subtropical oceanic climate, receiving about 2,400 mm (94 in) of rain per year, with an average annual temperature of 24 °C (75 °F).

The geology of the region surrounding the Tabaru River largely consists of the Yaeyama Formation sandstone, alluvial deposits, and limestone. An intake weir on the upper course of the river provides water for residential, industrial, and agricultural use. A graben (depression in the local crust) about 0.5 to 1 km (0.3 to 0.6 mi) stretches through the central portion of the island for about 6 km (3.7 mi), creating an area of wetland where it intersects with the upper reaches of the Tabaru.

=== Biology ===
The riparian forest provides a habitat for the Kishinoue's giant skink, a nationally protected species. Patches of bulrush in the wetlands provide habitat for gobies and halfbeaks, while the upper reaches of the river host giant mottled eels. The estuary contains rare species of algae such as Dichotomosiphon tuberosus, Caloglossa ogasawaraensis, and Bostrychia simpliciuscula. A new species of algae, Ulva limnetica was discovered in the river and described in 2009. Softshell turtles, crucian carp, loaches, and shellfish were formerly found in the river, but were expatriated due to environmental damage. Invasive tilapia and the freshwater snail Pomacea maculata have contributed to decreased biodiversity.

A mangrove forest of Rhizophora stylosa trees covers about 0.18 ha (0.44 acres) of wetland in the lower portion of the river. It is the westernmost mangrove forest in Japan, and serves as a habitat for birds, freshwater snails and fiddler crab.

=== History ===
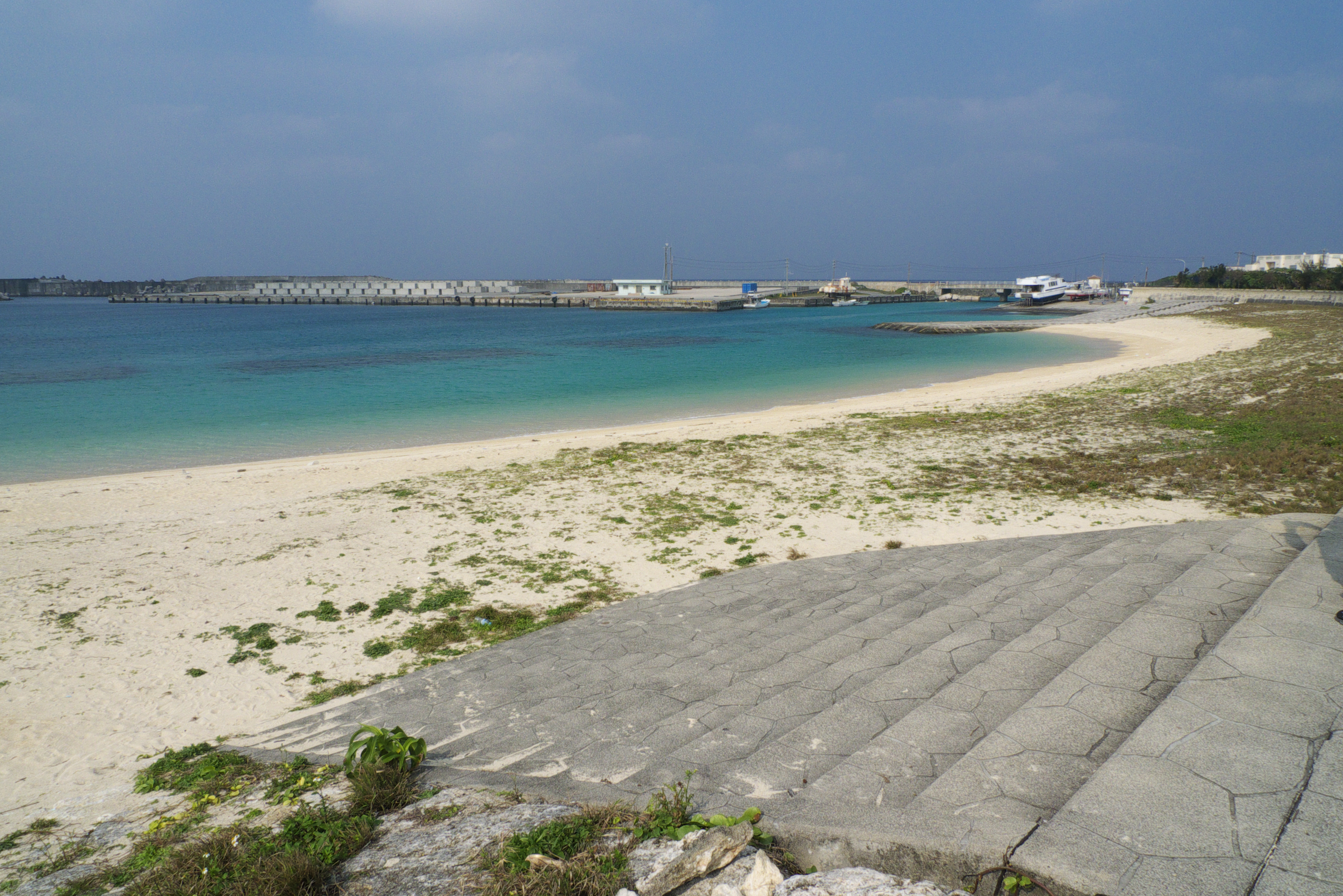
Nanta Beach, overlooking the Port of Sonai and the mouth of the Tabaru River

Archaeological finds along the River near Sonai have uncovered the remains of a settlement from the protohistorical period, featuring locally made pottery and imported ceramics, alongside human bones.

The river was traditionally used for irrigation, drinking water, and as a place to wash clothes and potatoes. The ugan (shrine) of Tumai-ugan is located near the mouth of the river, consisting of a concrete shrine with vases and incense burners, traditionally used to pray for safe voyages. The religious ceremony of Aramidi (アラミディ; 'new water') is held near the source of the river at Mount Urabu at the beginning of the 8th lunar month, where practitioners pray for the renewal of the water and a bountiful harvest. The river is cleaned to accompany the ceremony.

In 1889, a large group of islanders altered the course of the river, channeling its mouth into a specific location to prevent flooding. During the 1960s, agricultural irrigation canals were built along the right bank of the middle reaches of the Tabaru. This resulted in the river being rerouted, bypassing a stretch of wetlands it previously passed through. The banks of the lower reaches were renovated in the 1970s, alongside the construction of a sluice gate at the river's mouth.

In 2008, slow-moving Typhoon Sinlaku caused the river to flood, damaging 53 houses and destroying the intake weir of an adjacent sugar factory. In 2011, the Tabaru River was designated by the Ministry of Land, Infrastructure, Transport and Tourism as a Class 2 River, becoming the only such river on Yonaguni. A quarry near the river's source presents a potential environmental concern for the region, especially if it is expanded.
