= Ryuichi Ishikawa =

Japanese photographer (born 1984)

- Born: 1984 (age 41–42); Okinawa Prefecture, Japan
- Education: Okinawa International University.
- Known for: Photography

Ryuichi Ishikawa (石川 竜一, Ishikawa Ryūichi; b. 1984) is an Okinawan photographer. In his youth, Ishikawa suffered from depression, leading him to withdraw from mainstream society and turn towards the alternative, underground communities that later became frequent subjects in his photography. Ishikawa serendipitously found photography and photograms in his twenties which he used to document his immediate surroundings and visualize his emotions and dreams. As his practice developed under the guidance of his mentor Tetsushi Yuzaki, Ishikawa increasingly saw photography as a means to both communicate with the outside world and find meaning in life.

He rose to prominence in the contemporary Japanese art scene during the mid-2010s with his raw scenes of daily life in his hometown and straightforward portraits of people in Okinawa, including many of those on the fringes of society. For these photographs, Ishikawa received the esteemed Kimura Ihei award in 2014 and the Photographic Society of Japan Newcomer's Award the following year.

Ishikawa is primarily a self-taught photographer with a rapidly evolving, instinctual shooting practice. Over the course of his career, he has also experimented with genres such as abstraction, snapshot photography, landscape, and most recently, outdoor still life. Since 2015, Ishikawa has been traveling into the wilderness and photographing his expeditions.

== Early life ==
Ishikawa was born and raised in Ginowan, Okinawa. Ishikawa began competitive boxing as a junior high school student and dedicated his adolescent years to a strict and isolating training regiment. He became a nationally recognized youth boxer and won third place at the 2002 National Sports Festival held in Koichi. Despite his relative success, Ishikawa abandoned his boxing career upon entering Okinawa International University, where he studied in the department of Society and Regional Culture. His leave was motivated by concerns over the meager chances to sustain a living through boxing and the lack of career opportunities for those who left the profession. Ishikawa consequently suffered from depression throughout the remainder of his teens and early twenties due to his loss of direction in life and his inability to easily integrate back into 'normal' society after retiring. As he struggled in university, Ishikawa spent his nights partying and drinking with friends, congregating in areas infamous for the youth delinquents and bōsōzoku gatherings.

== Photography career ==
Ishikawa first engaged with photography as a college student though he never received a formal arts education. His impromptu venture into photography started at the age of 20, when a thrift shop owner called out to Ishikawa on the street and offered him a heavily discounted Olympus Trip 35 camera. Although the camera turned out to be broken, Ishikawa developed an interest in photography and following his graduation in 2006, he briefly worked for a camera store. After being fired, Ishikawa moved between mainland Japan and Okinawa taking on seasonal work at automobile factories, host clubs, and bars, and spent his early twenties living very modestly in order to finance his photography. During this period, Ishikawa met the Okinawan avant-garde dancer Seiryū Shiba. Ishikawa first encountered Shiba in 2008 and later joined his dance troupe, albeit begrudgingly, in exchange for permission to photograph their activities. These images became the subject of his first two photobooks, SHIBA 踊る惑星 (2010) and しば正龍 女形の魅力 (2013).

=== Early introspective photographs: 2004–2008 ===
Outside of his Shiba photographs, Ishikawa's early works primarily consisted of abstracted, introspective film photographs and works on photographic paper that were heavily manipulated in dark rooms. Ishikawa's move towards abstraction was born from an early realization that numerous non tangible circumstances (the time of day, the surroundings, one's emotions, what you ate that day, etc.) critically influenced one's perception of an image— when printing his photographs he noticed that the images he saw in the viewfinder when shooting seemed to differ once they were developed. In an attempt to more accurately convey the image, and associated emotions felt at the time of shooting, Ishikawa began investing time into transforming the image within the development process, such as compiling different photographs into a single print to make composite images. The resulting abstract works appeared to Ishikawa as unconscious manifestations of his childhood dreams. Motivated by the discovery, Ishikawa became intensely focused on altering photographs and experimented with a range of manipulations including, assembling collages, creating photograms, painting on prints with developer, and soaking prints in solvent for long periods of time. By the time the Ishikawa created the series Brain Portraits (2006-2008) and ryu-graph (2006-2008), which contained works so heavily distorted that many no longer registered as photographs, Ishikawa was spending most of his time in the dark room and seldom engaged in shooting more photographs.

=== Street snapshots: 2008–2010 ===
After the completion of his ryu-graph series, Ishikawa was dissatisfied with the direction of his work and its singularly introspective focus. In the late 2000s, he decided to step away from the dark room and took up shooting again, this time with his camera directed at his immediate surroundings. Ishikawa often brought his camera to nights out drinking and aimlessly photographed his outsider circle of friends in clubs and parking lots.

For Ishikawa, these spaces were one of the few platforms for his group to discuss and present their work, as their lack of education and connections rendered them nonexistent to the rest of the world. His snapshots from this time were unabashedly provocative, featuring scenes of sex, drinking, clubs, bike gangs, and partying all captured under the cover of night. Ishikawa assembled the photos into a small, zine-like photo book titled Adrenamix (2015). The word "adrenamix" was devised by Ishikawa to describe the intensity and frustration pent up within the numerous types of young people that convened in these nights. Many of the photographs are shot in a rushed, sporadic way that mimic the chaos and energy suggested in his title, including blurred images Ishikawa took while he himself was riding a scooter or bike.

=== Portraits: 2010–2016 ===
From 2010 onwards, Ishikawa's work shifted away from the turbulent snapshots taken of his friends in his early twenties once he began studying under the Okinawan photographer Tetsushi Yuzaki. With a suggestion by Yuzaki to take portraits of Okinawan youth, Ishikawa set out the next two years approaching numerous people on the street and taking their photographs. Ishikawa himself has acknowledged that both he and his work had grown noticeably outward focus under Yuzaki's tutelage.

The subjects of Ishikawa's photos are an indiscriminate mix of elderly people, young people, families, as well as atypical and marginalized members of society: people with tattoos and piercings, trans people, cosplayers, biker gangs, and people living in poverty, among others. For these images, Ishikawa typically shot the subject at eye-level as they maintained relaxed postures and muted facial expressions. The first of Ishikawa's portrait series, titled okinawan portraits, was presented in 2012 and received an honorable mention in the 35th New Cosmos of Photography contest hosted by Canon. The images were later published in his break out books okinawan portraits 2010–2012 (2014) and A Grand Polyphony (2014). The latter publication won the 40th Kimura Ihei Award and propelled Ishikawa into national recognition. When composing a title for A Grand Polyphony, Ishikawa initially thought of "A Grand View" but swapped the last word for polyphony after book planner Tēichi Kimoto's recommendation. The term polyphony was borrowed from Mikhail Bakhtin's Problem of Dostoevsky's Poetics and Ishikawa agreed that the auditory expression resonated more with the photographs.

Ishikawa's highly acclaimed portraits have been lauded for their ability to emphasize the individual character and essence of his subjects, particularly in a time when singular faces tend to serve as the symbolic representatives of larger sub-groups. Art critic Minoru Shimizu has also stated that Ishikawa's handling of portraits "finally frees a realistic, that is to say, identity-free, Okinawa from the magnetic field of identity politics."

In interviews, Ishikawa has generally steered away from offering any one explicit meaning to his photographs, although he concedes that there are socio-political tensions which one might read into his work. For publications such as A Grand Polyphony and okinawan portraits 2012-2016, Ishikawa wrote directly about the negative impact of imperialistic and capitalist greed on Okinawan society and the world at large. In the postscripts of these books, Ishikawa specifically lamented over the inability for his generation (the people he often photographs) to free themselves from the destruction of these consuming forces. However Ishikawa has suggested that the acceptance of the present and confirmation one's own existence through representational media, such as photography, can act as a form of resistance.

Ishikawa has insisted that these topics arise from photographs, rather than serving as the motivation to take photographs. His reason for photographing Okinawan people specifically is not a desire to make a statement about Okinawa but rather a simple coincidence of him living there at that time and having been there his whole life. Since his early snapshots, Ishikawa's shooting method has remained relatively spontaneous and not bounded by conceptual meaning. Ishikawa decides to shoot something or someone based on an instinctual feeling. Ishikawa has stated that photography is a means for him to be "honest", shooting only when an intense emotion compels him to do so. Only in the aftermath of shooting and viewing his pictures in sum does Ishikawa typically start to grasp the meaning of his work.

=== Nature photographs: 2015–2021 ===
Although Ishikawa spent the majority of his career shooting in city areas, in 2016 he released the publication CAMP which was composed entirely of photos set in nature. For the series, Ishikawa joined mountaineer Bunsho Hattori on two expeditions taken from 2015 to 2016: one along the Sai River in Ishikawa prefecture and another at the Waga Mountains in Akita prefecture. Over the span of several days, the two hunted and foraged with minimal camping equipment. This new endeavor arose from a prompt by SLANT gallery owner and publisher Seiji Himura for Ishikawa to attempt something completely different from his portraits. In stark contrast to his earlier work, CAMP featured no people, but rather consisted of landscapes and camping scenes. Ishikawa has admitted that photographing within the new environment was notably challenging for him, as his lack of knowledge about nature left him disoriented when shooting. Unable to discern amongst the immense nature he was surrounded with, Ishikawa reluctantly shot images without much thought and was consequently "embarrassed" by the publication. From this experience, Ishikawa fully realized how much his shooting style, evidenced in his snapshots and portraits, was guided by his emotions and how he felt most connected to photographs that generated a compelling feeling within him.

Undeterred by his struggles, Ishikawa returned to the mountains alongside Hattori on multiple occasions— approximately 20 times in total between 2015 and 2021. For Ishikawa, the journey to the mountains was not explicitly for photography but rather an honest attempt to integrate the mountains as a routine aspect of his life. In 2021, Ishikawa released his second publication involving his outdoor expeditions The Inside of Life. This extension, and reimagining, of his nature photographs focused primarily on the organs and carcasses of animals he and Hattori hunted. Ishikawa's interest in the deceased bodies and organs of animals grew from simultaneous feelings of excitement, over their beauty, and disgust. Despite their gore and foul smell, Ishikawa emphasized the organs' appeal through delicate and intentional framing and juxtaposed them against stones, leaves, and plants. For Ishikawa, organs also served as a dual metaphor for both life and death, of which he was constantly reminded of while in the wilderness. Furthermore, Ishikawa saw organs a point of commonality for all animals, humans included, as their shapes more or less mirrored each others, and thus suggested that what humans kill and eat looks similar to themselves.

== Awards ==
Ishikawa has received various awards for his work including the Kimura Ihei Photo Award (2014), the Photographic Society of Japan Newcomer's Award (2015), and the 49th Okinawa Times Encouragement Award (2015). He has also been selected as a finalist for the Nissan Art Award (2017).

== Publications ==
- SHIBA 踊る惑星 (≈ SHIBA Dancing Planet). Self-published, 2010.
- しば正龍 女形の魅力 (≈ Seiryu Shiba: Allure of the Female Role Player). Self-published, 2013.
- Ryuichi Ishikawa. Self-published, 2014.
- A Grand Polyphony. Kyoto: AKAAKA Art Publishing. 2014.
- okinawan portraits 2010–2012. Kyoto: AKAAKA Art Publishing. 2014.
- adrenamix. Kyoto: AKAAKA Art Publishing. 2015.
- okinawan portraits 2012–2016. Kyoto: AKAAKA Art Publishing. 2016.
- CAMP. Ishikawa: Slant. 2016.
- The Inside of Life. Kyoto: AKAAKA Art Publishing. 2021.

== Exhibitions ==
=== Selected solo exhibitions ===
- 2010: Portrait of a Brain. Okinawa Prefectural Museum and Art Museum, Okinawa
- 2014: RYUICHI ISHIKAWA. gallery Lafayette, Okinawa
- 2014: zkop. Atsukobarouh, Tokyo
- 2014: okinawan portraits. Place M, Tokyo
- 2014: A Grand Polyphony. Ginza Nikon Salon, Tokyo; Osaka Nikon Salon, Osaka (2015)
- 2015: okinawan portraits. The Third Gallery Aya, Osaka
- 2015: A Grand Polyphony. Galerie Nord, Paris
- 2016: okinawan portraits 2012-2016. Art Gallery Artium, Fukuoka; The Third Gallery Aya, Osaka; Epson Imaging Gallery - EPSITE, Tokyo
- 2016: Once thinking, nothing before eyes. Yokohama Civic Gallery Azamino, Yokohama
- 2016: Camp. Wag Gallery, Tokyo; Have A nice gallery, Taipei; Gallery SLANT, Kanazawa (2016); PINEBROOKLYN, Osaka; tomari, Okinawa
- 2017: 草に沖に. Chiten, Kyoto
- 2017: OUTREMER / Ultramarine. Atsukobarouh, Tokyo; The Third Gallery Aya, Osaka
- 2018: zkop: a blessing in disguise. Yamamoto Keiko Rochaix, London
- 2018: home work. Chiten, Kyoto
- 2018: adrenamix. PIN-UP, Okinawa
- 2021: いのちのうちがわ. Sai Gallery, Tokyo

=== Selected group exhibitions ===
- 2012: Okinawa 0 Point: Exhibition Marking 40th Anniversary of Okinawa's Return to Japan. Heiwa-dori Street, Okinawa
- 2014: Daido Moriyama Portfolio Review Exhibition. Okinawa Prefectural Museum and Art Museum, Okinawa
- 2016: Roppongi Crossing 2016: My Body, Your Voice. Mori Art Museum, Tokyo
- 2016: Body / Play / Politics. Yokohama Art Museum, Kanagawa
- 2017: Nissan Art Award 2017: Exhibition of New Works by Five Finalists. BankART Studio NYK, Kanagawa
- 2019: Reborn-Art Festival 2019, Miyagi Prefecture
- 2019: Oh! Matsuri ☆ Goto: Showa / Heisei Heroes and People in the Japanese Contemporary Art. Hyogo Prefectural Museum of Art, Hyogo
- 2019: Artists Today. Okinawa Prefectural Museum and Art Museum, Okinawa
- 2019: Fotografia Europea 2019. Chiostri di San Pietro, Italy.
