= Yonaguni =

Westernmost island of Japan

Native name: 与那国島 Dunan
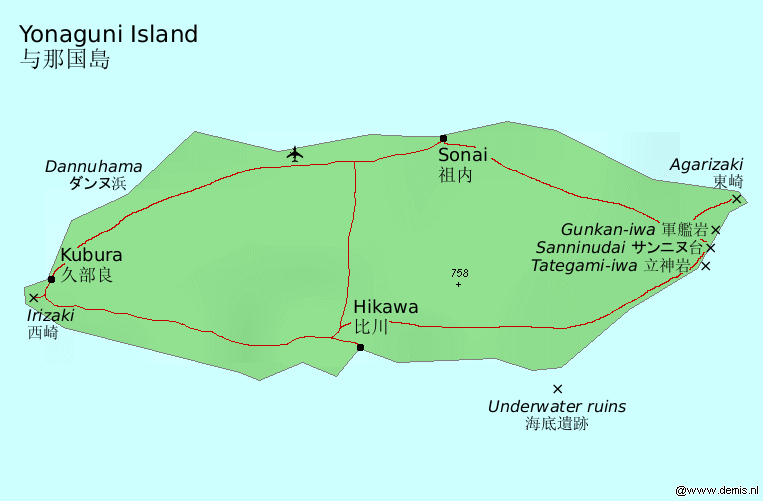
- Map of Yonaguni Island

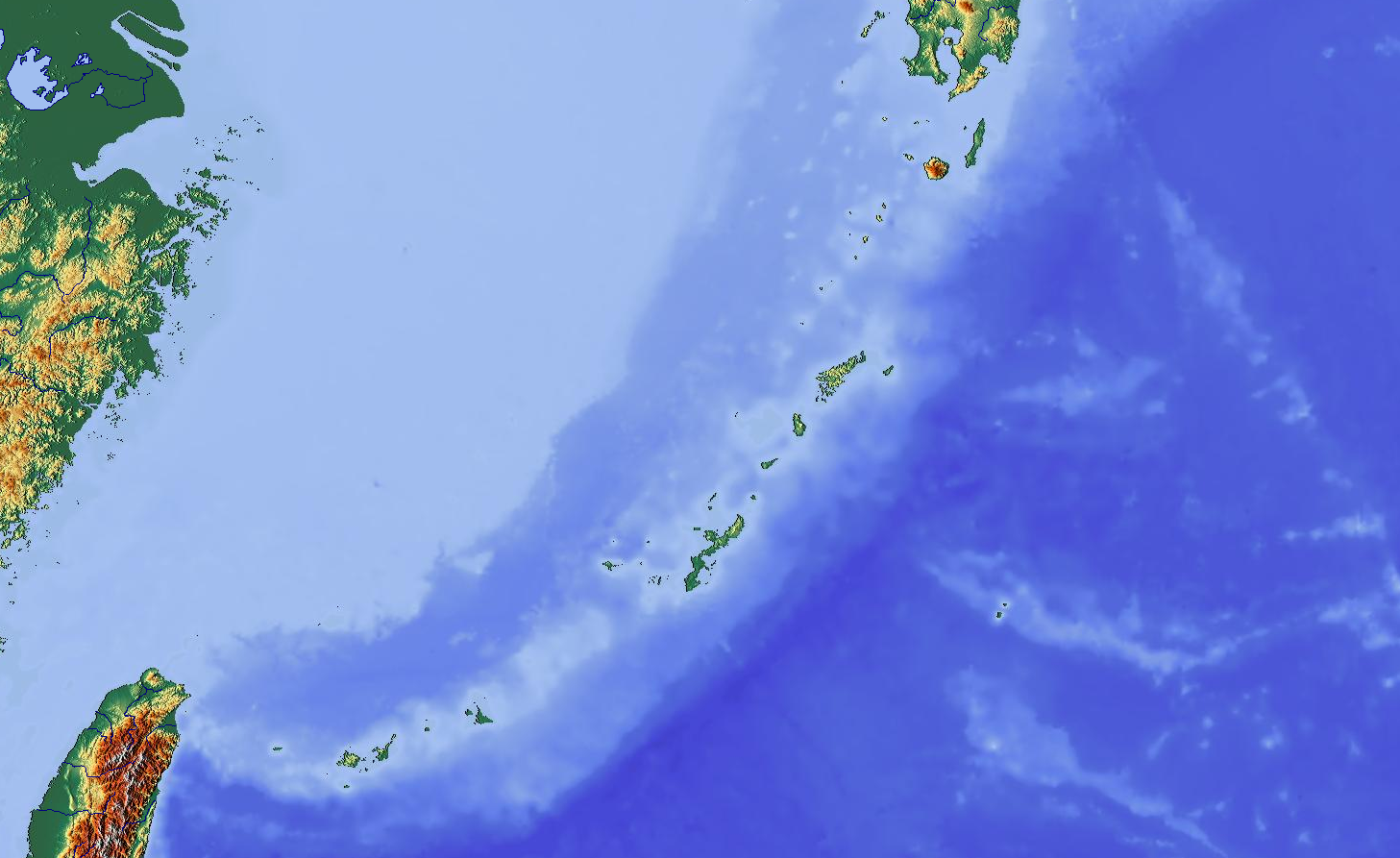
- Location within Ryukyu Islands Location within Japan

Geography
- Location: Pacific Ocean; East China Sea
- Coordinates: 24°27′20″N 122°59′20″E
- Archipelago: Yaeyama Islands
- Area: 28.88 km^{2} (11.15 sq mi)
- Highest elevation: 471 ft (143.6 m)
- Highest point: Mount Urabu

Administration
- Japan
- Region: Kyushu
- Prefecture: Okinawa Prefecture
- Town: Yonaguni, Okinawa

Demographics
- Population: 1,684 (2009)
- Pop. density: 58.2/km^{2} (150.7/sq mi)
- Ethnic groups: Ryukyuan, Japanese

Yonaguni (Japanese: 与那国島, Hepburn: Yonaguni-jima; Yonaguni: Dunan-chima, older Juni-shima; Yaeyama: Yunoon-zïma; Okinawan: Yunaguni-jima), one of the Yaeyama Islands, is the westernmost island of Japan, lying between the East China Sea and the Philippine Sea, a mere 107.4 kilometers (58.0 nmi; 66.7 mi) separate the island from Taiwan at their closest points. It is administered as the town of Yonaguni, Yaeyama Gun, Okinawa, and there are three settlements: Sonai, Kubura, and Higawa. There have been discussions to establish direct ferry services with Taiwan in order to bolster tourism.

== Name ==
The name Yonaguni is an exonym related to the native name Dunan in Yonaguni, with the regular sound change of *y- to d- and elision of the intervocalic *-g- in Yonaguni. The form yona- likely means "grain, rice", seen in other toponyms such as Yonabaru, hence possibly meaning "grain country".

== History ==
Early human migration from Taiwan to Yonaguni island has long been the subject of scholarly debate. In 2019, a team of Japanese and Taiwanese researchers succeeded in completing the two-day journey from Cape Wushibi in Taitung County to Yonaguni island along the Kuroshio current in a dugout canoe based on technology and materials from 30,000 years ago. Otherwise, the early history of Yonaguni remains vague. The first written record that ever mentions the island is a 1477 Korean document (Chosen Hyōryūmin no Yaeyama kenbunroku), an account of several fishermen from the current Jeju Province who drifted there.

A legendary female leader, Sanai Isoba, is said to have been the ruler of Yonaguni at around the end of the fifteenth century. She is described as possessing superhuman powers that allowed her to protect her people from foreign attacks multiple times, including when Yonaguni was attacked by Miyako, a nearby island. Rituals are still held once a year to worship this mythical figure.

In the 15th century, the island was brought under the control of the Ryūkyū Kingdom. In 1879, with the abolition of the Ryukyu Domain, the island was incorporated into the newly established Okinawa Prefecture of Japan.

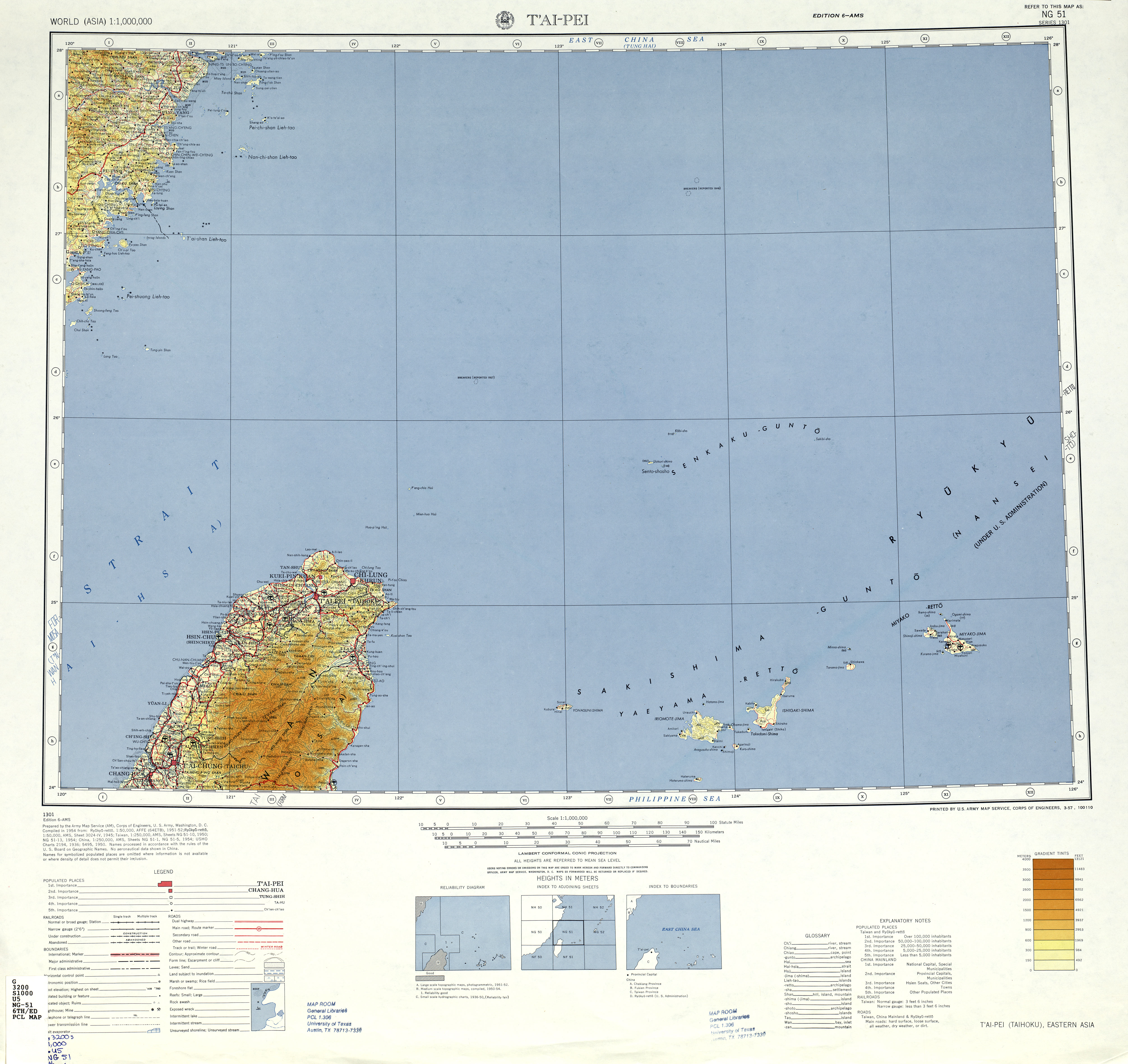
Map including Yonaguni (labeled as YONAGUNI-SHIMA) from the International Map of the World (1954)

Until the early 20th century, Yonaguni was part of the larger Yaeyama Magiri (a regional administrative unit), which included the neighboring Yaeyama Islands and became Yaeyama village in 1908. In 1948, it became an independent village. From 1945 to 1972, it was occupied by the United States and was then returned to Japan to form a part of Okinawa Prefecture.

As a result of increased tensions between Japan, China, and Taiwan over the disputed sovereignty of the Japanese-controlled uninhabited Senkaku/Diaoyu/Tiaoyutai Islands which are located roughly 80 nautical miles north-northeast of Yonaguni Island, Japan began construction in 2014 of a coastal monitoring / early warning station with radar and other sensors on Yonaguni to counter a perceived threat from Chinese forces. The initial planned complement of 150 troops include personnel stationed at a garrison located on the outskirts of Yonaguni town. The station's radar became active on 28 March 2016. Separately, a joint (GSDF / ASDF) "mobile aircraft control & warning squadron" is planned to be formed and co-located at the station.

In 2024, the Japanese army deployed seven surface-to-surface missile companies, covering Miyako, Ishigaki, and Amami Ōshima. Additionally, an electronic warfare unit was deployed from Kumamoto Prefecture to Yonaguni "to jam or interfere with hostile forces' signals and radar stations". The deployment caused local residents concern of heightened military tensions. In February 2026, Japan announced that it intended to deploy surface-to-air missiles to the island by 2031.

Given Yonaguni's geographic proximity to Taiwan (only 107.4 km east of Yilan), there have been discussions to develop tourism in Yonaguni via a regular, direct ferry service from Taiwan's Yilan County (Suao Township) for both Taiwanese and Japanese tourists. In July 2023, Taiwan's Legislative Speaker, You Si-kun, led a trial ferry service from Suao to Yonaguni. The trip took around two hours each way. It was said that if a regular ferry service was established, it would attract Taiwanese tourists to Yonaguni Island, which has a population of just 1,700, and Japanese visitors to Yilan. It was expressed that the friendship between Japan and Taiwan can also be deepened through such ties. However, due to Yonaguni's lack of infrastructure and tourism resources (such as hotels, restaurants, and transportation), challenges remain to promote tourism.

== Mythical and cultural references ==
As the westernmost island of Japan, Yonaguni has also been constantly associated with the myth of the island of women (Nyōgo no Shima) since the Edo period. As suggested by the name, the island of women is an island where there are only women born and living to support each other. Being a trope frequently used in Edo literary works, it not only appears at the end of The Life of an Amorous Man (好色一代男 Kōshoku Ichidai Otoko, 1682), but also dominates the second part of the five-section Strange Tales of the Crescent Moon (椿説弓張月 Chinsetsu Yumiharizuki, 1807–1811). While the whole second part of the story is about the protagonist Tametomo's time spent on the island of women, which is the westernmost island of Japan according to the tale, the map provided at the beginning of the third section clearly marks the island as 'Yonaguni', assuming the association between the mythical women island and Yonaguni.

During the Taisho period, the Yaeyama islands including Yonaguni gradually came to be explored by people traveling from Japan, as there were ships from Osaka to Yonaguni once a year that introduced outsiders to the islands, who brought their knowledge about Yonaguni back to Japan through many ways, such as writing.

Out of all these early records about Yonaguni, one of the earliest and most influential writings was An expedition to the Southern Islands (Nantō tanken) by Sasamori Gisuke. In Sasamori's research of Yonaguni, the island was notable due to its women: "Women on the island have white skin, and are attentive and thoughtful. It takes only a few pennies for someone who enjoys accompaniment of beautiful women to have one of them in attendance during his stay provide drinks and serve him all night." The statement was confirmed by a later published collection of essays. A folk culture scholar, Motoyama Keisen, asserts that "Yonaguni is the island of women", and continues to quote and agree with Sasamori's account of Yonaguni women, saying that "Surely this was true in 1893, when the author went on his expedition there."

However, a counter-statement is found in a collection of some comical essays by a Taishō novelist and script writer, Murakami Namiroku, in his Collection of Satire Essays (Hiniku Bunshu), and gives a more detailed view of the circumstances of Yonaguni women. One of the essays is titled "Yonaguni" and focuses on the same topic, claiming that "once a man steps on the island, no matter how strong he is, the man would be attacked by women coming from all directions, and hardly ever there could be men who could safely withdraw from there". Furthermore, he describes Yonaguni as an island where, although there are almost only women, for reproductive purposes, there are also a few men: as many as around one-tenth of the women. Curiously, there are only female newborns. Serving as reproductive tools for the women, men are rarely able to live long. Murakami expresses his worries as well at the end, as the women here are all naturally beautiful and potentially they would attract those driven by sexual desire to explore "the hidden paradise".

Nevertheless, these introductory essays aiming to bring an exotic taste are less specific than a quite comprehensive travel log by Yanagita Kunio, who was inspired by Sasamori's work and finally did his own research, An Account of the South Sea (Kainan shōki), published in 1925. A long essay from the collection is titled and devoted to "Yonaguni Women". He provides a detailed written record of their customs and daily life, and writes about how they are busy farming, cooking, and taking care of children, with two photographs attached, wearing clothes not so much different from the rest of Japan.

Yonaguni islanders traditionally believed that their island had once been ruled by a goddess named Miruku, who brought fertility to the land. She was ousted by a god named Saku after a flower-growing contest for control over the island, in which Saku stole her flower while she slept. Miruku vanished, and the island's primeval prosperity sank into poverty once she left. The islanders thus held rituals in honor of the goddess in the hope that she might one day return. As late as the 1980s, the highlight of the Yonaguni harvest festival was a procession involving a person in a Miruku mask reenacting the goddess. A nearly identical myth is widespread in Korea.

== Geography ==
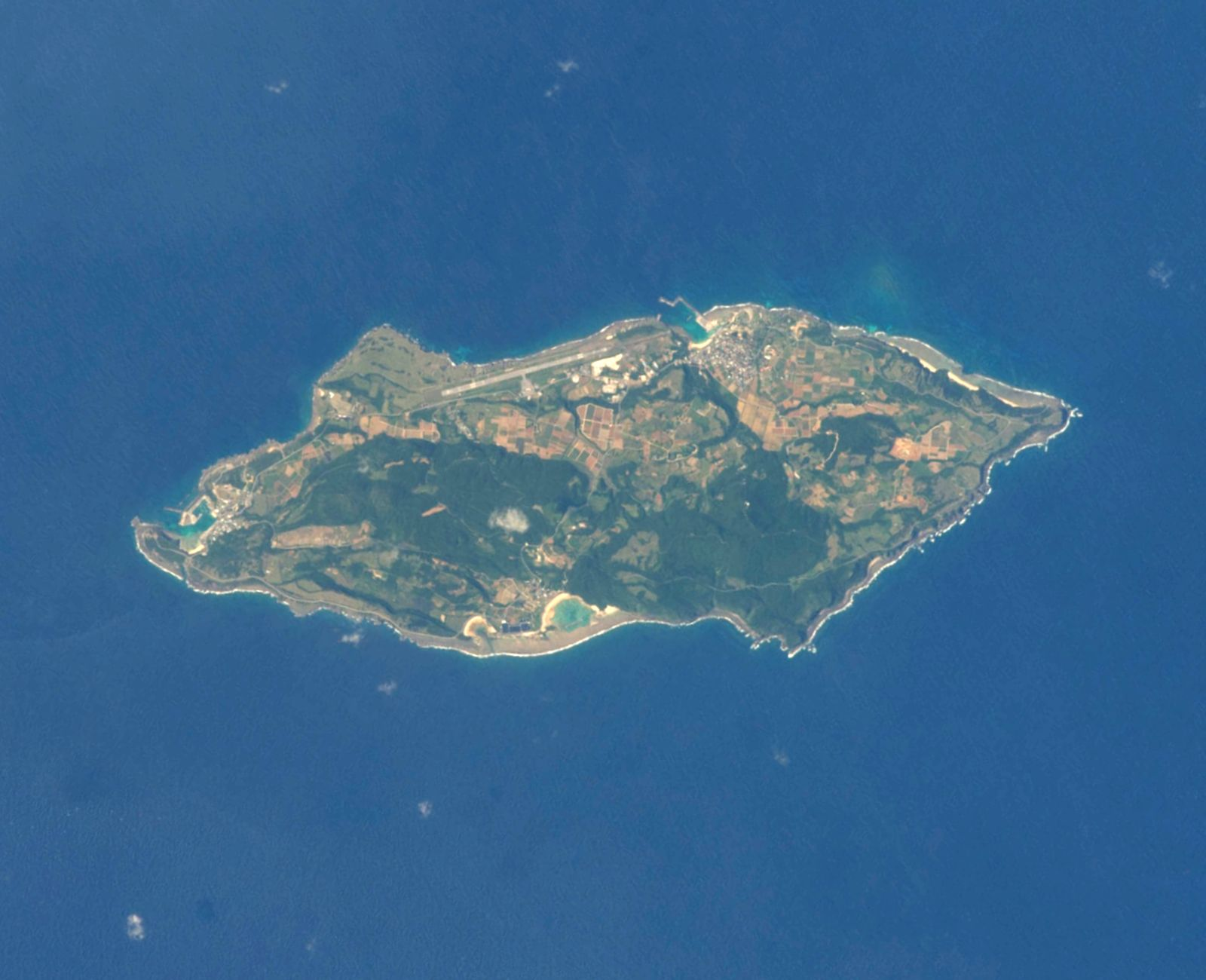
Yonaguni from space, April 2014

The island has an area of 28.88 km^{2} (11.15 sq mi) and a population of around 1,700.

Tuishi (Japanese: トゥイシ), off Cape Irizaki at the western tip of the island, is the westernmost point of Japan. The island is situated in the middle of the Yonaguni Depression, a relatively deep gap in the Ryukyu arc, where the warm Kuroshio Current enters the East China Sea from the Philippine Sea. The island has one stream designated as Class 2, the Tabaru River.

According to Japanese anthropologist Yousuke Kaifu, the island of Yonaguni can be seen with the naked eye from Taroko Mountain in Taiwan under good weather conditions.

== Climate ==
Yonaguni has a tropical rainforest climate (Köppen climate classification Af). The average yearly temperature is 23.8 °C (74.8 °F), and the average monthly temperature ranges from 18.4 °C (65.1 °F) in January to 28.8 °C (83.8 °F) in July. September is the wettest month while July is the driest.

Climate data for Yonaguni, 1991–2020 normals, extremes 1956–present
Month	Jan	Feb	Mar	Apr	May	Jun	Jul	Aug	Sep	Oct	Nov	Dec	Year
Record high °C (°F)	27.5 (81.5)	27.7 (81.9)	29.0 (84.2)	31.3 (88.3)	33.1 (91.6)	34.2 (93.6)	35.5 (95.9)	34.6 (94.3)	34.6 (94.3)	33.9 (93.0)	30.2 (86.4)	28.0 (82.4)	35.5 (95.9)
Mean maximum °C (°F)	25.1 (77.2)	26.1 (79.0)	27.4 (81.3)	29.2 (84.6)	30.8 (87.4)	32.2 (90.0)	33.3 (91.9)	33.1 (91.6)	32.1 (89.8)	30.5 (86.9)	28.5 (83.3)	26.4 (79.5)	34.0 (93.2)
Mean daily maximum °C (°F)	20.7 (69.3)	21.3 (70.3)	23.0 (73.4)	25.5 (77.9)	28.0 (82.4)	30.3 (86.5)	31.7 (89.1)	31.4 (88.5)	30.0 (86.0)	27.8 (82.0)	25.3 (77.5)	22.2 (72.0)	26.4 (79.6)
Daily mean °C (°F)	18.5 (65.3)	19.0 (66.2)	20.5 (68.9)	23.0 (73.4)	25.4 (77.7)	27.9 (82.2)	28.9 (84.0)	28.7 (83.7)	27.5 (81.5)	25.4 (77.7)	23.1 (73.6)	20.1 (68.2)	24.0 (75.2)
Mean daily minimum °C (°F)	16.6 (61.9)	17.0 (62.6)	18.3 (64.9)	20.9 (69.6)	23.4 (74.1)	26.0 (78.8)	26.8 (80.2)	26.4 (79.5)	25.3 (77.5)	23.6 (74.5)	21.3 (70.3)	18.2 (64.8)	22.0 (71.6)
Mean minimum °C (°F)	11.9 (53.4)	12.7 (54.9)	13.8 (56.8)	16.1 (61.0)	19.6 (67.3)	22.5 (72.5)	24.5 (76.1)	24.4 (75.9)	22.7 (72.9)	20.5 (68.9)	17.3 (63.1)	13.4 (56.1)	11.0 (51.8)
Record low °C (°F)	7.7 (45.9)	8.4 (47.1)	9.0 (48.2)	12.1 (53.8)	15.0 (59.0)	17.6 (63.7)	21.9 (71.4)	21.7 (71.1)	18.2 (64.8)	16.2 (61.2)	11.4 (52.5)	9.1 (48.4)	7.7 (45.9)
Average precipitation mm (inches)	187.2 (7.37)	163.6 (6.44)	163.7 (6.44)	153.0 (6.02)	207.3 (8.16)	162.3 (6.39)	125.3 (4.93)	213.0 (8.39)	285.7 (11.25)	238.5 (9.39)	222.6 (8.76)	200.8 (7.91)	2,323 (91.45)
Average rainy days	15.8	13.6	13.4	11.1	11.3	9.3	8.4	10.4	11.7	10.8	13.6	15.7	145.1
Average relative humidity (%)	75	76	77	79	81	83	80	81	79	75	76	74	78
Mean monthly sunshine hours	52.8	60.3	88.1	104.7	142.3	182.3	257.9	227.4	180.9	132.2	86.0	59.0	1,573.9
Source: Japan Meteorological Agency (1991-2020)

== Main sights ==
Yonaguni is known in Japan for the hanazake, a 120-proof rice-based distilled beverage (awamori) produced only on the island.

The island is also the only natural habitat of a distinctive horse breed, the Yonaguni horse.

Yonaguni's densely forested areas provide a suitable habitat for the Ryukyu atlas moth (A. a. ryukyuensis).

Yonaguni is a destination for divers because of the large numbers of hammerhead sharks that gather in the surrounding waters during winter.

=== Yonaguni Monument ===
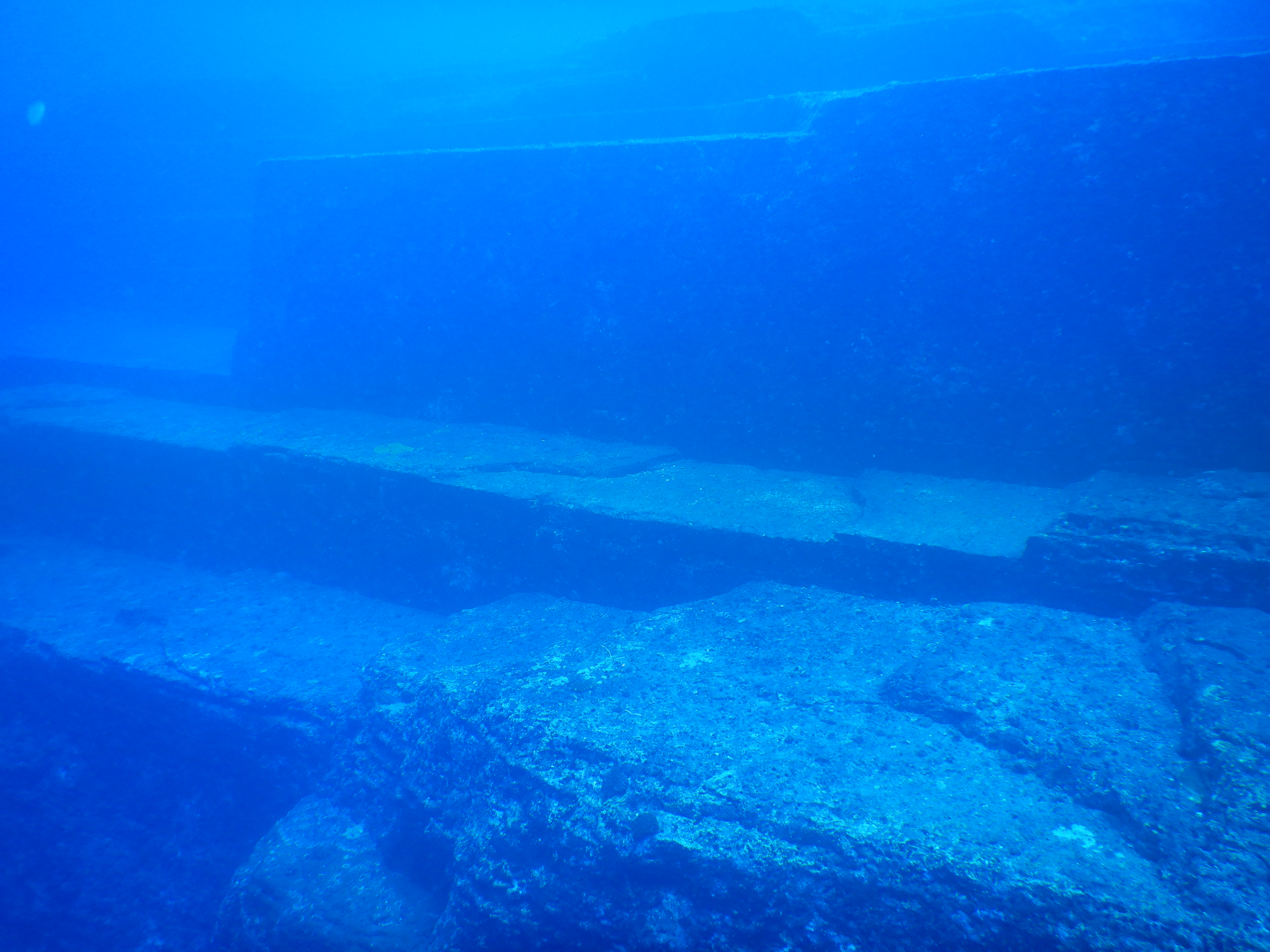
Yonaguni Monument, underwater rock formations

In 1986, local divers discovered a striking underwater rock formation off the southernmost point of the island. The formation, known popularly as the Yonaguni Monument, has staircase-like terraces with flat sides and sharp corners. Masaaki Kimura, a professor from Okinawa, believes it is an artificial (or artificially modified) structure; however, the majority of academic society regard the rock formation as a natural geologic structure.

=== Irizaki ===
Cape Irizaki is the place to see the final sunset in Japan.

=== Agarizaki ===
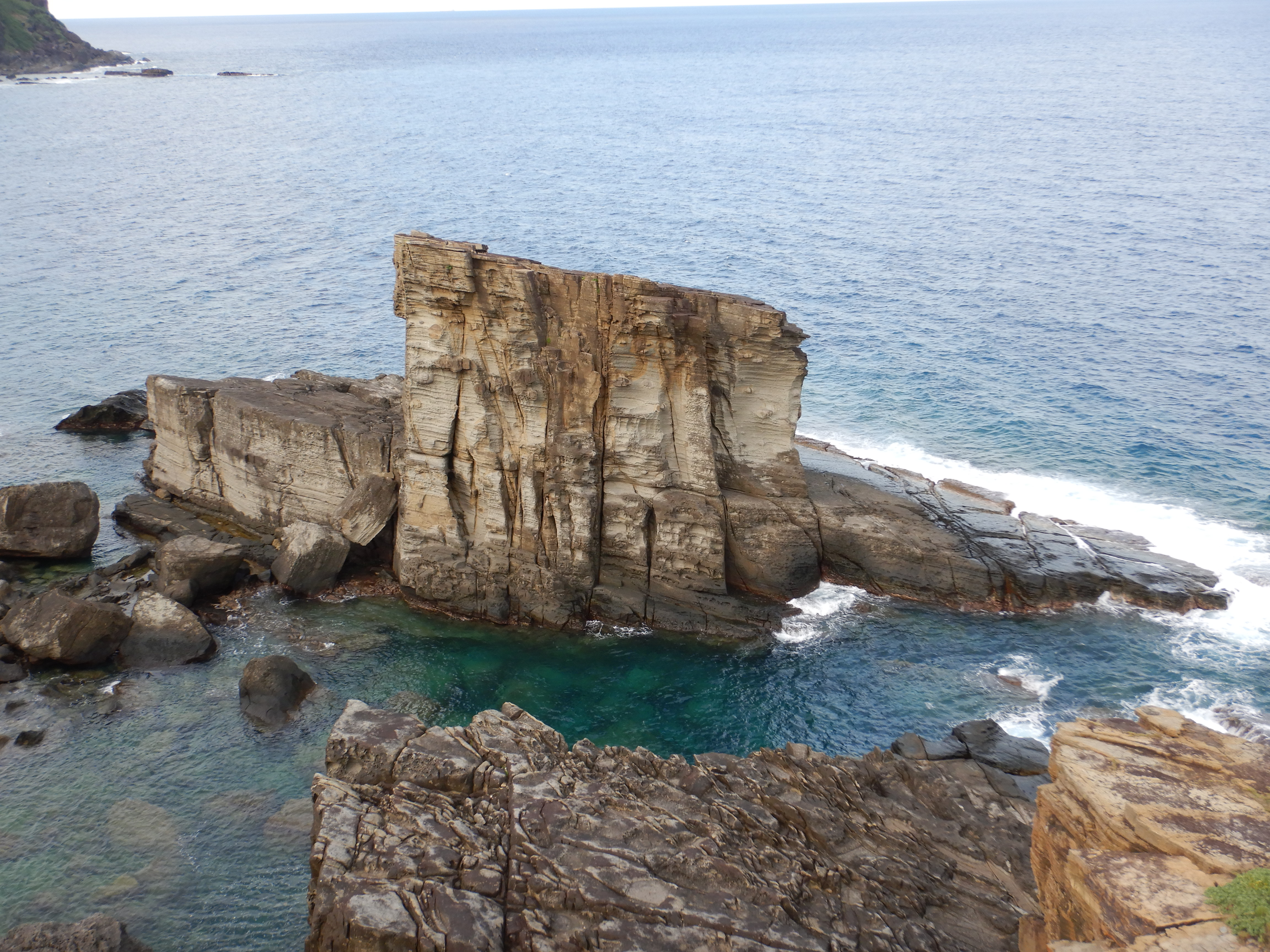
Warship rock (Gunkan-iwa)

Cape Agarizaki is the easternmost cape of Yonaguni. Tourists come here to view the sunrise and to observe scenic views of the ocean at the 100-meter-high (328 ft) cape. Other attractions include the lighthouse and Yonaguni horse.

=== Southeast coast ===
- Gunkan-iwa is a rock formation near the shore that looks like a battleship
- Tachigami-iwa (Tatigami-iwa) is a single big rock outstanding offshore
- Sanninudai is a place with step-like slate rock terraces, and offers a viewing point for Gunkan-iwa
- Jinmen-iwa is a big rock in the forest that resembles a human face

== Transportation ==
Yonaguni Airport serves Yonaguni island.

== See also ==
- Geography of Japan
- Japanese archipelago
- Extreme points of Japan
- Yonaguni language
- Okinawa
