= Yonaguni, Okinawa =

Yonaguni 与那国町 Dunan
- Town
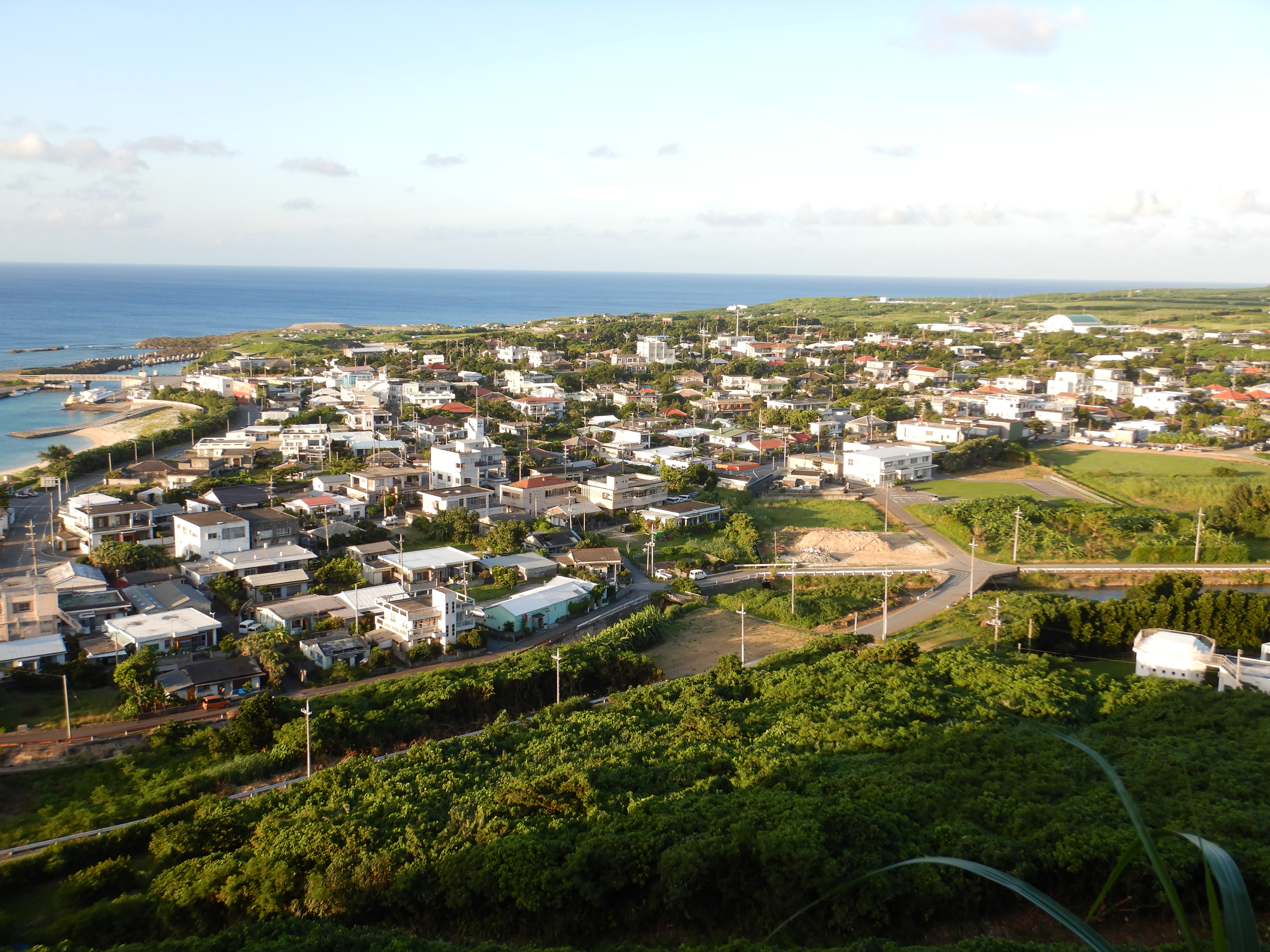
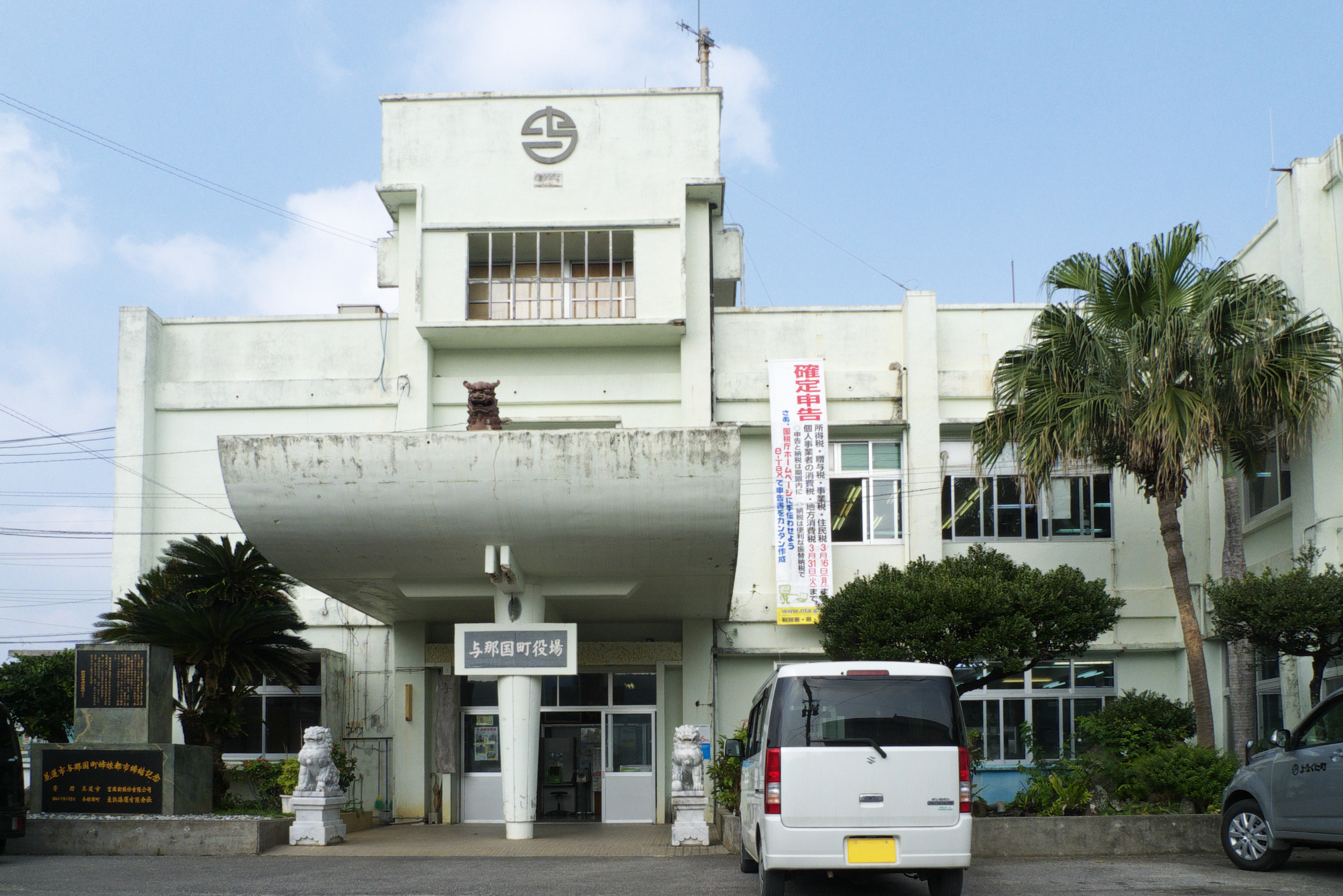
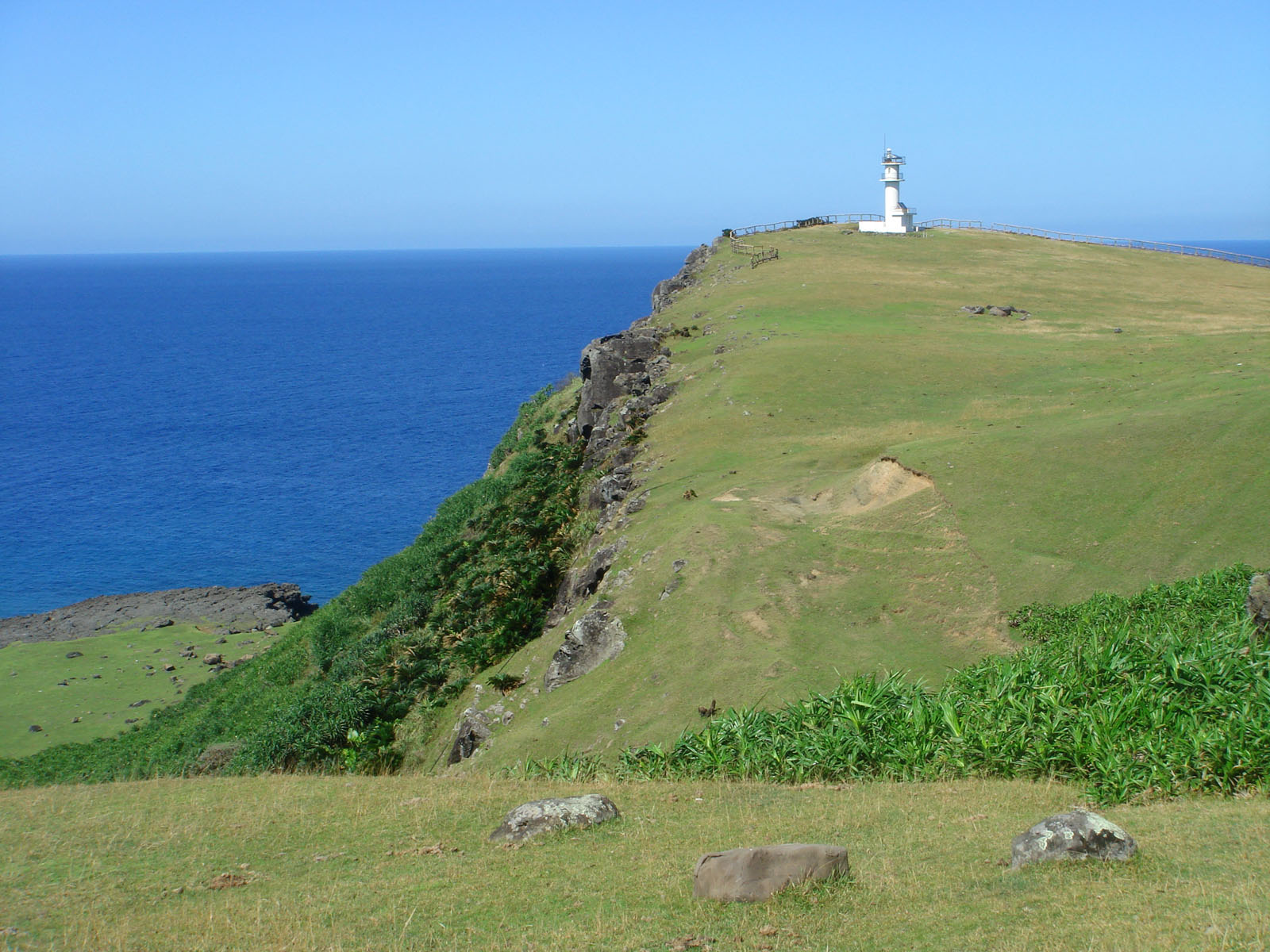
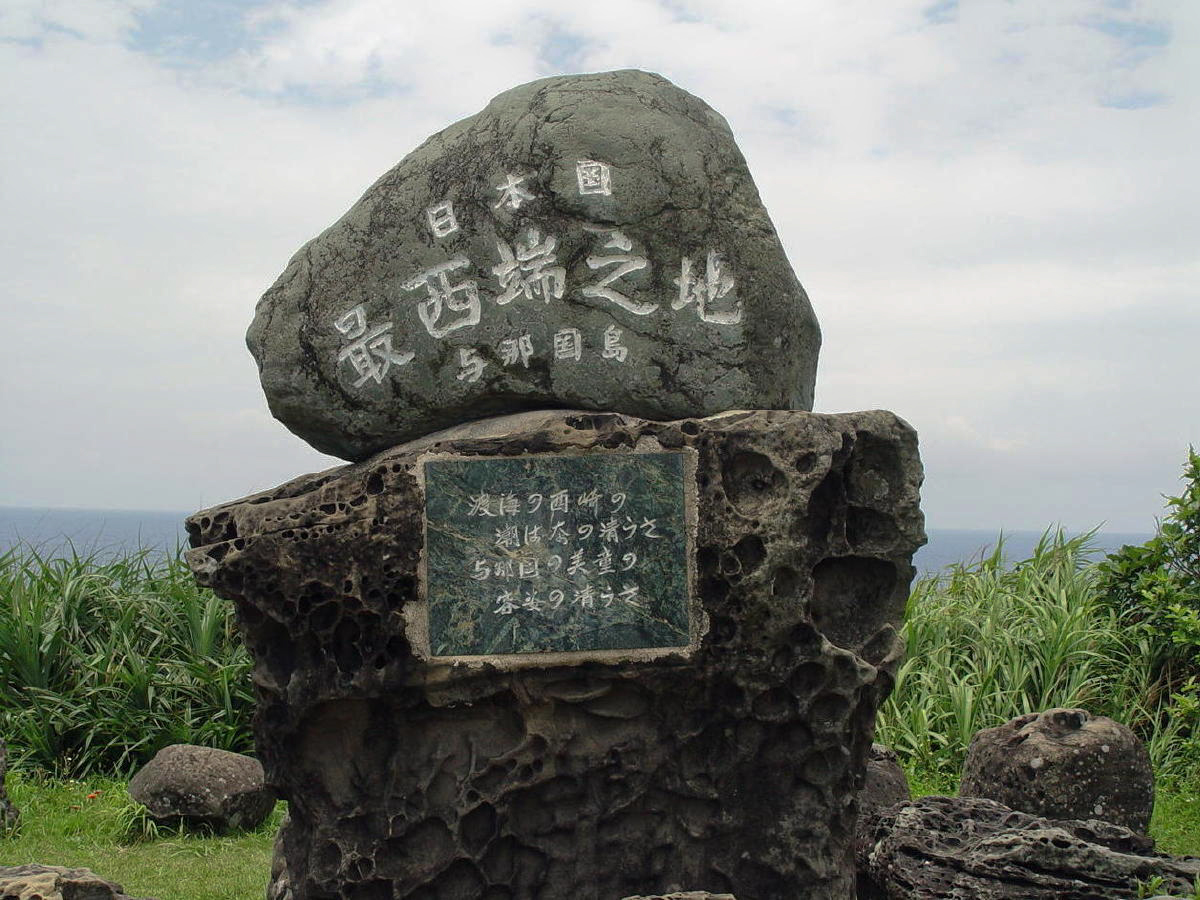
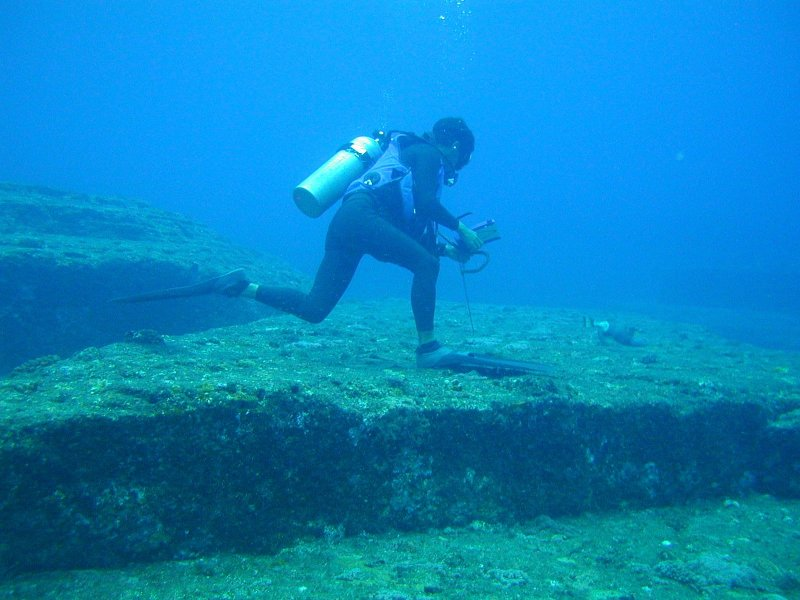
- Sonai Village Yonaguni Town Hall Agarizaki Lighthouse Monument to the westernmost point of Japan Scuba diving near the Yonaguni Monument

- Flag Seal

- Location of Yonaguni in Okinawa Prefecture

- Location in Japan
- Coordinates: 24°28′5″N 123°0′17″E
- Country: Japan
- Region: Kyushu
- Prefecture: Okinawa Prefecture
- District: Yaeyama

Government
  - Mayor: Shukichi Hokama

Area
  - Total: 28.95 km^{2} (11.18 sq mi)

Population (October 1, 2016)
  - Total: 2,048
  - Density: 58.2/km^{2} (151/sq mi)
- Time zone: UTC+09:00 (JST)
- City hall address: 129 Aza-Yonaguni, Yonaguni-chō, Yaeyama-gun, Okinawa-ken; 907–1801
- Climate: Af
- Website: www.town.yonaguni.okinawa.jp
- Symbols
- Bird: Japanese white-eye (Zosterops japonicus)
- Butterfly: Atlas moth (Attacus atlas)
- Flower: Lily (Lilium)
- Tree: Chinese fan palm (Livistona chinensis)

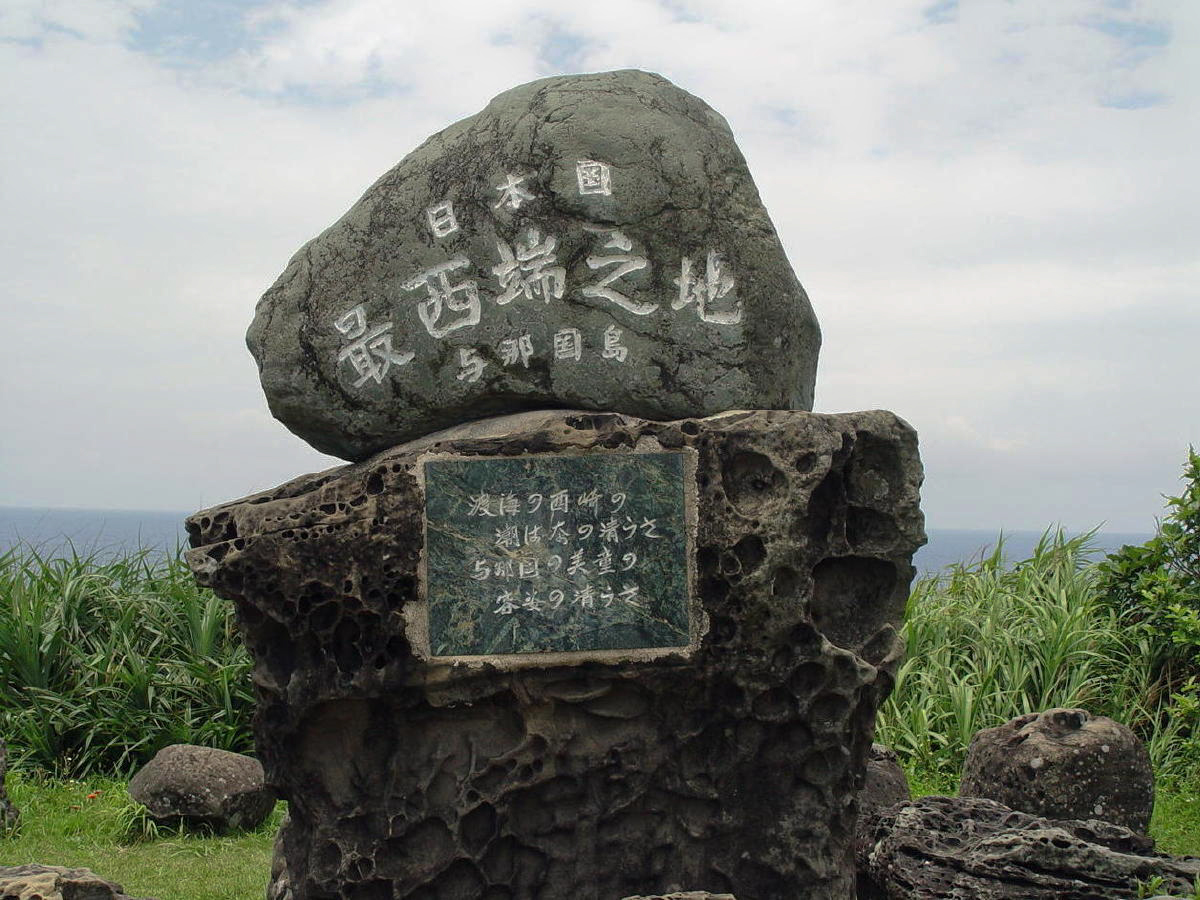
Japan's Westernmost Point Monument

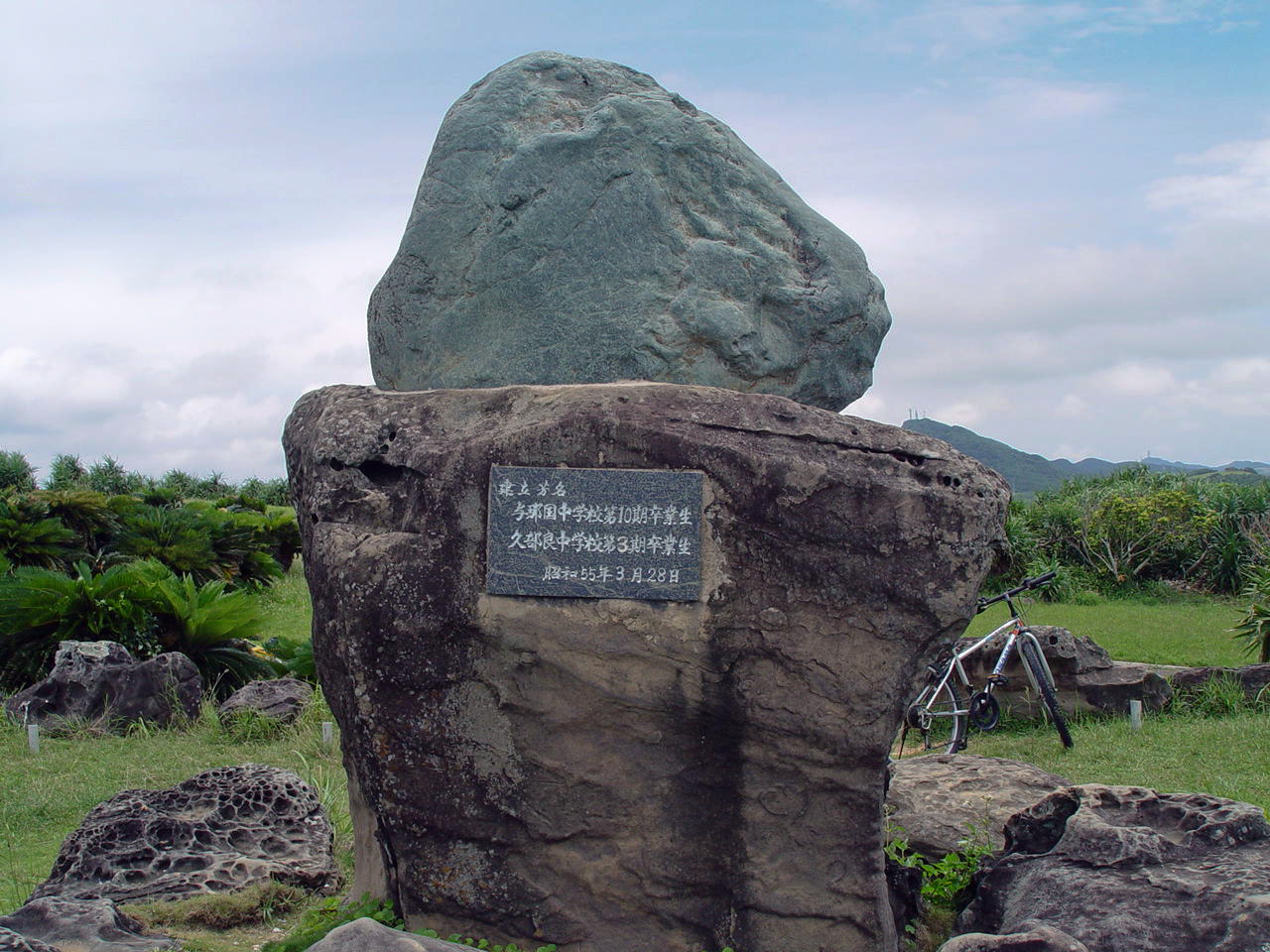
Reverse side of Japan's Westernmost Point Monument

Yonaguni (Japanese: 与那国町, Hepburn: Yonaguni-chō; Yonaguni: ドゥナン, romanized: Dunan, older ジュニ, Juni; Yaeyama: ユノーン, romanized: Yunōn; Okinawan: ユナグニ, romanized: Yunaguni) is a town located entirely on Yonaguni Island in Yaeyama District, Okinawa Prefecture, Japan. It is the westernmost municipality in Japan, and is known for billfish fishing and as a diving spot. In 1987, divers discovered the Yonaguni Monument, a rock formation that some believe may be man-made.

It is also home to two Ryūkyūan writing systems, pictographic "kaida-di" (also used on Ishigaki and Taketomi islands where it is called "kaida-ji") and the symbols used to indicate family names, "dāhan" (also used on Ishigaki Island where they are called "yāban").

== History ==
Presently, the oldest confirmed ruins are the ruins in Tuguru Beach. Due to the southern style stone tools found, it is thought that a culture influenced by Southeast Asia existed here at one time.

After this point, the history of the island of Yonaguni is unclear, but in the Gusuku Era, settlements were formed on the top of the plateau. The Shima Nakamura Ruins are one example, and it is known for being the birth village of the famous woman chief, San’ai Isoba.

From the time of the Ryūkyū Kingdom, Yonaguni prospered as a commerce center with Taiwan. Due to World War II, until it was placed under control of the United States Civil Administration of the Ryukyu Islands, the number of people involved in smuggling surged in the area. The population in 1947 had reached 12,000, but although Yonaguni became incorporated as a town, a crackdown on smuggling led to a sharp decrease in the population.

Ishigaki and the surrounding towns and cities are discussing a merger, with the exception of Yonaguni which abstained, cutting the members of parliament from 12 in half, down to 6.

- 1522: Yonaguni was Invaded by the Ryūkyū army and became a territory of the Ryūkyū Kingdom.
- 1872: The Ryūkyū Kingdom is abolished; in its place, the Ryūkyū Domain is established and the island becomes a territory of the Ryūkyū Domain.
- 1879: The Ryūkyū Domain is abolished and becomes Okinawa-ken.
- 1908: The island municipal system abolishes the magiri system, and the Ishigaki-magiri, Ōhama-magiri, and Miyara-magiri join the island of Yonaguni to become Yaeyama-son.
- 1914: Through a division of Yaeyama-son, the village of Yonaguni-son is formed.
- 1948: Yonaguni-chō is incorporated as a town.

== Geography ==
- Yonaguni is the westernmost locality of Japan and is the midpoint between Ishigaki and Taiwan. At Cape Irizaki (Yonagunian language: Irinzati) on the western edge of the island, there is a monument inscribed with the words: "The westernmost point in Japan."
- The island is not part of Japan's air defense identification zone or flight information region; instead, it sits in Taiwan's Air Defense Identification Zone and flight information region. (Please refer to the article on Yonaguni Airport for more details.)
- The distance between Tuishi (Japanese: トゥイシ) — a rocky formation about 120 m northwest of Cape Irizaki that forms part of the town's territory — and Wuyanjiao (Chinese: 烏岩角) in Su'ao Township, Yilan County, Taiwan is 107.3 km (66.7 mi) and therefore closer than Ishigaki, which is 118 km (73 mi) away. For further comparison, Yonaguni is much closer to Taipei (the capital of Taiwan) at approximately 160 km (99 mi) than its own capital (Tokyo), which is about 2,000 km (1,243 mi) away. Due to this, it is attempting to establish closer relations with Taiwan, including attempting to set up easier access to and from cities in Taiwan, with irregular service to Hualien already established. Further cooperation has been opposed by the central government, thus the lack of further progress.

=== Rivers ===
- Tahara River (Okinawa)

=== Population ===
Historical population
Year	Pop.	±%
1980	2,119	—
1985	2,054	−3.1%
1990	1,833	−10.8%
1995	1,801	−1.7%
2000	1,852	+2.8%
2005	1,796	−3.0%
2005 Census, Ministry of Internal Affairs and Communications – Statistics Department

Comparison of Population Distribution between Yonaguni and Japanese National Average
Population Distribution by Age and Sex in Yonaguni
■ Yonaguni
■ Japan (average)
■ Male
■ Female

1970	2,913
1975	2,155
1980	2,119
1985	2,054
1990	1,833
1995	1,801
2000	1,852
2005	1,796
2010	1,657

2015 Census, Ministry of Internal Affairs and Communications - Statistics Department

=== Climate ===
Climate data for Yonaguni, 1991–2020 normals, extremes 1956–present
Month	Jan	Feb	Mar	Apr	May	Jun	Jul	Aug	Sep	Oct	Nov	Dec	Year
Record high °C (°F)	27.5 (81.5)	27.7 (81.9)	29.0 (84.2)	31.3 (88.3)	33.1 (91.6)	34.2 (93.6)	35.5 (95.9)	34.6 (94.3)	34.6 (94.3)	33.9 (93.0)	30.2 (86.4)	28.0 (82.4)	35.5 (95.9)
Mean maximum °C (°F)	25.1 (77.2)	26.1 (79.0)	27.4 (81.3)	29.2 (84.6)	30.8 (87.4)	32.2 (90.0)	33.3 (91.9)	33.1 (91.6)	32.1 (89.8)	30.5 (86.9)	28.5 (83.3)	26.4 (79.5)	34.0 (93.2)
Mean daily maximum °C (°F)	20.7 (69.3)	21.3 (70.3)	23.0 (73.4)	25.5 (77.9)	28.0 (82.4)	30.3 (86.5)	31.7 (89.1)	31.4 (88.5)	30.0 (86.0)	27.8 (82.0)	25.3 (77.5)	22.2 (72.0)	26.4 (79.6)
Daily mean °C (°F)	18.5 (65.3)	19.0 (66.2)	20.5 (68.9)	23.0 (73.4)	25.4 (77.7)	27.9 (82.2)	28.9 (84.0)	28.7 (83.7)	27.5 (81.5)	25.4 (77.7)	23.1 (73.6)	20.1 (68.2)	24.0 (75.2)
Mean daily minimum °C (°F)	16.6 (61.9)	17.0 (62.6)	18.3 (64.9)	20.9 (69.6)	23.4 (74.1)	26.0 (78.8)	26.8 (80.2)	26.4 (79.5)	25.3 (77.5)	23.6 (74.5)	21.3 (70.3)	18.2 (64.8)	22.0 (71.6)
Mean minimum °C (°F)	11.9 (53.4)	12.7 (54.9)	13.8 (56.8)	16.1 (61.0)	19.6 (67.3)	22.5 (72.5)	24.5 (76.1)	24.4 (75.9)	22.7 (72.9)	20.5 (68.9)	17.3 (63.1)	13.4 (56.1)	11.0 (51.8)
Record low °C (°F)	7.7 (45.9)	8.4 (47.1)	9.0 (48.2)	12.1 (53.8)	15.0 (59.0)	17.6 (63.7)	21.9 (71.4)	21.7 (71.1)	18.2 (64.8)	16.2 (61.2)	11.4 (52.5)	9.1 (48.4)	7.7 (45.9)
Average precipitation mm (inches)	187.2 (7.37)	163.6 (6.44)	163.7 (6.44)	153.0 (6.02)	207.3 (8.16)	162.3 (6.39)	125.3 (4.93)	213.0 (8.39)	285.7 (11.25)	238.5 (9.39)	222.6 (8.76)	200.8 (7.91)	2,323 (91.45)
Average rainy days	15.8	13.6	13.4	11.1	11.3	9.3	8.4	10.4	11.7	10.8	13.6	15.7	145.1
Average relative humidity (%)	75	76	77	79	81	83	80	81	79	75	76	74	78
Mean monthly sunshine hours	52.8	60.3	88.1	104.7	142.3	182.3	257.9	227.4	180.9	132.2	86.0	59.0	1,573.9
Source: Japan Meteorological Agency (1991-2020)

== Administration ==
- Mayor Ken'ichi Itokazu

== Transportation ==
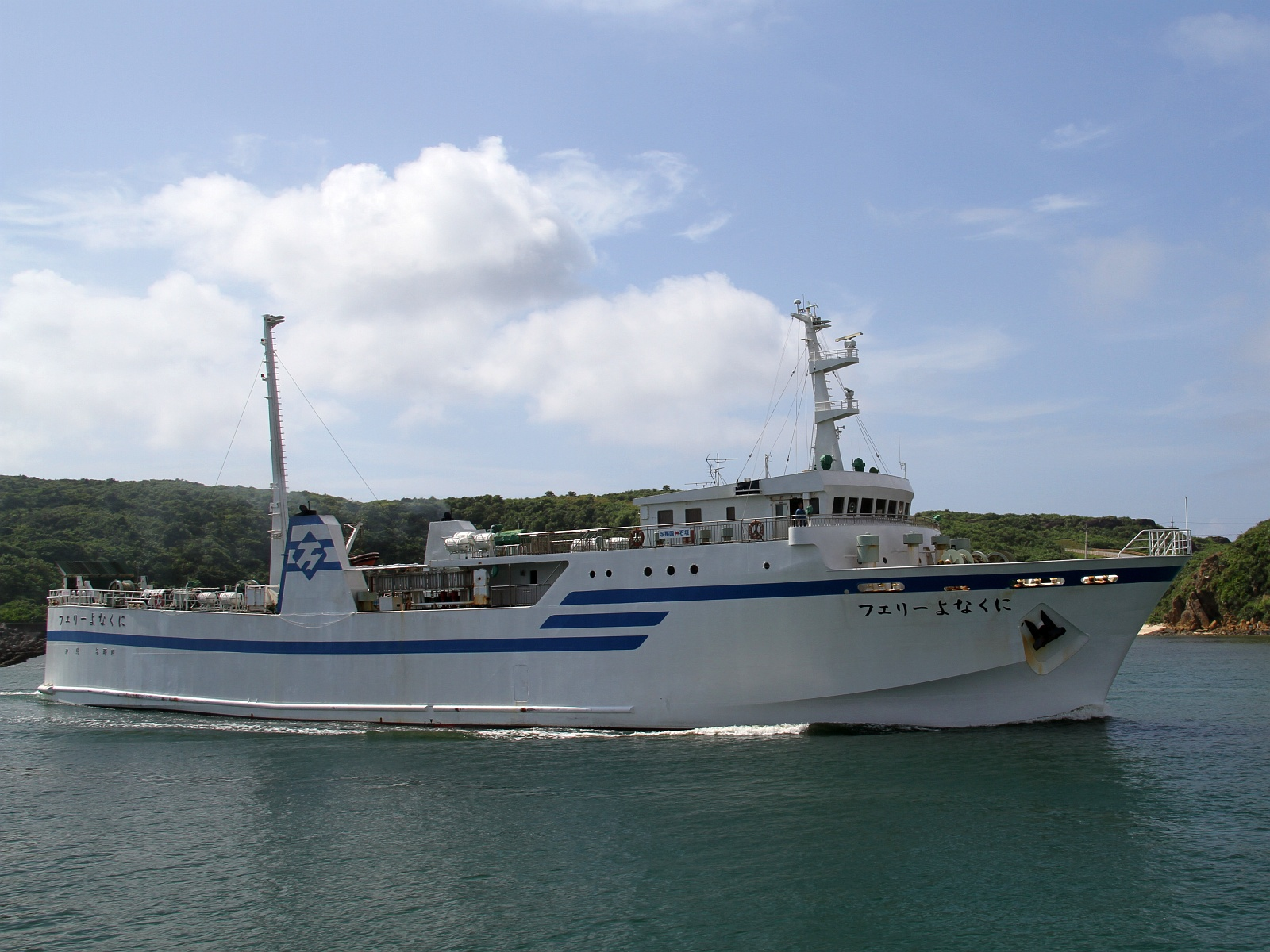
Ferry Yonakuni

=== Airport ===
Yonaguni Airport

- Japan Transocean Air (JTA) – JAL group
  - Ishigaki Airport 30 min., one round trip flight daily (Boeing 737–400)
- Ryūkyū Air Commuter (RAC) – JAL and JTA groups
  - Naha Airport 80 min., four round trip flights per week (Bombardier Dash 8 DHC-8-100)
  - Ishigaki Airport 30 min., four round trip flights per week (Bombardier Dash 8 DHC-8-100)

=== Harbours ===
Kubura Harbour

- Fukuyama Maritime "Ferry Yonakuni"
  - Ishigaki Harbour 4 hr. 30 min. (only two round trips per week)
  - Naha Harbour (irregular schedule)

Sonai Harbour

=== Roads ===
- Okinawa Prefectural Road 216 – Yonaguni Island Route
- Okinawa Prefectural Road 217 – Yonaguni Harbor Route

(Rental cars are available)

=== Bus ===
- Yonaguni Transit

== Region ==
=== Education ===
- Hikawa Elementary School
- Kubura Elementary School
- Kubura Junior High School – Japan's westernmost school
- Yonaguni Elementary School
- Yonaguni Junior High School

Because there are no high schools on the island, students entering high school must attend on the Okinawa mainland or on the island of Ishigaki, and 100% of junior-high schoolers continue on to high school.

== Famous places and historic sites ==
- Agaisati (東崎, Eastern Cape)
- Irisati (西崎, Western Cape)
- Tatigan (立神岩, Standing God Rock)
- Gunkan icibugu (軍艦岩, Battleship Rock)
- The open set of the TV drama series, Dr. Kotō's Clinic
- tuyama ugan (十山拝所, Ten Mountain Shrine) – Japan's westernmost Shinto shrine

=== Cultural and natural assets ===
Yonaguni Town hosts eighteen designated or registered tangible cultural properties and monuments, at the national, prefectural or municipal level.

- Name (Japanese) (Type of registration)

==== Cultural Properties ====
- Irifukuhama Family Residence (main house) (入福浜家住宅 主屋) (National)
- Kubura Family Residence (main house, stone wall) (久部良家住宅 主屋、石垣) (National)
- Tōgei Family Residence (main house, stone wall, well, stone water tank, water tank) (東迎家住宅 主屋、石垣、井戸、イチタライ、水タンク) (National)

==== Places of scenic beauty ====
- Kubura-bari and Kubura-furishi Sceneries (久部良バリ及び久部良フリシ) (National)
- Kubura-barii area (久部良バリ一帯) (Prefectural)
- Sanninudai Scenery (サンニヌ台) (National) (Prefectural)
- Tindabana Scenery (ティンダバナ) (National)

==== Natural Monuments ====
- Atlas moth habitat in Mount Urabu on Yonaguni Island (Attacus atlas ryukyuensis) (与那国島宇良部岳ヨナグニサン生息地) (Prefectural)
- Large deigo tree of Irimaka (西真嘉大デイゴ) (Municipal)
- Mitto Wetland of Kubura (久部良ミット湿地帯) (Municipal)
- Mount Kubura Natural Protected Area on Yonaguni Island (与那国島久部良岳天然保護区域) (Prefectural)

=== Yonaguni Monument ===
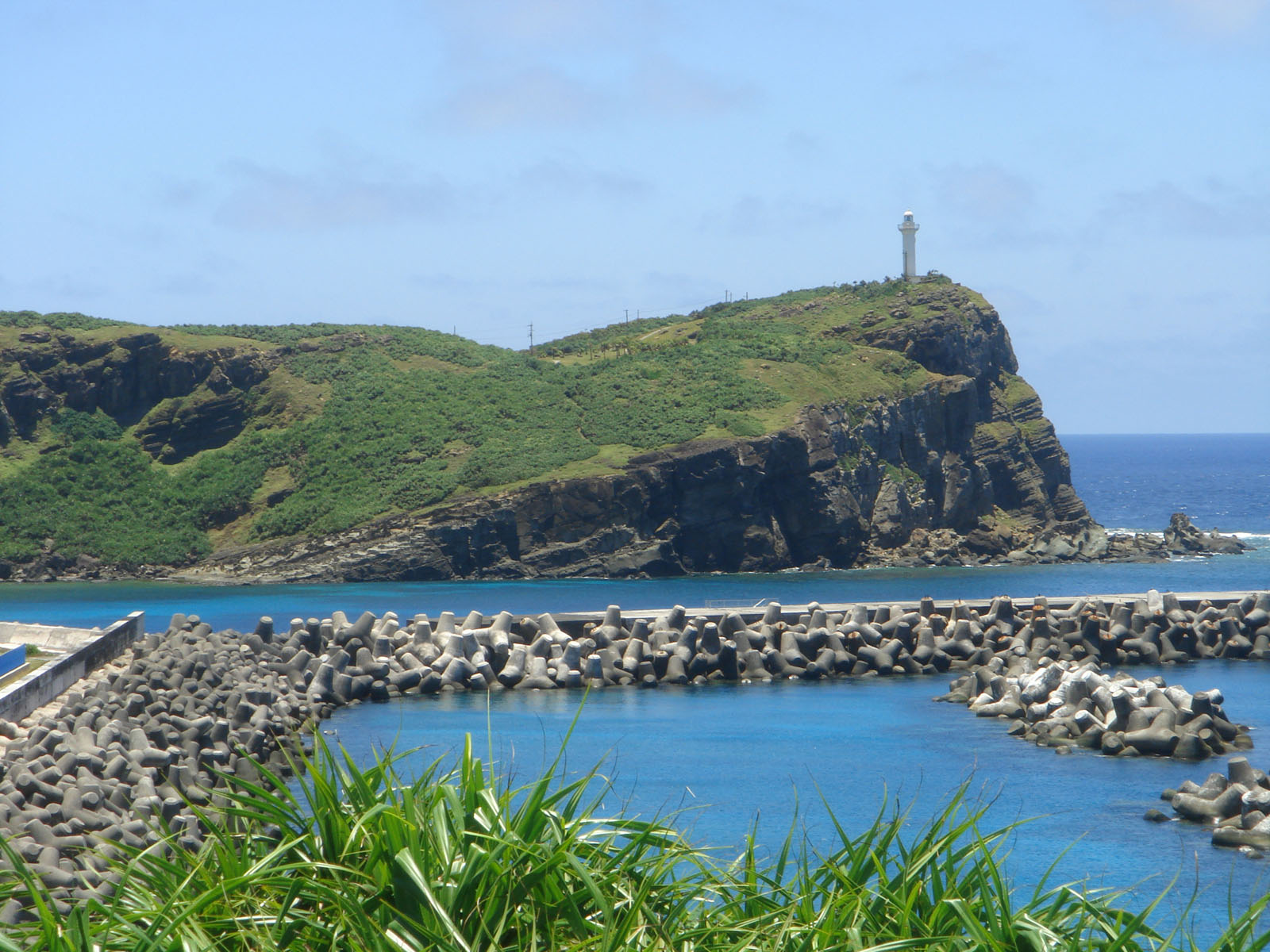
Irisati (西崎)

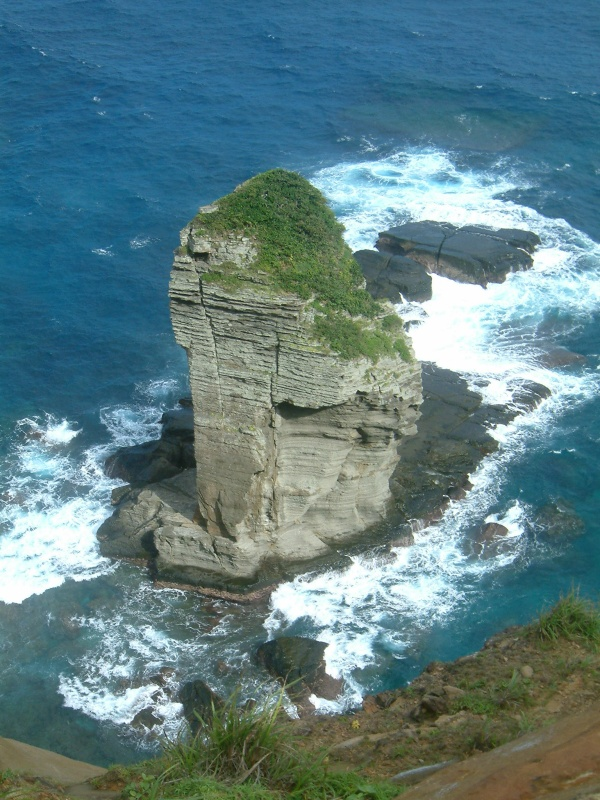
Tatigan (立神岩)

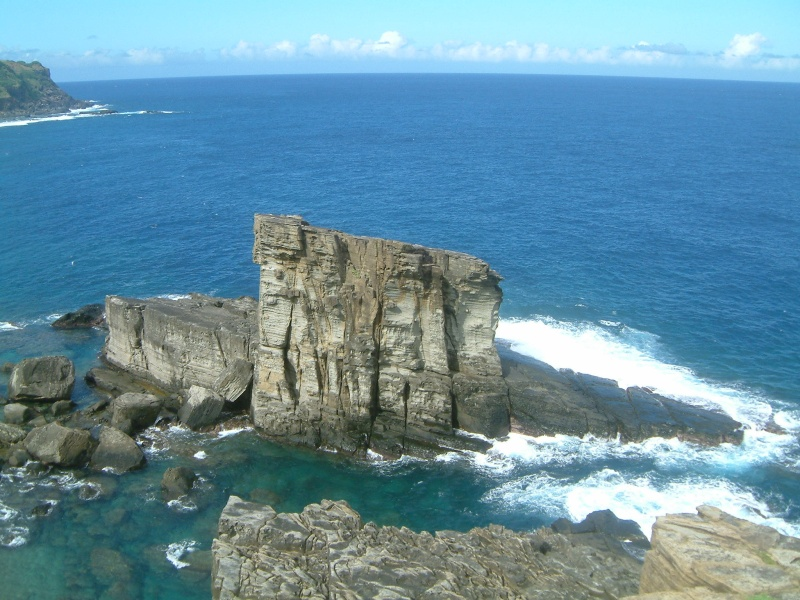
Gunkan icibugu (軍艦岩)

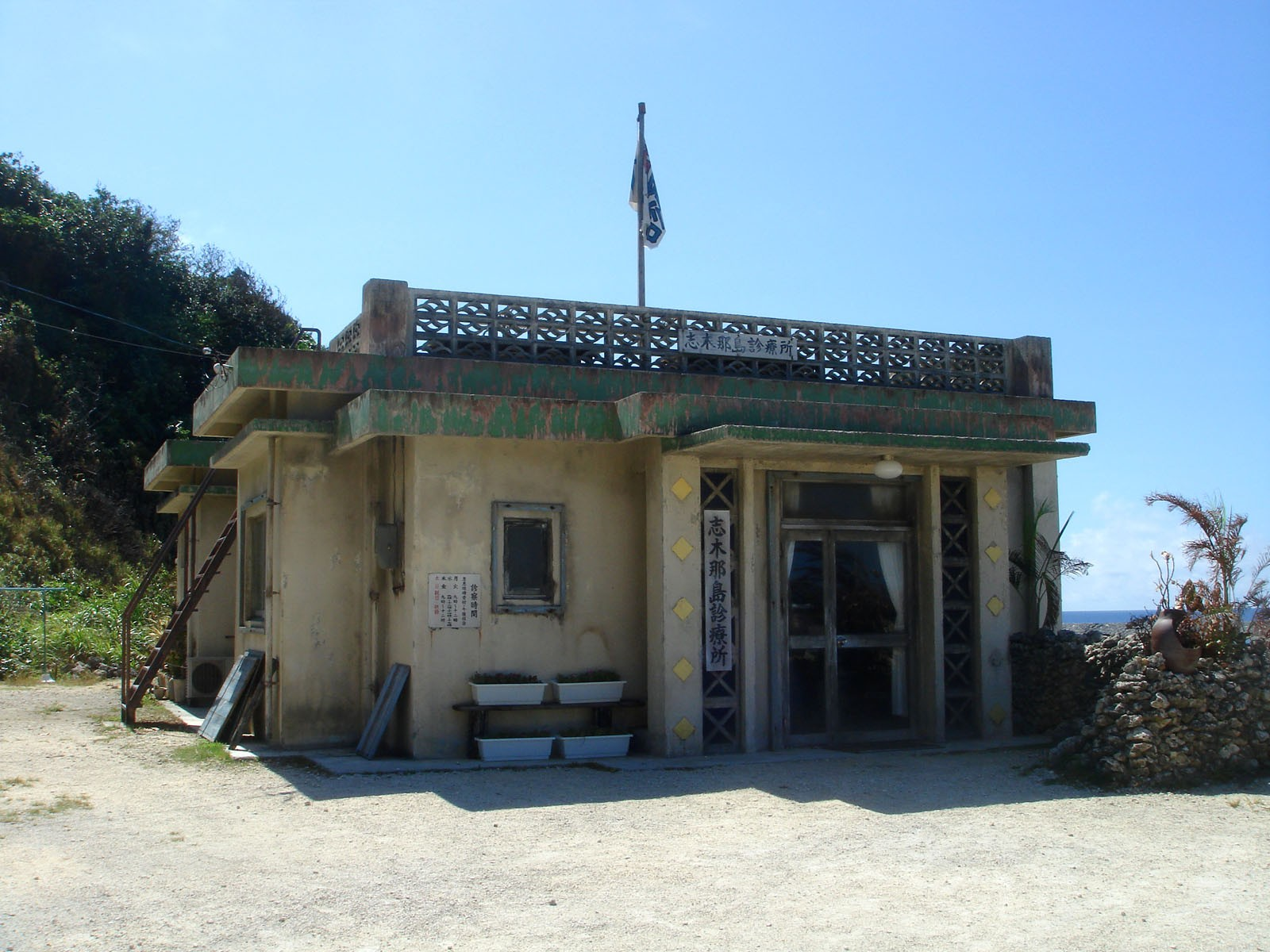
The open set of the TV drama series, Dr. Coto's Clinic

== Animals of special significance ==
- Atlas moth – Called ayami habiru locally, this is the world's largest moth. In Japan, it is found only in Yonaguni.
- Yonaguni horse – One of eight traditional Japanese horses, the smallest horse in Japan. Unable to be seen anywhere other than the island of Yonaguni.

== Broadcasting ==
Television broadcasts consist of translator stations in Yonaguni and Uchimichi and radio broadcasts are established from the Yonaguni television translator station. It is also the only place in Japan where all three NHK radio stations are on the FM band. In addition, Yonaguni receives Taiwanese television broadcasts (Taiwan Television (TTV), China Television (CTV), and Chinese Television System (CTS) by using the European DVB-T system), along with Taiwanese radio broadcasts.

=== List of broadcast station frequencies ===
==== TV translator frequencies ====
Location	NHK General TV	NHK Educational TV	Ryukyu Broadcasting Corporation (RBC)	Okinawa Television (OTV)
Yonaguni	37	39	41	43
Uchimichi	49	51	53	55

==== Radio translator frequencies (MHz) ====
Location	NHK1	NHK2	NHK3	Ryukyu Broadcasting Corporation (RBCi)	Radio Okinawa (ROK)
Yonaguni	83.5	80.3	85.8	84.7	79.5

== Other information ==
Through the cell towers on the east side of Taiwan that are geographically close to Yonaguni, it is possible depending on the weather to receive GSM phone service on Taiwanese phones from Irizaki (and it is possible that GSM phones from international carriers could use the service while roaming).
