= Okinawa Women's Junior College =

Coordinates: 26°11′56″N 127°42′12″E

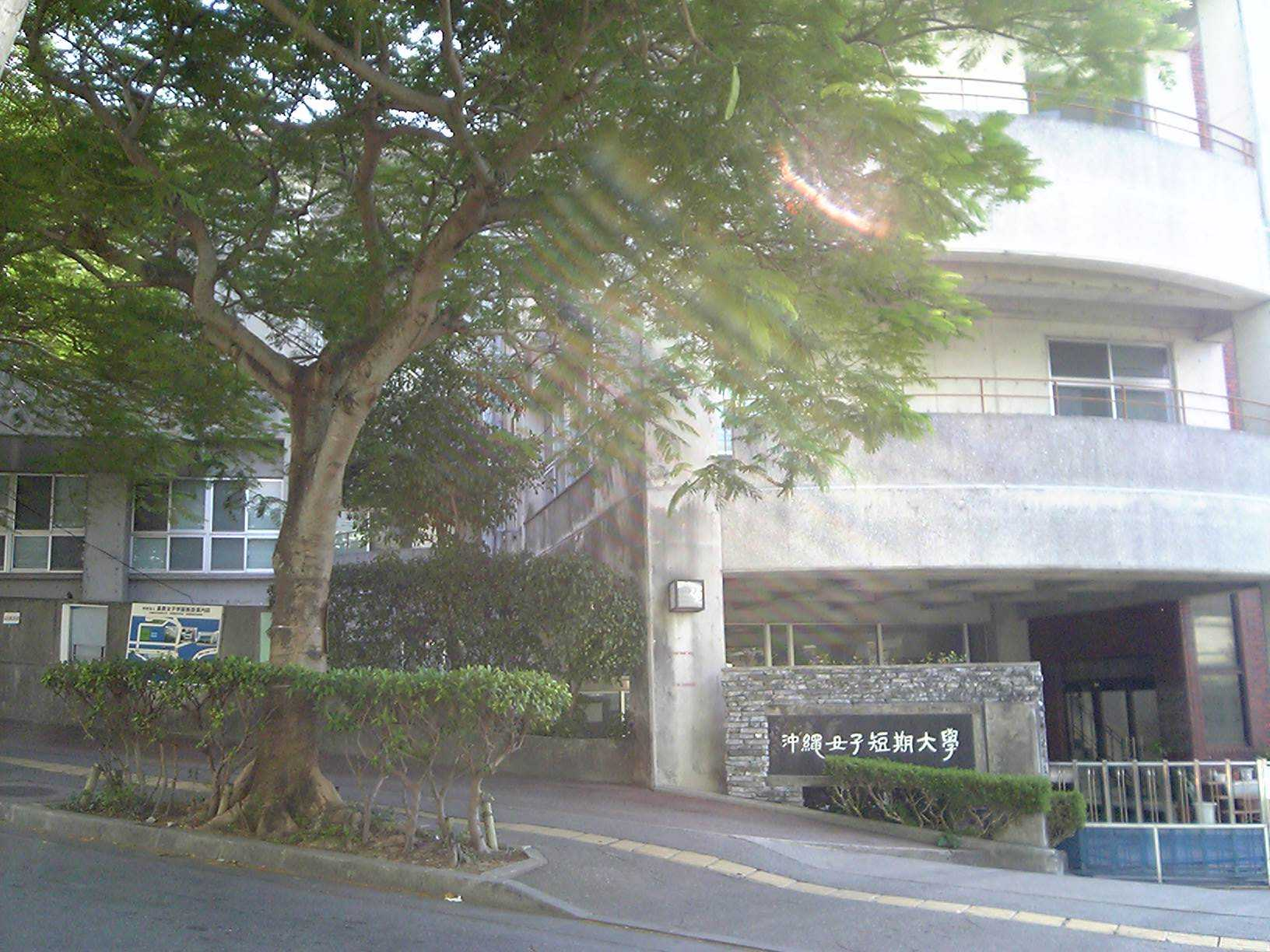
Okinawa Women's Junior College

Okinawa Women's Junior College (沖縄女子短期大学, Okinawa Joshi Tanki Daigaku) is a private junior college in Yonabaru, Okinawa, Japan, established in 1966. Contrary to its name, the college has been accepting male students since 2003. This college relocated from Naha, Okinawa to current location in 2015.
