= Yonaguni Airport =

Airport in Okinawa, Japan

Yonaguni Airport 与那国空港
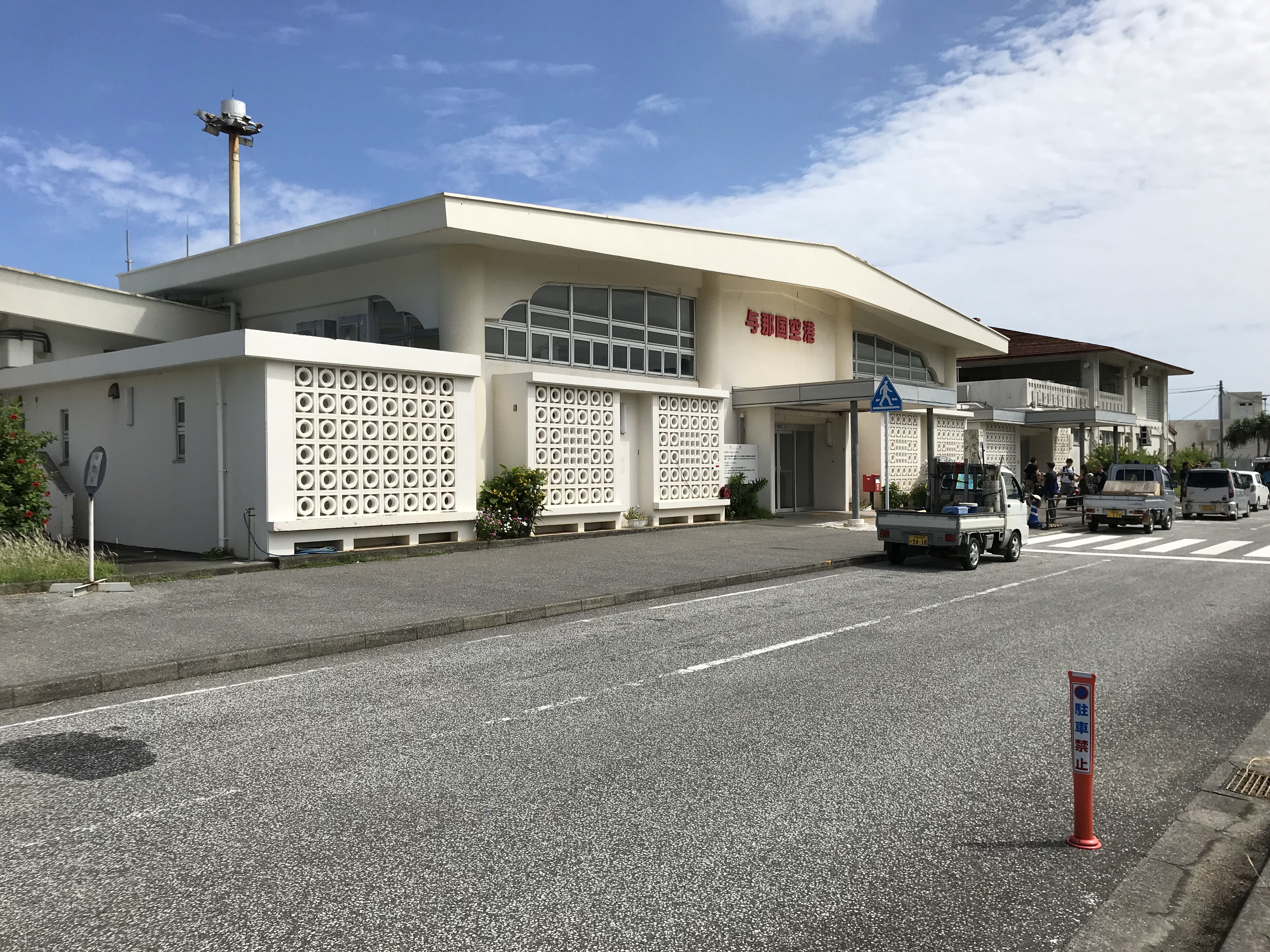
- IATA: OGN; ICAO: ROYN

Summary
- Airport type: Public
- Operator: Okinawa Prefecture
- Serves: Yonaguni, Okinawa, Japan
- Elevation AMSL: 49 ft (15 m)
- Coordinates: 24°28′03″N 122°58′47″E

Map
- Location in Japan ROYN (Japan)

Runways
| Direction | Length | | Surface |
| Direction | m | ft | Surface |
|---|---|---|---|
| 08/26 | 2,000 | 6,562 | Asphalt concrete |

Statistics (2015)
- Passengers: 94,684
- Cargo (metric tonnes): 323
- Aircraft movement: 3,154
- Source: Japanese Ministry of Land, Infrastructure, Transport and Tourism

Yonaguni Airport (与那国空港, Yonaguni Kūkō), (IATA: OGN, ICAO: ROYN) is a third-class airport located in Yonaguni, Yaeyama District, Okinawa Prefecture, Japan.

== History ==
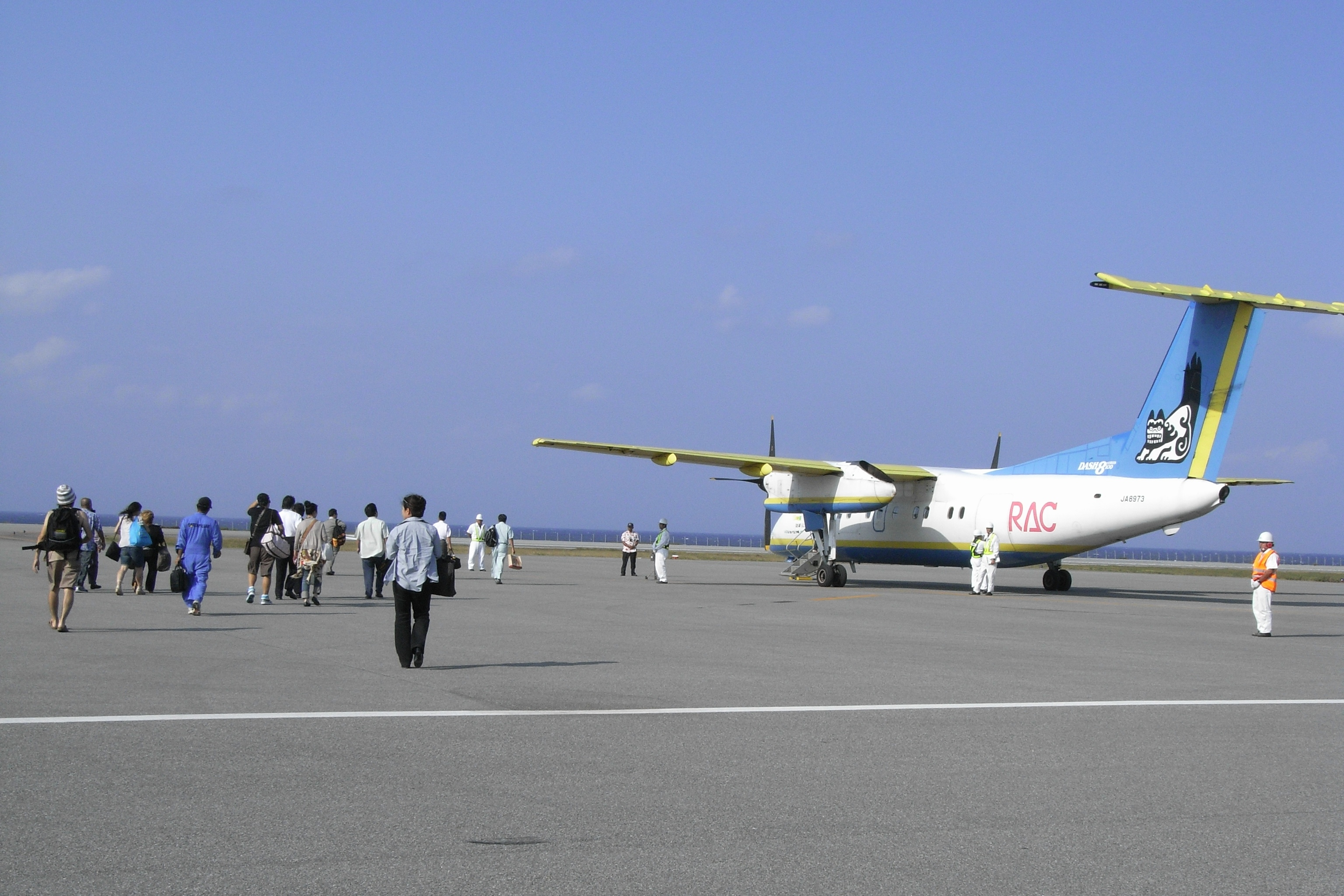
Ryukyu Air Commuter Bombardier Dash 8 Q100 at Yonaguni Airport

The airport opened in 1943 for military use, and became a civilian airport in 1957. International service started in 2007 with a charter flight to/from Taipei operated by Uni Air, with another flight to Hualien, Taiwan operated by TransAsia Airways the following year.

== Airlines and destinations ==
=== Passenger ===
| Airlines | Destinations |
|---|---|
| Ryukyu Air Commuter | Ishigaki, Naha |
