= Sonai dialect =

Sonai dialect may refer to:

- The Sonai dialect of the Yaeyama language, spoken on Iriomote Island
- The Sonai dialect of the Yonaguni language, spoken in Yonaguni
