= Shimakutuba Day =

Commemorative day in Okinawa Prefecture

Shimakutuba Day (Japanese: しまくとぅばの日, Hepburn: Shimakutuba no hi) is a commemorative day that was established in Okinawa Prefecture by the "Ordinance on Shimakutuba Day" (Okinawa Prefecture Ordinance No. 35 of March the 31st, 2006) in order to promote "Shimakutuba". It was set on September the 18th as a play on words, since, mixing Okinawan, Japanese and abbreviations, 九十八 (9-18) can be read ku-tu-ba.

"Shimakutuba" means literally "Island Speech" in Okinawan language, it includes all the languages used in the various Ryūkyū Islands.

In Okinawa Prefecture, until shortly after the Second World War, strong directives were given to promote the use of Japanese language so that the local languages declined and the Okinawan Japanese language, an Okinawan variant of the Japanese language, became the dominant form of everyday conversation. A 2013 survey in the prefecture showed that only 10% of the population used an island speech as their main way of communication. In the latest 2022 survey, this number has decreased to 5%.

Most of the Ryukyuan languages (Amami, Kunigami, Okinawa, Miyako, Yaeyama and Yonaguni languages) have been registered as endangered languages by the UNESCO in 2009.

With the deepening of movements trying to revive the local culture, Shimakutuba Day was established in 2006, aiming at "transmitting the island speech of each area to the next generation". It was the first time in Japan that an ordinance was passed in order to promote local languages.

Since the ordinance, and with the adoption in 2013 of the "Shimakutuba Promotion Plan", there are events to promote Ryūkyūan languages and symposiums held in many places throughout the islands each year on September the 18th.
