= Fortition =

Consonantal change

In articulatory phonetics, fortition, also known as strengthening, is a consonantal change that increases the degree or duration of stricture. It is the opposite of the more common lenition. For example, a fricative or an approximant may become a stop (i.e. [v] becomes [b] or [r] becomes [d]). Although not as typical of sound change as lenition, fortition may occur in prominent positions, such as at the beginning of a word or stressed syllable; as an effect of reducing markedness; or due to morphological leveling.

== Examples ==
The extremely common approximant sound [j] is sometimes subject to fortition; since it is a semivowel, almost any change to the sound other than simple deletion would constitute fortition. It has changed into the voiced fricative [ʝ] in a number of indigenous languages of the Arctic, such as the Eskimo–Aleut languages and Ket, also in some varieties of Spanish, and in the Sicilian language when the aforementioned semivowel is subjected to gemination. In Yonaguni (Southern Ryukyuan) and Maldivian (Indo-Aryan), it has changed word-initially into [d]. Via a voiceless palatal approximant, it has turned in some Germanic languages into [ç], the voiceless equivalent of [ʝ] and also cross-linguistically rare though less so than [ʝ]. Another change turned [j] to an affricate [dʒ] during the development of the Romance languages from Latin. A similar sound change from [j] to [z] can be seen in Kadazan, as observed in its name (compare to Kendayan).

Fortition of the cross-linguistically rare interdental fricatives [θ] and [ð] to the very common corresponding stops [t] and [d] is relatively common. This has occurred in most continental Germanic languages and several English dialects, several Uralic languages, and a few Semitic languages, among others. This has the result of reducing the markedness of the sounds [θ] and [ð].

Fortition also frequently occurs with voiceless versions of the common lateral approximant [l], usually sourced from combinations of [l] with a voiceless obstruent. The product is a voiceless alveolar lateral fricative [ɬ].

In Welsh, words inherited from Proto-Celtic with initial [l] or [r] hardened to [ɬ] and [r̥], respectively. Examples: Old Welsh lau /laʊ̯/ to Modern Welsh llaw /ɬaʊ̯/; Old Welsh ros /rɔs/ to Modern Welsh rhos /r̥ɔs/.

In the Cushitic language Iraqw, *d has lenited to /r/ between vowels, but *r has undergone fortition to /d/ word initially.

In Friulian, /ʒ/ > /d/: yoyba, jobia > dobia, doba; gel > dal; Lat. iuvenis > doven; Lat. iunius > dun.

Gemination of word-initial consonants occurs in Italian if a word-final stressed vowel precedes without intervening pause, in a process known as syntactic gemination. Final stressed vowels are by nature short, and short stressed vowels precede a consonant within a (phonetic) word only if that consonant ends the syllable. An item such as comprò 's/he bought' thus triggers gemination of the following consonant, whereas compra 's/he buys/is buying' does not: comprò la pasta [komˈprɔllaˈpasta] 's/he bought the pasta' but compra la pasta [ˈkompralaˈpasta] 's/he buys/is buying the pasta'.

In addition to language-internal development, fortition can also occur when a language acquires loanwords. Goidelic languages frequently display fortition in loanwords as most initial fricatives (except for [s̪], [ʃ] and [f]) are disallowed in the citation form of Goidelic words. Thus initial fricatives of loanwords are strengthened to the corresponding unlenited variant or the nearest equivalent if the fricative is not part of the phoneme inventory.

Examples from Scottish Gaelic:

/v/	→ /p/	Scots vervane, werwane ‘vervain’ → bearbhain /pɛɾavɛɲ/
/ʍ/	→ /kʰ/	Scots quhel ‘wheel’ → cuidheall /kʰujəl̪ˠ/
/w/	→ /p/	Middle English wall → balla /pal̪ˠə/
/f/	→ /p/	Latin fundus → bonn /pɔun̪ˠ/ (foundation)
/θ/	→ /t̪ʰ/	Norse þrǣll → tràill /t̪ʰɾaːʎ/ (slave)
/h/	→ /t̪ʰ/	Scots hogsheid ‘hogshead’ → tocasaid /t̪ʰɔʰkəs̪ətʲ/
/j/	→ /kʲ/	English yawl → geòla /kʲɔːl̪ˠə/

== Post-nasal fortition ==
Post-nasal fortition is very common in Bantu languages. For example, Swahili l and r become d after a nasal prefix, and w becomes b; voiceless stops become aspirated. In Shambala, l and r become d, and h and gh [ɣ] become p and g as well. In Bukusu, v [β] and w become b, y becomes j [dʒ], and l, r become d. In other languages, voiceless fricatives f, s, hl become affricates pf, ts, tl; see for example Xhosa. This is similar to the epenthetic stop in words like dance ([ˈdæns ~ ˈdænts]) in many dialects of English, which effectively is fortition of fricative [s] to affricate [ts].

== See also ==
- Fortis and lenis
- Consonant mutation
- Final-obstruent devoicing
- Grimm's law
- Historical linguistics
- Sotho phonology
