= Old Japanese =

Oldest attested stage of the Japanese language

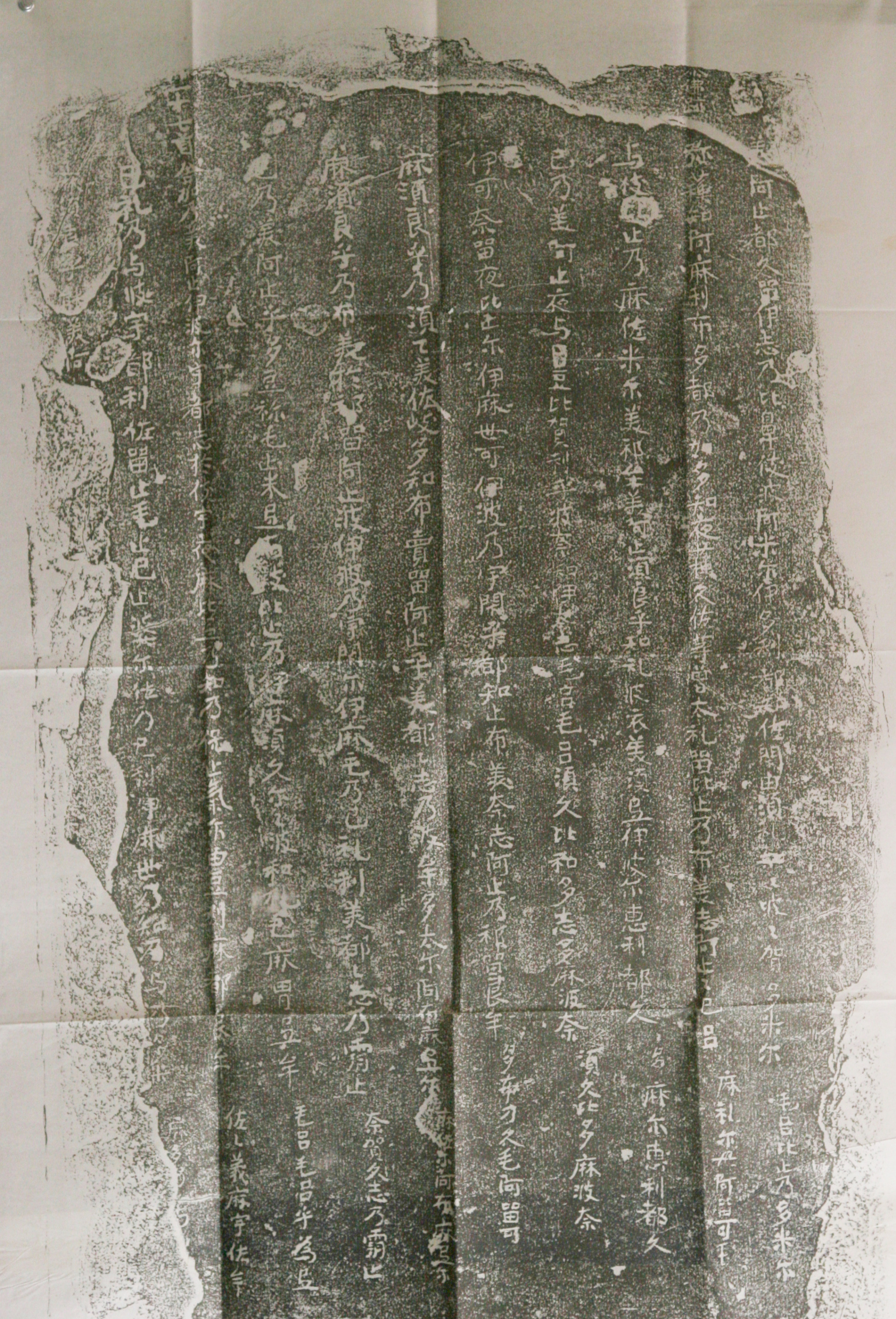
- Rubbing of Bussokuseki-kahi poems carved c. 752, recording Old Japanese using Chinese characters
- Region: Japan
- Era: 8th century
- Language family: Japonic: Insular; Old Japanese
- Early form: Proto-Japonic
- Writing system: Man'yōgana

Language codes
- ISO 639-3: ojp
- Glottolog: oldj1239

Old Japanese (上代日本語, Jōdai Nihon-go) is the oldest attested stage of the Japanese language, recorded in documents from the Nara period (8th century). It became Early Middle Japanese in the succeeding Heian period. Old Japanese is an early member of the Japonic language family. No genetic links to other language families have been proven.

The bulk of the Old Japanese corpus consists of poetry, especially the Man'yōshū, with a smaller number of formal prose works. These texts were written using man'yōgana, a writing system that employs Chinese characters as syllabograms or (occasionally) logograms. The language featured a few phonological differences from later forms, such as a simpler syllable structure and distinctions between several pairs of syllables that have been pronounced identically since Early Middle Japanese. The phonetic realization of these distinctions is uncertain. Internal reconstruction points to a pre-Old Japanese phase with fewer consonants and vowels.

As is typical of Japonic languages, Old Japanese is primarily an agglutinative language with a subject–object–verb word order, adjectives and adverbs preceding the nouns and verbs they modify and auxiliary verbs and particles appended to the main verb. Unlike later forms of Japanese, Old Japanese adjectives can be used uninflected to modify following nouns. Old Japanese verbs have a rich system of tense and aspect suffixes.

== Sources and dating ==
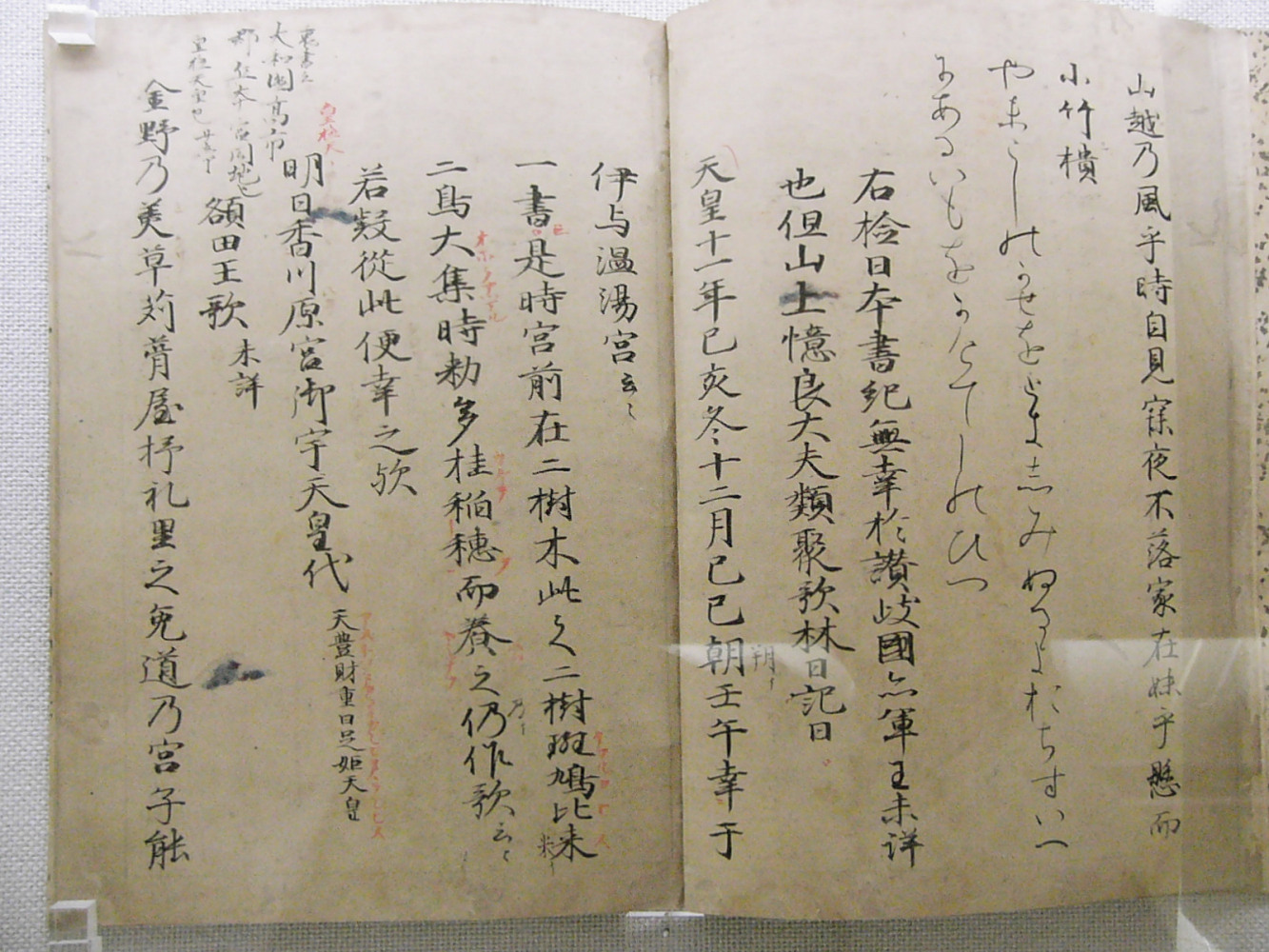
11th-century annotated manuscript of the Man'yōshū

Old Japanese is usually defined as the language of the Nara period (710–794), when the capital was Heijō-kyō (now Nara). That is the period of the earliest connected texts in Japanese, the 112 songs included in the Kojiki (712). The other major literary sources of the period are the 128 songs included in the Nihon Shoki (720) and the Man'yōshū (c. 759), a compilation of over 4,500 poems. Shorter samples are 25 poems in the Fudoki (720) and the 21 poems of the Bussokuseki-kahi (c. 752). The latter has the virtue of being an original inscription, whereas the oldest surviving manuscripts of all the other texts are the results of centuries of copying, with the attendant risk of scribal errors. Prose texts are more limited but are thought to reflect the syntax of Old Japanese more accurately than verse texts do. The most important are the 27 Norito ('liturgies') recorded in the Engishiki (compiled in 927) and the 62 Senmyō (literally 'announced order', meaning imperial edicts) recorded in the Shoku Nihongi (797).

A limited number of Japanese words, mostly personal names and place names, are recorded phonetically in ancient Chinese texts, such as the "Wei Zhi" portion of the Records of the Three Kingdoms (3rd century AD), but the transcriptions by Chinese scholars are unreliable. The oldest surviving inscriptions from Japan, dating from the 5th or early 6th centuries, include those on the Suda Hachiman Shrine Mirror, the Inariyama Sword, and the Eta Funayama Sword. Those inscriptions are written in Classical Chinese but contain several Japanese names that were transcribed phonetically using Chinese characters. Such inscriptions became more common from the Suiko period (592–628). Those fragments are usually considered a form of Old Japanese.

Of the 10,000 paper records kept at Shōsōin, only two, dating from about 762, are in Old Japanese. Over 150,000 wooden tablets (mokkan) dating from the late 7th and early 8th century have been unearthed. The tablets bear short texts, often in Old Japanese. Their language is more colloquial in style than the polished poems and liturgies of the primary corpus.

== Writing system ==
Artifacts inscribed with Chinese characters dated as early as the 1st century AD have been found in Japan, but detailed knowledge of the script seems not to have reached the islands until the early 5th century. According to the Kojiki and Nihon Shoki, the script was brought by scholars from Baekje (southwestern Korea). The earliest texts found in Japan were written in Classical Chinese, probably by immigrant scribes. Later "hybrid" texts show the influence of Japanese grammar, such as the word order (for example, the verb being placed after the object).

Chinese and Koreans had long used Chinese characters to write non-Chinese terms and proper names phonetically by selecting characters for Chinese words that sounded similar to each syllable. Koreans also used the characters phonetically to write Korean particles and inflections that were added to Chinese texts to allow them to be read as Korean (Idu script). In Japan, the practice was developed into man'yōgana, a complete script for the language that used Chinese characters phonetically, which was the ancestor of modern kana syllabaries. This system was already in use in the verse parts of the Kojiki (712) and the Nihon Shoki (720).

For example, the first line of the first poem in the Kojiki was written with five characters:

	夜	久	毛	多	都
Middle Chinese (Note: Readings are given in Baxter's transcription for Middle Chinese, omitting marking of tones, which are not relevant here.)	yae	kjuw	maw	ta	tu
Old Japanese	ya-kumo₁			tatu
	eight-cloud			rise.adn
	'many clouds rising'

This method of writing Japanese syllables by using characters for their Chinese sounds (ongana) was supplemented with indirect methods in the complex mixed script of the Man'yōshū (c. 759).

=== Syllables ===
In man'yōgana, each Old Japanese syllable was represented by a Chinese character. Although any of several characters could be used for a given syllable, a careful analysis reveals that 88 syllables were distinguished in early Old Japanese, typified by the Kojiki songs:

Syllables in early Old Japanese, with common man'yōgana (Note: These are the characters most used in the Kojiki songs, except for go₁ and zo₁ (which do not occur in the Kojiki) from the Man'yōshū.)
a 阿	ka 加,迦	ga 賀	sa 佐	za 邪	ta 多	da 陀	na 那	pa 波	ba 婆	ma 麻	ya 夜	ra 良	wa 和
i 伊	ki₁ 岐	gi₁ 芸	si 斯,志	zi 士	ti 知	di 遅	ni 爾,迩	pi₁ 比	bi₁ 毘	mi₁ 美		ri 理	wi 韋
i 伊	ki₂ 紀	gi₂ 疑	si 斯,志	zi 士	ti 知	di 遅	ni 爾,迩	pi₂ 斐	bi₂ 備	mi₂ 微		ri 理	wi 韋
u 宇	ku 久	gu 具	su 須	zu 受	tu 都	du 豆	nu 奴	pu 布	bu 夫	mu 牟	yu 由	ru 流	
e 亜	ke₁ 祁	ge₁ 牙	se 勢,世	ze 是	te 弖	de 傅	ne 泥	pe₁ 弊	be₁ 辨	me₁ 賣	ye 延	re 禮	we 恵
e 亜	ke₂ 気	ge₂ 宜	se 勢,世	ze 是	te 弖	de 傅	ne 泥	pe₂ 閇	be₂ 倍	me₂ 米	ye 延	re 禮	we 恵
o 淤,意	ko₁ 古	go₁ 胡,呉	so₁ 蘇	zo₁ 俗,蘇	to₁ 斗	do₁ 度	no₁ 怒	po 富,本	bo 煩	mo₁ 毛	yo₁ 用	ro₁ 漏,路	wo 袁,遠
o 淤,意	ko₂ 許	go₂ 碁	so₂ 曾	zo₂ 叙	to₂ 登	do₂ 杼	no₂ 能	po 富,本	bo 煩	mo₂ 母	yo₂ 余,與	ro₂ 呂	wo 袁,遠

Shinkichi Hashimoto discovered in 1917 that many syllables that have a modern i, e or o occurred in two forms, termed types A (甲, kō) and B (乙, otsu). These are denoted by subscripts 1 and 2 respectively in the above table. The syllables mo₁ and mo₂ are not distinguished in the slightly later Nihon Shoki and Man'yōshū, reducing the syllable count to 87. Some authors also believe that two forms of po were distinguished in the Kojiki. All of these pairs had merged in the Early Middle Japanese of the Heian period.

The consonants g, z, d, b and r did not occur at the start of a word. Conversely, syllables consisting of a single vowel were restricted to word-initial position, with very few exceptions. The traditional view is that the system has gaps where yi and wu might be expected, as in later forms of Japanese. Alexander Vovin argues that the non-initial syllables i and u in words such as kai 'oar', ko₂i 'to lie down', kui 'to regret' (with conclusive kuyu), oi 'to age' and uuru, the adnominal form of the verb uwe 'to plant', should be read as Old Japanese syllables yi and wu.

Frequencies of Old Japanese syllables in the Man'yōshū
	-	k-	g-	s-	z-	t-	d-	n-	p-	b-	m-	y-	r-	w-
-a	4612	7616	3358	3473	255	5212	734	5891	6450	2195	6018	3184	4213	2581
-i₁	3679	5771	762	8070	350	2195	335	7101	3489	585	5818		3901	270
-i₂	3679	690	404	8070	350	2195	335	7101	756	140	589		3901	270
-u	1556	4855	444	2507	904	4417	1065	1449	2905	389	2692	2190	3656	
-e₁	45	1145	13	1220	210	2831	727	1425	1101	203	318	644	2598	342
-e₂	45	1011	489	1220	210	2831	727	1425	959	287	1406	644	2598	342
-o₁	2441	1995	138	536	8	485	269	583	1870	75	7788	871	215	3657
-o₂	2441	3407	436	1206	122	5848	882	9618	1870	75	7788	1312	1177	3657

The rare vowel i₂ almost always occurred at the end of a morpheme. Most occurrences of e₁, e₂ and o₁ were also at the end of a morpheme.

The mokkan typically did not distinguish voiced from voiceless consonants, and wrote some syllables with characters that had fewer strokes and were based on older Chinese pronunciations imported via the Korean peninsula. For example,

- ki₁ was written with the character 支, pronounced *kje in Old Chinese and tsye in Middle Chinese, and
- to₂ was written with the character 止, pronounced *tjəʔ in Old Chinese and tsyi in Middle Chinese.

=== Transcription ===
Several different notations for the type A/B distinction are found in the literature, including:

Common notations for the type A/B distinction
index notation	i₁	i₂	e₁	e₂	o₁	o₂
Kindaichi, Miller, Tōdō	i	ï	e	ë	o	ö
Vovin	i	ï	e	ɛ	o	ə
modified Mathias–Miller	î	ï	ê	ë	ô	ö
Yale (Martin)	yi	iy	ye	ey	wo	o̠
Unger, Frellesvig and Whitman	i	wi	ye	e	wo	o

== Phonology ==
There is no consensus on the pronunciation of the syllables distinguished by man'yōgana. One difficulty is that the Middle Chinese pronunciations of the characters used are also disputed, and since the reconstruction of their phonetic values is partly based on later Sino-Japanese pronunciations, there is a danger of circular reasoning. Additional evidence has been drawn from phonological typology, subsequent developments in the Japanese pronunciation, and the comparative study of the Ryukyuan languages.

=== Consonants ===
Miyake reconstructed the following consonant inventory:

Old Japanese consonants
		Labial	Dental		Palatal	Velar
Obstruent	voiceless	*p	*t	*s		*k
Obstruent	voiced prenasalized	*ᵐb	*ⁿd	*ⁿz		*ᵑɡ
Nasal		*m	*n			
Liquid			*r			
Approximant		*w			*j	

The voiceless obstruents /p, t, s, k/ had voiced prenasalized counterparts /ᵐb, ⁿd, ⁿz, ᵑɡ/ that occurred only in medial position. Prenasalization was still present in the late 17th century (according to the Korean textbook Ch'ŏphae Sinŏ) and is found in some Modern Japanese and Ryukyuan dialects, but it has disappeared in modern Japanese except for the intervocalic nasal stop allophone [ŋ] of /ɡ/. The sibilants /s/ and /ⁿz/ may have been palatalized before e and i.

Comparative evidence from Ryukyuan languages suggests that Old Japanese p reflected an earlier voiceless bilabial stop *p. Further confirmation comes from Old Japanese loanwords in Ainu. There is general agreement that word-initial p had become a voiceless bilabial fricative [ɸ] by Early Modern Japanese, as suggested by its transcription as f in later Portuguese works and as ph or hw in the Korean textbook Ch'ŏphae Sinŏ. In Modern Standard Japanese, it is romanized as h and has different allophones before various vowels. In medial position, it became [w] in Early Middle Japanese and has since disappeared except before a. Many scholars, following Shinkichi Hashimoto, argue that p had already lenited to [ɸ] by the Old Japanese period, but Miyake argues that the choice of kanji indicates that it was still a stop.

=== Vowels ===
The Chinese characters chosen to write syllables with the Old Japanese vowel a suggest that it was an open unrounded vowel /a/. The vowel u was a close back rounded vowel /u/, unlike the unrounded /ɯ/ of Modern Standard Japanese.

Several hypotheses have been advanced to explain the A/B distinctions made in man'yōgana. The issue is hotly debated, and there is no consensus. The traditional view, first advanced by Kyōsuke Kindaichi in 1938, is that there were eight pure vowels, with the type B vowels being more central than their type A counterparts. Others, beginning in the 1930s but more commonly since the work of Roland Lange in 1968, have attributed the type A/B distinction to medial or final glides /j/ and /w/. The diphthong proposals are often connected to hypotheses about pre-Old Japanese, but all exhibit an uneven distribution of glides.

Examples of reconstructions of type A/B distinctions
i₁	i₂	e₁	e₂	o₁	o₂	Author
i	wi	e	we	wo	o	Kikusawa (1935)
i	ï	e	ë	o	ö	Kindaichi (1938), Miller (1967)
i	ïj	e	əj	o	ə	Arisaka (1955)
ji	i	je	e	o	ɵ	Hattori (1958)
ji	i	je	e	wo	o	Lange (1968, 1973)
i	wi	je	e	wo	o	Unger (1977), Frellesvig and Whitman (2008)
i	ï	e	ɛ	o	ɵ	Ōno (1982)
i	ɨ	e	əj	o	ə	Miyake (2003)

The distinction between mo₁ and mo₂ was seen only in Kojiki and vanished afterwards. The distribution of syllables suggests that there may have once been *po₁, *po₂, *bo₁ and *bo₂.

=== Accent ===
Although modern Japanese dialects have pitch-accent systems, pitch distinctions were usually not shown in man'yōgana. However, in one part of the Nihon Shoki, the Chinese characters appeared to have been chosen to represent pitch patterns similar to those recorded in the Ruiju Myōgishō, a dictionary that was compiled in the late 11th century. In that section, a low-pitch syllable was represented by a character with the Middle Chinese level tone and a high pitch was represented by a character with one of the other three Middle Chinese tones. A similar division was used in the tone patterns of Chinese poetry, which were emulated by Japanese poets in the late Asuka period. Thus, it appears that the Old Japanese accent system was similar to that of Early Middle Japanese.

=== Phonotactics ===
Old Japanese words consisted of one or more open syllables of the form (C)V, subject to additional restrictions:

- Words did not begin with r or the voiced obstruents b, d, z, and g, with the exception of a few loanwords.
- A bare vowel did not occur except for word-initially: vowel sequences were not permitted.

In 1934, Hideyo Arisaka proposed a set of phonological restrictions permitted in a single morpheme. Arisaka's Law states that -o₂ was generally not found in the same morpheme as -a, -o₁ or -u. Some scholars have interpreted that as a vestige of earlier vowel harmony, but it is very different from patterns that are observed in, for example, the Turkic languages.

=== Morphophonemics ===
Two adjacent vowels fused to form a new vowel when a consonant was lost within a morpheme, or a compound was lexicalized as a single morpheme. The following fusions occurred:

i₁ + a → e₁
- saki₁ 'bloom' + ari 'exist' → sake₁ri 'be blooming'
- ki₁ 'wear' + aru 'be.ATT' → ke₁ru 'wear.FIN'
Further examples are provided by verbs ending with the past tense suffix -ki₁ and the verbal auxiliaries amu 'conjecture' or ari 'exist':
- tir-i-ki₁ 'fall, scatter.INF.PST' + am-u → tirike₁mu '(it) has surely fallen'
- ari-ki₁ 'exist.INF.PST' + ar-i → arike₁ri 'it existed'
i₁ + o₂ → e₁
- utusi 'real' + oyomi₁ 'person' → utuse₁mi₁ 'living person' (Note: An alternative form, utuso₂mi₁, obtained by deleting the vowel -i, is also attested.)
a + i → e₂
- naga 'long' + iki₁ 'breath' → nage₂ki₁ 'sigh'
- taka 'high' + iti 'market' → take₂ti (place name)
o₂ + i → e₂
- tono 'palace' + iri 'enter' → toneri 'attendant'
o₂ + i → i₂
- opo 'big' + isi 'rock' → opi₂si 'big rock'
u + i → i₂
- waku 'young' + iratuko₁ 'term of veneration (male)' → waki₂ratuko₁ (title)
u + a → o₁
- kazu 'number' + ape₂ 'to join' → kazo₁pe₂ 'to count'
u + o → o₁
- situ 'ancient type of native weaving' + ori 'weaving' → sito₁ri 'native weaving'

Adjacent vowels belonging to different morphemes, or pairs of vowels for which none of the above fusions applied, were reduced by deleting one or other of the vowels. Most often, the first of the adjacent vowels was deleted:

- to₂ko₂ 'eternal' + ipa 'rock' → to₂ki₁pa 'eternal rock; everlasting'
- ama 'heaven' + ori 'descend' → amori 'descend from heaven'

The exception to this rule occurred when the first of the adjacent vowels was the sole vowel of a monosyllabic morpheme (usually a clitic), in which case the other vowel was deleted:

- mi₁ (honorific) + uma 'horse' → mi₁ma 'honourable horse'
- ko₁ 'child, egg' + umu 'birth' → ko₁mu 'give birth, lay an egg'

Cases where both outcomes are found are attributed to different analyses of morpheme boundaries:

- waga 'my' + ipe₁ 'house' → wagi₁pe₁ 'my house'
- wa 'I' + ga GEN + ipe₁ 'house' → wagape₁ 'my house'

=== Pre-Old Japanese ===
Internal reconstruction suggests that the stage preceding Old Japanese had fewer consonants and vowels.

==== Consonants ====
Internal reconstruction suggests that the Old Japanese voiced obstruents, which always occurred in medial position, arose from the weakening of earlier nasal syllables before voiceless obstruents:

- b /ᵐb/ < *-mVp-, *-nVp-: e.g. ami₁ 'net' + pi₁ki₁ 'pull' → abi₁ki₁ 'trawling'
- d /ⁿd/ < *-mVt-, *-nVt-: e.g. yama 'mountain' + mi₁ti 'path' → yamadi 'mountain path'
- z /ⁿz/ < *-mVs-, *-nVs-: e.g. mura 'village' + nusi 'master' → murazi (title)
- g /ᵑɡ/ < *-mVk-, *-nVk-

In some cases, such as tubu 'grain', kadi 'rudder' and pi₁za 'knee', there is no evidence for a preceding vowel, which leads some scholars to posit final nasals at the earlier stage.

Some linguists suggest that Old Japanese w and y derive, respectively, from *b and *d at some point before the oldest inscriptions in the 6th century. Southern Ryukyuan varieties such as Miyako, Yaeyama and Yonaguni have /b/ corresponding to Old Japanese w, but only Yonaguni (at the far end of the chain) has /d/ where Old Japanese has y:

- ba 'I' and bata 'stomach' corresponding to Old Japanese wa and wata
- Yonaguni da 'house', du 'hot water' and dama 'mountain' corresponding to Old Japanese ya, yu and yama

However, many linguists, especially in Japan, argue that the Southern Ryukyuan voiced stops are local innovations, adducing a variety of reasons.

Some supporters of *b and *d also add *z and *g, which both disappeared in Old Japanese, for reasons of symmetry. However, there is very little Japonic evidence for them.

==== Vowels ====
As seen in § Morphophonemics, many occurrences of the rare vowels i₂, e₁, e₂ and o₁ arise from fusion of more common vowels. Similarly, many nouns having independent forms ending in -i₂ or -e₂ also have bound forms ending in a different vowel, which are believed to be older. For example, sake₂ 'rice wine' has the form saka- in compounds such as sakaduki 'sake cup'. The following alternations are the most common:

- i₂/u-: kami₂/kamu- 'god, spirit', mi₂/mu- 'body', nagi₂/nagu- 'a calm'. tuki₂/tuku- 'moon', kuki₂/kuku- 'stalk'.
- i₂/o₂-: ki₂/ko₂- 'tree', yomi₂/yomo₂- 'Hades',
- e₂/a-: me₂/ma- 'eye', ame₂/ama- 'heaven', ame₂/ama- 'rain', kage₂/kaga- 'shade', ke₂/ka- 'day, sun', tume₂/tuma- 'nail, hoof', take₂/taka- 'bamboo'.

The widely accepted analysis of this situation is that the most common Old Japanese vowels a, u, i₁ and o₂ reflect earlier *a, *u, *i and *ə respectively, and the other vowels reflect fusions of these vowels:

- i₂ < *ui, *əi
- e₁ < *ia, *iə
- e₂ < *ai
- o₁ < *ua, *uə

Thus the above independent forms of nouns can be derived from the bound form and a suffix *-i. The origin of this suffix is debated, with one proposal being the ancestor of the obsolescent particle i (whose function is also uncertain), and another being a weakened consonant (suggested by proposed Korean cognates).

There are also alternations suggesting e₂ < *əi, such as se₂/so₂- 'back' and me₂/mo₂- 'bud'. Some authors believe that they belong to an earlier layer than i₂ < *əi, but others reconstruct two central vowels *ə and *ɨ, which merged everywhere except before *i. Other authors attribute the variation to different reflexes in different dialects and note that *əi yields e in Ryukyuan languages.

Some instances of word-final e₁ and o₁ are difficult to analyse as fusions, and some authors postulate *e and *o to account for such cases. A few alternations, as well as comparisons with Eastern Old Japanese and Ryukyuan languages, suggest that *e and *o also occurred in non-word-final positions at an earlier stage but were raised in such positions to i₁ and u, respectively, in central Old Japanese. The mid vowels are also found in some early mokkan and in some modern Japanese dialects.

== Morphology ==
Old Japanese nominals tend to have simple morphology and little fusion, in contrast to the complex inflectional morphology of verbs. Japanese at all stages has used prefixes with both nouns and verbs, but Old Japanese also used prefixes for grammatical functions later expressed using suffixes. This is atypical of SOV languages, and may suggest that the language was in the final stage of a transition from a SVO typology.

=== Nominals ===
==== Pronouns ====
Old Japanese include personal pronouns, demonstratives and an isolated interrogative pronoun nani 'what'. Many pronouns have both a short form and a longer form with attached -re of uncertain etymology. If the pronoun occurs in isolation, the longer form is used. The short form is used with genitive particles or in nominal compounds, but in other situations either form is possible.

Personal pronouns are distinguished by taking the genitive marker ga, in contrast to the marker no₂ used with demonstratives and nouns.

- The first-person pronouns, a(re) and wa(re), are used for the singular and plural respectively, though with some overlap. The wa- forms are also used reflexively, which suggests that wa was originally an indefinite pronoun and gradually replaced a.
- The second-person pronoun is na(re).
- The third-person pronoun si is much less commonly used than the non-proximal demonstrative so₂ from which it was derived.
- There is also an interrogative pronoun ta(re) and a reflexive pronoun ono₂.

Demonstratives often distinguish proximal (to the speaker) and non-proximal forms marked with ko₂- and so₂- respectively. Many forms have corresponding interrogative forms i(du)-.

Old Japanese demonstratives
	Proximal	Non-proximal	Interrogative
Nominal	ko₂(re)	so₂	idu(re)
Location	ko₂ko₂	so₂ko₂	iduku
Direction	ko₂ti	so₂ti	iduti
Degree	ko₂kV-	so₂kV-	iku-
Manner	ka	sate	–
Manner	kaku	sika	ika
Time	–	–	itu

In Early Middle Japanese, the non-proximal so- forms were reinterpreted as hearer-based (medial), and the speaker-based forms were divided into proximal ko- forms and distal ka-/a- forms, yielding the three-way distinction that is still found in Modern Japanese.

==== Numerals ====
In later texts, such as the Man'yōshū, numerals are sometimes written using Chinese logographs, which give no indication of pronunciation. The following numerals are attested phonographically:

Phonographically attested Old Japanese cardinal numerals
1 pi₁to₂	10 to₂wo	100 mo₁mo₁	1000 ti	10,000 yo₂ro₂du
2 puta	20 pata			
3 mi₁	30 mi₁so₁			
4 yo₂	40 yo₂so₁			
5 itu	50 (iso₁)	500 ipo		
6 mu				
7 nana	70 (nanaso₁)			
8 ya	80 yaso₁	800 yapo		
9 ko₂ko₂no				

The forms for 50 and 70 are known only from Heian texts.

There is a single example of a phonographically recorded compound number, in Bussokuseki 2:

mi₁so-ti amar-i puta-tu no₂ katati
thirty-CL exceed-INF two-CL GEN mark
'thirty-two marks'

This example uses the classifiers -ti (used with tens and hundreds) and -tu (used with digits and hundreds).

The only attested ordinal numeral is patu 'first'. In Classical Japanese, the other ordinal numerals have the same form as cardinals. This may also have been the case for Old Japanese, but there are no textual occurrences to settle the question.

==== Classifiers ====
The classifier system of Old Japanese is much less developed than at later stages of the language, and classifiers are not obligatory between numerals and nouns. A few bound forms are attested phonographically: -tu (used with digits and hundreds), -ti (used with tens and hundreds), -ri (for people), -moto₂, -pe₁ (for grassy plants) and -ri (for days). Many ordinary nouns can also be used either freely or as classifiers.

==== Prefixes ====
Old Japanese nominal prefixes include honorific mi-, intensive ma- from ma 'truth', diminutive or affectionate wo- and a prefix sa- of uncertain function.

==== Suffixes ====
Old Japanese nominals have suffixes or particles to mark diminutives, plural number and case. When multiple suffixes occur, case markers come last. Unmarked nouns (but not pronouns) are neutral as to number. The main plural markers are the general-purpose ra and two markers restricted to animate nouns, do₂mo₂ (limited to five words) and tati.

The main case particles are

- accusative wo marks objects (as in later Japanese) but also adverbials of duration.
- genitive no₂ (unrestricted) and ga (restricted to people). In Late Middle Japanese, ga shifted to a nominative case marker.
- dative or locative ni
- ablative yo₁ri ~ yo₁ ~ yuri ~ yu from yuri 'after(wards)'. Only the form yori survived in Early Middle Japanese.
- comitative to₂

The subject of a sentence is usually not marked. There are a few cases in the Senmyō of subjects of active verbs marked with a suffix -i, which is thought to be an archaism that was obsolete in the Old Japanese period.

=== Verbs ===
Old Japanese has a richer system of verbal suffixes than later forms of Japanese. Old Japanese verbs use inflection for modal and conjunctional purposes. Other categories, such as voice, tense, aspect and mood, are expressed by using optional suffixed auxiliaries, which are also inflected:

mayo₁pi₁-ki₁-ni-ke₁ri
fray-come-PERF-MPST.CONCL
'had become frayed' (Man'yōshū 14.3453)

==== Inflected forms ====
As in later forms of Japanese, Old Japanese verbs have a large number of inflected forms. In traditional Japanese grammar, they are represented by six forms (katsuyōkei, 活用形) from which all the others may be derived in a similar fashion to the principal parts used for Latin and other languages:

Mizenkei (irrealis)
This form never occurs in isolation but only as a stem to which several particles and auxiliaries are attached. This stem originated from resegmentation of an initial *a of several suffixes (auxiliary verbs) as part of the stem.
Ren'yōkei (adverbial, infinitive)
This form is used to mark a predicate as coordinate with a following predicate. It also serves as a stem for auxiliaries expressing tense and aspect, as well as suffixes -te and -tutu of adverbial subordinate forms.
Shūshikei (conclusive, predicative)
This form is used as the main verb concluding a declarative sentence. It is also used as a stem to which modal extensions, final particles, and some conjunctional particles are attached. The conclusive form merged with the attributive form by about 1600, but the distinction is preserved in the Ryukyuan languages and Hachijō.
Rentaikei (attributive, adnominal)
This form is used as the verb in a nominalized clause or a clause modifying a noun. It also serves as a stem for the nominalizing suffix -aku and most conjunctional particles.
Izenkei (realis, exclamatory, subjunctive)
This form is used as the main verb in an exclamatory sentence or as the verb in an adverbial clause. It also serves as a stem for the particles ba (provisional) and do (concessive).
Meireikei (imperative)
This form expresses the imperative mood.

This system has been criticized because the six forms are not equivalent, with one being solely a combinatory stem, three solely word forms, and two being both. It also fails to capture some inflected forms. However, five of the forms are basic inflected verb forms, and the system also describes almost all extended forms consistently.

==== Conjugation classes ====
Old Japanese verbs are classified into eight conjugation classes that were originally defined for the classical Japanese of the late Heian period. In each class, the inflected forms showed a different pattern of rows of a kana table. These rows correspond to the five vowels of later Japanese, but the discovery of the A/B distinction in Old Japanese showed a more refined picture.

Three of the classes are grouped as consonant bases:

Yodan (quadrigrade)
This class of regular consonant-base verbs includes approximately 75% of verbs. The class is so named because the inflections in later forms of Japanese span four rows of a kana table, corresponding to four vowels. However, the discovery of the A/B distinction revealed that this class actually involved five different vowels in Old Japanese, with distinct vowels e₁ and e₂ in the exclamatory and imperative forms respectively. The bases are almost all of the form (C)VC-, with the final consonant being p, t, k, b, g, m, s or r.
Na-hen (n-irregular)
The three n-base verbs form a class of their own: sin- 'die', in- 'depart' and the perfective auxiliary -(i)n-. They are often described as a "hybrid" conjugation because the adnominal and exclamatory forms follow a similar pattern to vowel-base verbs.
Ra-hen (r-irregular)
The irregular r-base verbs are ar- 'be, exist' and other verbs that incorporate it, as well as wor- 'be sitting', which became the existential verb or- in later forms of Japanese.

Conjugation of consonant-base verbs
Verb class	Irrealis	Infinitive	Conclusive	Adnominal	Exclamatory	Imperative	Gloss
quadrigrade	kaka-	kaki₁	kaku	kaku	kake₂	kake₁	'write'
n-irregular	sina-	sini	sinu	sinuru	sinure	sine	'die'
r-irregular	ara-	ari	ari	aru	are	are	'be, exist'

The distinctions between i₁ and i₂ and between e₁ and e₂ are eliminated after s, z, t, d, n, y, r and w.

There are five vowel-base conjugation classes:

Shimo nidan (lower bigrade or e-bigrade)
The largest regular vowel-base class ends in e₂ and includes approximately 20% of verbs.
Kami nidan (upper bigrade or i-bigrade)
This class includes about 30 verbs whose bases end in i₂.
Kami ichidan (upper monograde or i-monograde)
This class contains about 10 verbs of the form (C)i₁-. Some monosyllabic i-bigrade verbs had already shifted to this class by Old Japanese, and the rest followed in Early Middle Japanese.
Ka-hen (k-irregular)
This class consists of the single verb ko₂- 'come'.
Sa-hen (s-irregular)
This class consists of the single verb se- 'do'.

Early Middle Japanese also has a Shimo ichidan (lower monograde or e-monograde) category, consisting of a single verb kwe- 'kick', which reflects the Old Japanese lower bigrade verb kuwe-.

Conjugation of vowel-base verbs
Verb class	Irrealis	Infinitive	Conclusive	Adnominal	Exclamatory	Imperative	Gloss
e-bigrade	ake₂-	ake₂	aku	akuru	akure	ake₂(yo₂)	'open'
i-bigrade	oki₂-	oki₂	oku	okuru	okure	oki₂(yo₂)	'arise'
monograde	mi₁-	mi₁	mi₁ru	mi₁ru	mi₁re	mi₁(yo₂)	'see'
k-irregular	ko₂-	ki₁	ku	kuru	kure	ko₂	'come'
s-irregular	se-	si	su	suru	sure	se(yo₂)	'do'

The bigrade verbs seem to belong to a later layer than other verbs. Many e-bigrade verbs are transitive or intransitive counterparts of consonant-base verbs. In contrast, i-bigrade verbs tend to be intransitive. Some bigrade bases also appear to reflect pre-Old-Japanese adjectives with vowel stems combined with an inchoative *-i suffix:

- *-a-i > -e₂, e.g. ake₂- 'redden, lighten' vs aka 'red'.
- *-u-i > -i₂, e.g. sabi₂- 'get desolate, fade' vs sabu- 'lonely'.
- *-ə-i > -i₂, e.g. opi₂- 'get big, grow' vs opo- 'big'.

==== Copulas ====
Old Japanese has two copulas with limited and irregular conjugations:

Old Japanese copulas
Infinitive	Adnominal	Gerund
ni	no₂	nite
to₂	tu	

The tu form had a limited distribution in Old Japanese, and disappeared in Early Middle Japanese. In later Japanese, the nite form became de, but these forms have otherwise endured to modern Japanese.

==== Verbal prefixes ====
Japanese has used verbal prefixes conveying emphasis at all stages, but Old Japanese also has prefixes expressing grammatical functions, such as reciprocal or cooperative api₁- (from ap- 'meet, join'), stative ari- (from ar- 'exist'), potential e₂- (from e₂- 'get') and prohibitive na-, which is often combined with a suffix -so₂.

==== Verbal auxiliaries ====
Old Japanese has a rich system of auxiliary elements that can be suffixed to verb stems and are themselves inflected, usually following the regular consonant-stem or vowel-stem paradigms, but never including the full range of forms found with full verbs. Many of these disappeared in later stages of the language.

Tense and aspect are indicated by suffixes attached to the infinitive. The tense suffixes are:

- the simple past -ki₁ (conclusive), -si (adnominal), -sika (exclamatory). The variation may indicate an origin in multiple forms. Indeed counterparts of -ki₁ are absent from Ryukyuan and weakly attested in Eastern Old Japanese.
- the modal past or retrospective -ke₁r-, a fusion of the simple past with ar- 'exist'.
- the past conjectural -ke₁m-, a fusion of the simple past with the conjectural suffix -am-.

The perfective suffixes are -n- and -te-. During the Late Middle Japanese period, the tense and aspect suffixes were replaced with a single past-tense suffix -ta, derived from -te + ar- 'exist' > -tar-. However, the Hachijō language retains some of the early tense and aspect system, in particular reflexes of the old past suffix -si and the distinction between -te ar- and ar- forms.

Other auxiliaries are attached to the irrealis stem:

- the negative -(a)n- and -(a)z- < *-(a)ni-su
- the passive -(a)ye- and -(a)re-
- the causative -(a)sime-
- the honorific -(a)s-
- the iterative -(a)p- or -op-
- the conjectural or tentative -(a)m-
- the subjunctive -(a)masi-

The honorific and iterative ceased to be productive in Middle Japanese. During the Early Middle Japanese period, the causative -(a)sime- was replaced by -(a)sase-.

=== Adjectives ===
Old Japanese adjectives were originally nominals and, unlike in later periods, can be used uninflected to modify following nouns. They can also take a suffix -ku (an adjectival copula), forming stative verbs conjugated in two classes:

Conjugation of stative verbs
Class	Stem	Infinitive	Conclusive	Adnominal	Exclamatory	Gloss
-ku	kata	kataku	katasi	kataki₁	katasa	'hard'
-siku	kusi	kusiku	kusi	kusiki₁	kusisa	'precious'

The second class, with stems ending in -si, differs only in the conclusive form, whose suffix -si was dropped by haplology. Adjectives of this class tend to express more subjective qualities. Many of them were formed from a verbal stem by the addition of a suffix -si of uncertain origin.

Towards the end of the Old Japanese period, a more expressive conjugation was formed by adding the verb ar- 'be' to the infinitive, with the sequence -ua- reducing to -a-:

Innovative conjugation of stative verbs
Irrealis	Infinitive	Adnominal	Gloss
katakara-	katakari	katakaru	'hard'

Many adjectival nouns of Early Middle Japanese were based on Old Japanese adjectives that were formed with suffixes -ka, -raka or -yaka.

== Syntax ==
As in later forms of Japanese, Old Japanese word order is predominantly subject–object–verb, with adjectives and adverbs preceding the nouns and verbs they modify and auxiliary verbs and particles consistently appended to the main verb.

ositeru nanipa no₂ mi₁ya ni wa go₂ opo-ki₁mi₁ kuni sir-asu rasi
push.shine.ADN Naniwa GEN palace LOC 1S GEN great-lord land rule-HON.CONCL PRES
'In the shining Naniwa palace, my lord might rule the land.' (Man'yōshū 6.933)

Questions, exclamations and prohibitives are marked using particles, either in the middle of the sentence or at the end, while imperatives are marked by conjugating the verb.

=== Focus construction ===
Old Japanese makes extensive use of a focus construction, known as kakari-musubi ('hanging-tying'), to express emphasis and questions. A focus particle marks a copular relation between the constituent preceding the particle and a predicate in the adnominal form, instead of the conclusive form usually found in declarative sentences. The marked constituent is also typically fronted in comparison with its position in a corresponding declarative sentence. The semantic effect (though not the syntactic structure) is often similar to a cleft sentence in English:

wa ga ko₁puru ki₁mi₁ so₂ ki₁zo no₂ yo₁ ime₂ ni mi₁-ye-turu
1S GEN love.ADN lord FOC last.night GEN night dream DAT see-PASS-PERF.ADN
'It was my beloved lord that I saw last night in a dream.' (Man'yōshū 2.150)

The particles involved are

- ya, marking the focus of a yes–no question. The particle ya can also be used as a sentence-final marker of a yes–no question, in which case the verb is in the usual conclusive form.
- ka, marking the phrase containing the interrogative word of an open question or the focus of a yes–no question.
- so₂ ~ zo₂, the usual declarative focus marker. By Early Middle Japanese, this had standardized as zo.
- namo₁, soliciting agreement, is rare in poetry but occurs in some prose works. By Early Middle Japanese, it had become namu.
- ko^{2}so^{2}, marking a more emphatic focus. In Early Middle Japanese, this particle occurs with a verb in the exclamatory form.

The focus construction is also common in Classical Japanese, but disappeared after the Early Middle Japanese period. It is still found in Ryukyuan languages, but is much less common there than in Old Japanese.

=== Nominalization ===
The nominal form of a verb, marked with -aku, forms a nominalized clause. The following example has a nominal clause within an adverbial clause marked with the infinitive form:

wa ga ko₂ko₂-da sino₁paku sira-ni poto₂to₂gi₁su idu-pe₁ no yama wo naki₁ ka ko₁yu ramu
1s GEN this-much yearn.NMNL know-NEG.INF cuckoo which-side GEN mountain ACC cry.INF INT cross.CONCL CONJC.ADN
'Not knowing how much I yearn, where will the cuckoo cross the mountains, crying?' (Man'yōshū 19.4195)

The nominal was heavily used in Old Japanese, both with verbs and adjectives, but ceased to be productive in Early Middle Japanese, when its function was taken over by the adnominal.

=== Coordination ===
Coordination is expressed using non-finite verb forms: continuative -(i)tutu 'while', conditional -(a)ba 'if'. provisional -(r)eba 'as' and concessive -(r)edo 'although, even though'.

ato wo mi₁tutu sino₁p-amu tada ni apu madeni
footprint ACC look.CONT yearn.TENT.CONCL real COP.INF meet.ADN TERM.LOC
'looking at [Buddha's] footstep, [I] will yearn [for him], until [I] really meet [him]' (Bussokuseki 6)

By the Late Middle Japanese period, the continuative -(i)tutu was no longer productive and the conditional -(a)ba was in decline.

== Dialects ==
The capital (Nara) and the eastern provinces (hatched) in the 8th century

Although most Old Japanese writing represents the language of the Nara court in central Japan, some sources come from eastern Japan:

- 230 azuma uta 'eastern songs', making up volume 14 of the Man'yōshū,
- 93 (101 according to some authors) sakimori uta 'borderguard songs' in volume 20 of the Man'yōshū, and
- 9 songs in the Hitachi Fudoki (recorded 714–718, but the oldest extant manuscripts date from the late 17th century and show significant corruption).

They record Eastern Old Japanese dialects, with several differences from central Old Japanese (also known as Western Old Japanese):

- There is no type A/B distinction on front vowels i and e, but o₁ and o₂ are distinguished.
- Pre-Old Japanese *ia yielded a in the east, where central Old Japanese has e₁.
- The adnominal form of consonant-base verbs ended in -o₁, whereas central Old Japanese had -u for both the adnominal and the conclusive forms. The modern Hachijō language distinguishes -o and -u in these forms. A similar difference is preserved in Ryukyuan languages, suggesting that central Old Japanese had innovated by merging those endings.
- The adnominal form of adjectives had -ke in place of central Old Japanese -ki₁. This form is also preserved in Hachijō.
- The imperative form of vowel-base verbs attached -ro₂, instead of the -yo₂ used in central Old Japanese. This difference has persisted into modern eastern and western dialects.
- There was a group of distinctive negative auxiliaries -(a)nap- and -(a)nan-, but they do not seem to be the source of the different negatives in the modern eastern and western Japanese dialects.
- There are a significant number of words borrowed from Ainu.

== See also ==
- Classical Japanese language
