= Macro-Yaeyama languages =

Branch of the Southern Ryukyuan languages

Macro-Yaeyama
- Geographic distribution: Yaeyama Islands, Okinawa Prefecture
- Linguistic classification: Japonic: Ryukyuan; Southern Ryukyuan; Macro-Yaeyama
- Subdivisions: Yaeyama; Yonaguni

Language codes
- Glottolog: macr1267

Macro-Yaeyama is one of the two branches of the Southern Ryukyuan languages, comprising the Yaeyama and Yonaguni languages. It is defined by the development of "know" as a potential auxiliary, the semantic extension of "nephew" to being gender-neutral, and unique forms of the words exhibited by the table below.

Macro-Yaeyama Innovations
Region of Speech		'bud'	'dirt'	'fresh'	'happy'
Macro- Yaeyama	Ishigaki	báí	ɡábá	píɾáɡíɕáːŋ	sánìɕàːŋ
Macro- Yaeyama	Taketomi	bəi	ɡə̀bə́	píːɾèsàŋ	sənisəŋ
Macro- Yaeyama	Hatoma	bàì	ɡàbà	pìɾákèːŋ	sàníjàŋ
Macro- Yaeyama	Hateruma	bëː	ɡaba	piɾiːsahaŋ	sḁn̥iɕahaŋ
Macro- Yaeyama	Yonaguni	bai	ɡaba	çiɾaɡjaŋ	ɕànáŋ
Miyako	Ikema	miː	fu̥sɨ	çiɡuɾukai	hu̥kaɾasɨ̥kai
Miyako	Ogami	miː	napa	pukuɾukam	pukaɾaskam
Miyako	Tarama	fukɨ	naba	piɡuɭɭaɭ	pu̥kaɾaɕaːɭ
Amami	Shodon	mɘ̆ː	çîɡ.ɾú	sɨdaɕa	ʔuhoɾaɕa
Okinawa	Nakijin	mìdùɾí	píŋɡù	ɕìdàːɕêŋ	ɸù̥kùɾáɕèŋ

Although Yonaguni has historically been classified as either a primary branch of Ryukyuan or of the Southern Ryukyuan languages, its close relationship with Yaeyama is clear.
