= Warazan =

Ryukyuan record-keeping system

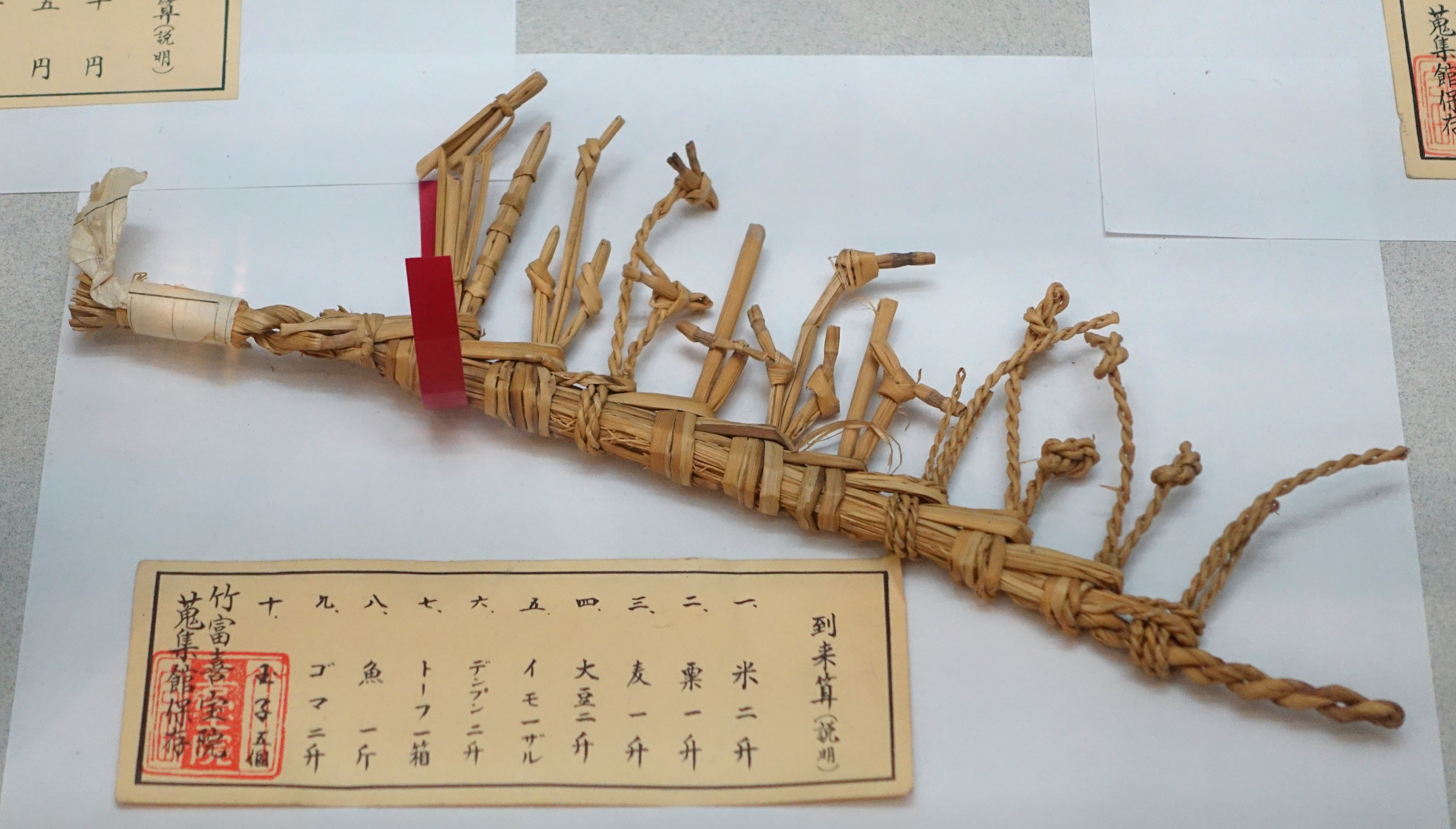
Example of warazan at the Museum of Science, Tokyo University of Science

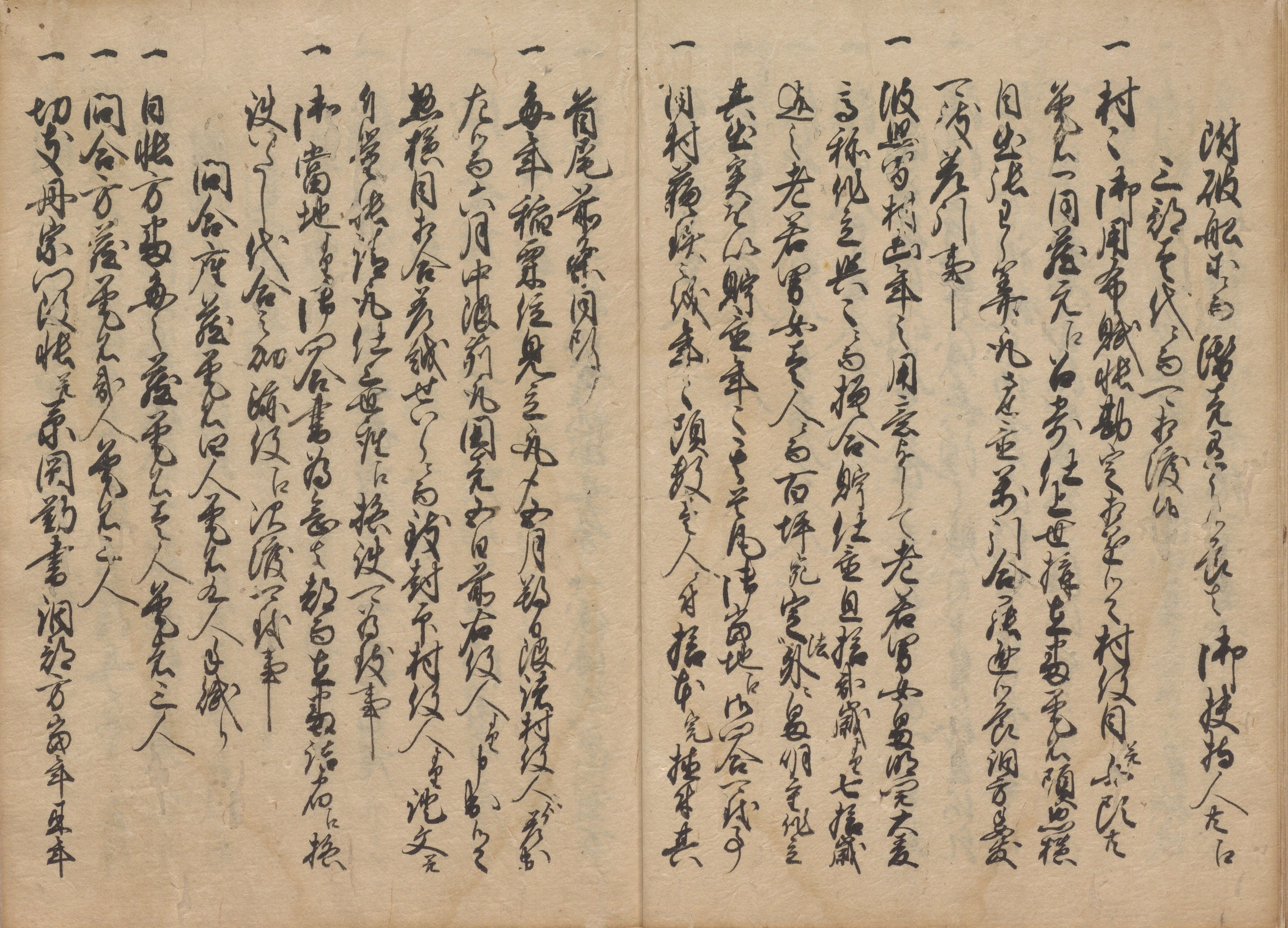
Instruction to use warazan to record the level of tax assessed, in the Yaeyama-jima Kuramoto Kujichō (1873 copy of the 1857 original); the fourth to sixth characters in the fifth line from the right read「わら算」(University of the Ryukyus Library)

Warazan (藁算) was a system of record-keeping using knotted straw at the time of the Ryūkyū Kingdom. In the Southern Ryukyuan languages of the Sakishima Islands it was known as barazan and on Okinawa Island as warazani or warazai. Formerly used in particular in relation to the "head tax", it is still to be found in connection with the annual Itoman Giant Tug-of-War (糸満大綱引), to record the amount of miki or sacred sake dedicated.

== See also ==
- Kaidā glyphs
- Naha Tug-of-war
- Quipu
