= Kayama Island =

Island in Okinawa Prefecture, Japan

Coordinates: 24°21′49″N 123°59′58″E

嘉弥真島
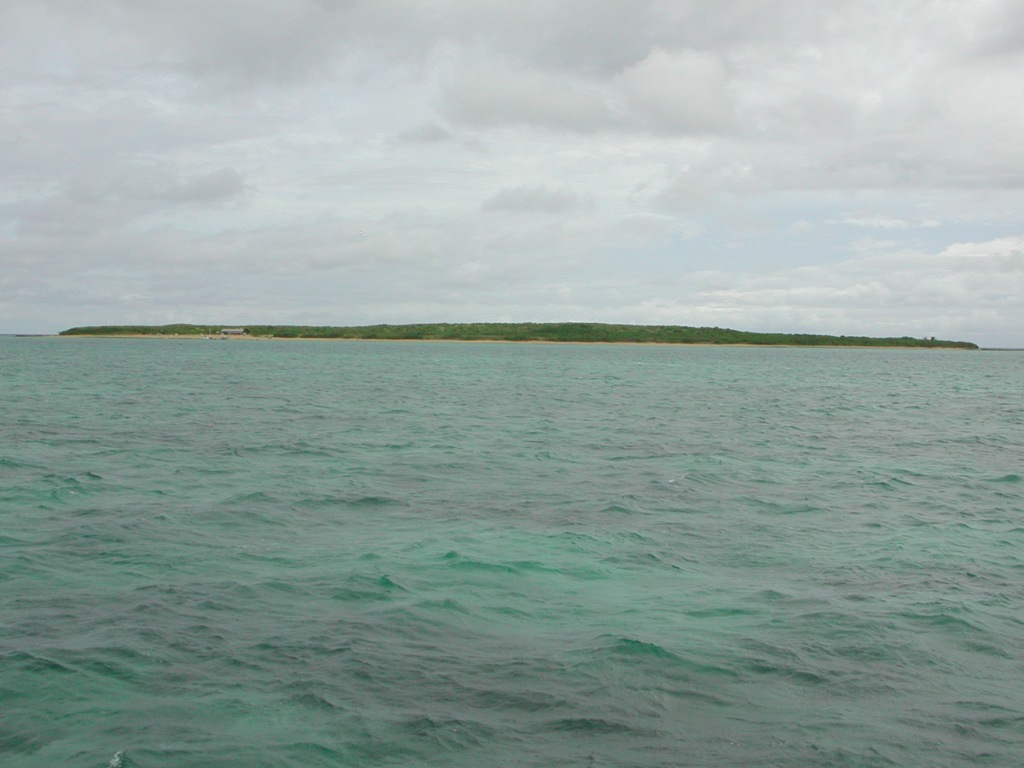
- Interactive map of Kayama Island

Geography
- Location: Yaeyama Islands, Okinawa Prefecture
- Archipelago: Ryukyu Islands
- Area: 0.39 km^{2} (0.15 sq mi)
- Highest point: 62 ft (19 m)

Administration
- Japan

Demographics
- Population: 0 (Uninhabited)

Kayama Island (Japanese: 嘉弥真島, Kayama-jima, Yaeyama: Kayama) is a small uninhabited island located in the Yaeyama Islands of Okinawa Prefecture, Japan. It situated 2 kilometers northeast of Kohama Island.

It is known for its rabbit population, numbering anywhere between 500 and 1,000. Travel agencies offer tours to the island.
