= Kaidā glyphs =

Set of pictograms once used in the Yaeyama Islands of southwestern Japan

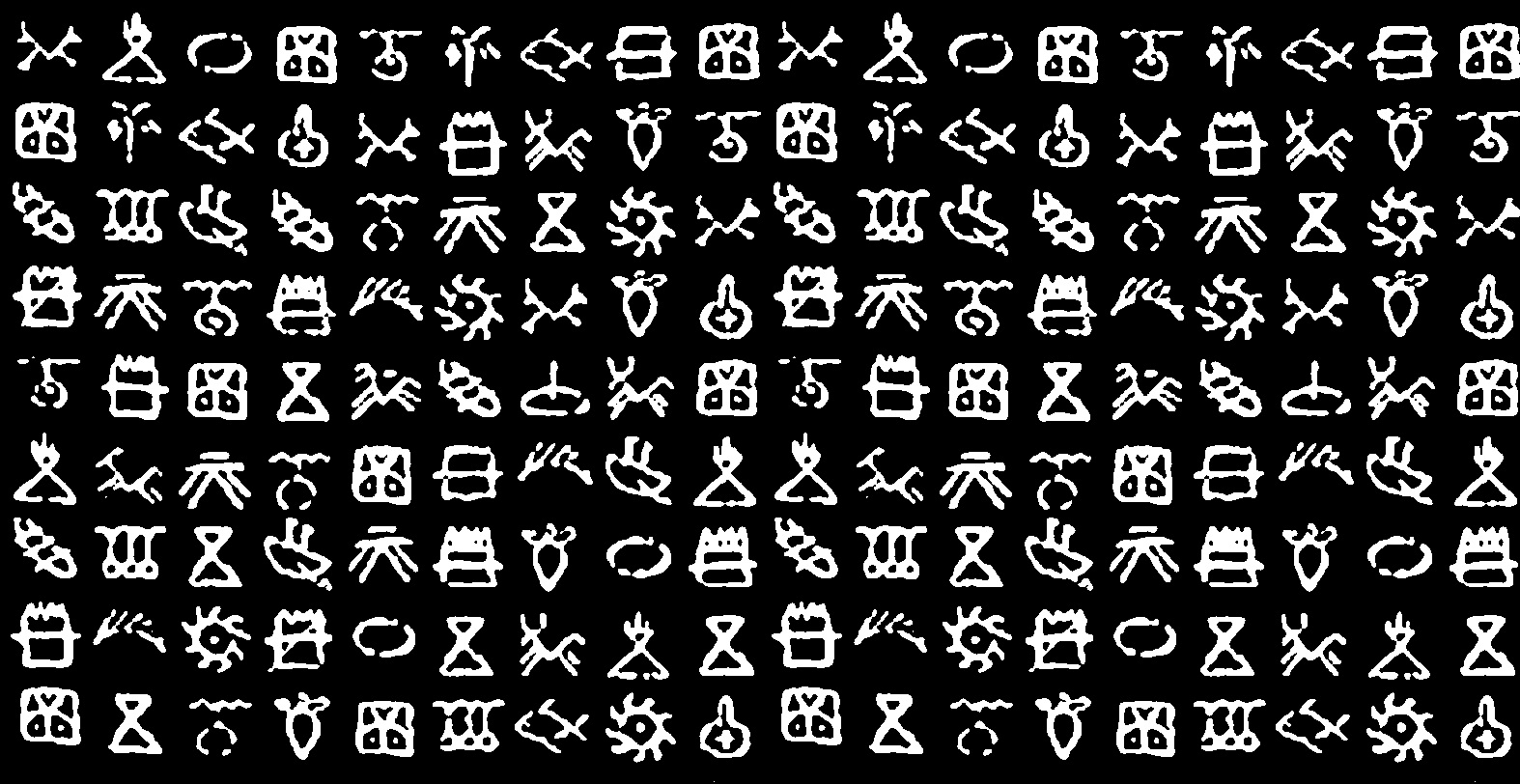
Kaidā glyphs.

Kaidā glyphs (カイダー字, Japanese: Kaidā ji; Yaeyama: Kaidādzī) Yonaguni: Kaidadi, Kaidazu are a set of pictograms once used in the Yaeyama Islands of southwestern Japan. The word kaidā was taken from Yonaguni, and most studies on the pictographs focused on Yonaguni Island. However, there is evidence for their use in Yaeyama's other islands, most notably on Taketomi Island. They were used primarily for tax notices, thus were closely associated with the poll tax imposed on Yaeyama by Ryūkyū on Okinawa Island, which was in turn dominated by Satsuma Domain on Southern Kyushu.

Examples of Kaidā logograms (from Sasamori, 1893)

== Etymology ==
Sudō (1944) hypothesized that the etymology of kaidā was kariya (仮屋), which meant "government office" in Satsuma Domain. This term was borrowed by Ryūkyū on Okinawa and also by the bureaucrats of Yaeyama (karja: in Modern Ishigaki). Japanese /j/ regularly corresponds to /d/ in Yonaguni, and /r/ is often dropped when surrounded by vowels. This theory is in line with the primary impetus for Kaidā glyphs, taxation.

== History ==
Immediately after conquering Ryūkyū, Satsuma conducted a land survey in Okinawa in 1609 and in Yaeyama in 1611. By doing so, Satsuma decided the amount of tribute to be paid annually by Ryūkyū. Following that, Ryūkyū imposed a poll tax on Yaeyama in 1640. A fixed quota was allocated to each island and then was broken up into each community. Finally, quotas were set for the individual islanders, adjusted only by age and gender. Community leaders were notified of quotas in the government office on Ishigaki. They checked the calculation using warazan (barazan in Yaeyama), a straw-based method of calculation and recording numerals that was reminiscent of Incan Quipu. After that, the quota for each household was written on a wooden plate called itafuda or hansatsu (板札). That was where Kaidā glyphs were used. Although sōrō-style written Japanese had the status of administrative language, the remote islands had to rely on pictograms to notify illiterate peasants. According to a 19th-century document cited by the Yaeyama rekishi (1954), an official named Ōhama Seiki designed "perfect ideographs" for itafuda in the early 19th century although it suggests the existence of earlier, "imperfect" ideographs. Sudō (1944) recorded an oral history on Yonaguni: 9 generations ago, an ancestor of the Kedagusuku lineage named Mase taught Kaidā glyphs and warazan to the public. Sudō dated the event to the second half of the 17th century.

According to Ikema (1959), Kaidā glyphs and warazan were evidently accurate enough to make corrections to official announcements. The poll tax was finally abolished in 1903. They were used until the introduction of the nationwide primary education system rapidly lowered the illiteracy rate during the Meiji period. They are currently used on Yonaguni and Taketomi for folk art, T-shirts, and other products, more for their artistic value than as a record-keeping system.

== Repertoire ==
Kaidā glyphs consist of

- references to animals, plants and their byproducts, such as rice, millet, bean, bull, sheep, goat, fish and textile, and
- numerals, or basic units, such as a bag of rice (俵), a bag of millet, a dipper of rice (斗), a box of rice (升), half a bag of rice, and
- household symbols called dāhan.

As for numerals, similar systems called sūchūma can be found in Okinawa and Miyako and appear to have their roots in the Suzhou numerals.

== Research history ==
The first non-Yaeyama author to comment on kaidā glyphs was Gisuke Sasamori, who left copies of many short kaidā texts in his Nantō Tanken (南島探検, Exploration of the Southern Islands), a record of his 1893 visit to Okinawa Prefecture which also mentions the hard labor imposed on the islanders by the regime. Yasusada Tashiro collected various numeral systems found in Okinawa and Miyako and donated them to the Tokyo National Museum in 1887. A paper on sūchūma by British Japanologist Basil Chamberlain (1898) appears to have been based on Tashiro's collection.

In 1915 the mathematics teacher Kiichi Yamuro (矢袋喜一) included many more examples of kaidā glyphs, barazan knotted counting ropes, and local number words (along with a reproduction of Sasamori's records) in his book on Old Ryukyuan Mathematics (琉球古来の数学). Although Yamuro did not visit Yonaguni by himself, his records suggest that kaidā glyphs were still in daily use in the 1880s. Anthropologist Tadao Kawamura, who made his anthropological study of the islands in the 1930s, noted "they were in use until recently." He showed how kaidā glyphs were used in sending packages. Sudō (1944) showed how business transactions were recorded on leaves using kaidā glyphs. He also proposed an etymology for kaidā.

== See also ==
- Writing in the Ryukyu Kingdom
