= Leptogomphus yayeyamensis =

Conservation status
- Least Concern (IUCN 3.1)

Scientific classification
- Kingdom: Animalia
- Phylum: Arthropoda
- Class: Insecta
- Order: Odonata
- Infraorder: Anisoptera
- Family: Gomphidae
- Genus: Leptogomphus
- Species: L. yayeyamensis

Binomial name
- Leptogomphus yayeyamensis Matsumura, 1926

Species of dragonfly

Leptogomphus yayeyamensis is a species of dragonfly in the family Gomphidae. It is endemic to the Yaeyama Islands, in the southwest the Ryukyu Islands, Japan. It is locally common and found in mountain-hill streams with sandy bottom.

The length of the abdomen is 34–35 mm (1.3–1.4 in) in males and 35–37 mm (1.4–1.5 in) in females.
