= Naata =

Naata may refer to:

- Naata (film)
- National Asian American Telecommunications Association (NAATA), former name for the Center for Asian American Media
- Naata Nungurrayi, Austrialian aboriginal artist
- Naata Ufushu, Ryukyuan local chief
