= Sotobanari =

Island in Okinawa, Japan

Coordinates: 24°22′23″N 123°42′58″E

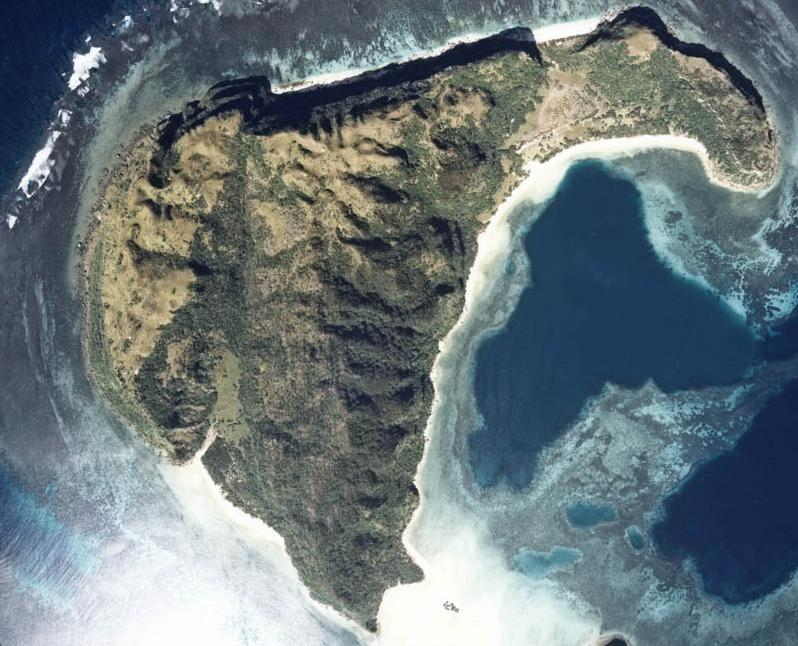
Sotobanari

Sotobanari Island (外離島, Sotobanari-jima; Yaeyama: Fukabanari; Okinawan: Fukabanari) is one of the Yaeyama Islands, within the Sakishima Islands, at the southern end of the Ryukyu Islands. It is to the west of Iriomote Island, its nearest large neighbour. It is administered as part of the town of Taketomi, Okinawa Prefecture, Japan. The small island (about 1 km; 1000 yards in diameter), whose name means outer distant island, is vegetated, but has no running water.

== Hermit inhabitant ==
Sotobanari had one human inhabitant, a man named Masafumi Nagasaki, who had lived there in semi-isolation for three decades (1989-2018), nude, and bought food and water from a settlement an hour away by boat weekly with ¥10,000 sent by family. He was featured on the VICE News segment "Japan's Naked Island Hermit". In April 2018, the police forced Nagasaki to leave the island, as he became weak with age and had contracted an illness (suspected influenza). The Japanese government provided him with a bedroom and a small allowance. In 2022, Japanese authorities allowed Nagasaki travel to the island again, but he returned back to civilisation after visiting for only a few days with a documentary filmmaker, as he was too weak to sustain a life on the island.

== See also ==
- List of islands of Japan
