= Aragusuku dialect =

Aragusuku dialect may refer to:

- The Aragusuku dialect of the Miyakoan language, spoken on Miyako Island
- The Aragusuku dialect of the Yaeyama language, spoken in the Aragusuku Islands
