= Arisaka (surname) =

Arisaka (有坂) is a Japanese surname. Notable people with the surname include:

- Hideyo Arisaka (有坂 秀世, 1908–1952), Japanese linguist
- Mika Arisaka (有坂 美香, born 1974), Japanese-American singer
- Arisaka Nariakira (有坂 成章, 1852–1915), Japanese general
