= Suda Hachiman Shrine Mirror =

- 隅田八幡神社人物画像鏡 (Japanese)
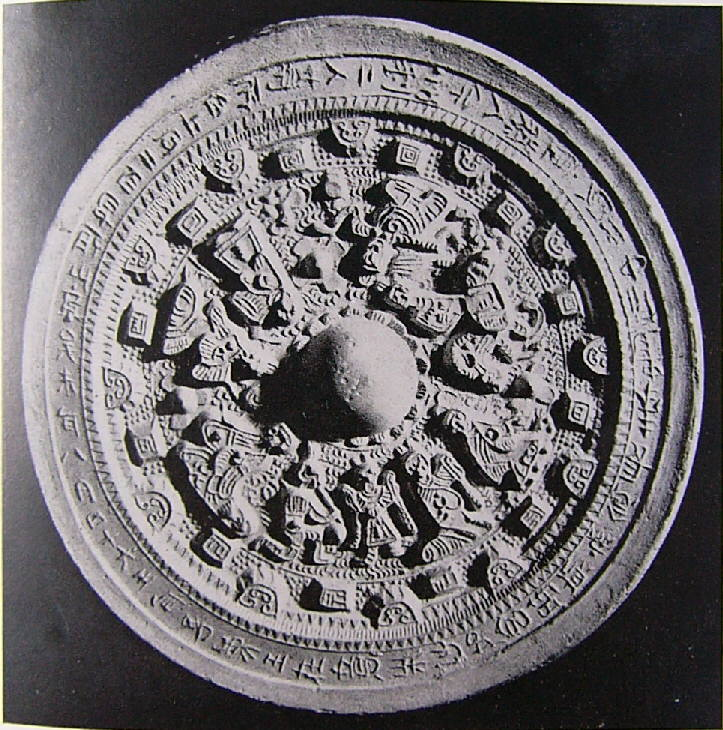
- Bronze mirror of Suda Hachiman Shrine
- Interactive map of Suda Hachiman Shrine Mirror
- Location: Hashimoto, Wakayama, Japan

National Treasure of Japan

The Suda Hachiman Shrine Mirror (Japanese: 隅田八幡神社人物画像鏡, Hepburn: Suda Hachiman Jinja Jinbutsu Gazō-kyō) in Hashimoto, Wakayama, Japan is a National Treasure of Japan. It is a bronze mirror cast with 48 Chinese characters around the fifth century. It is an important artifact for the research in Japanese archaeology and Old Japanese language. It was found at Suda Hachiman Shrine, and its earliest mention in text is in the 3rd volume of the Kii no kuni meisho zue (紀伊国名所図会; "Illustrated Guide to Places of Note in Kii Province") published in 1838.

== Inscriptions ==
The mirror says

癸未年八月日十大王年男弟王在意柴沙加宮時斯麻念長寿遣開中費直穢人今州利二人等取白上同二百旱作此竟

There are a few unclear points, but a tentative translation is "In the eighth month of a gui-wei year, in the reign of the great king, when the prince Wooto was at the Osisaka Palace, Sima, wishing for longevity, sent two persons to make this mirror from 200 han of brand-new and fine bronze." The year gui-wei likely corresponds to 443 or 503.

According to one prevailing opinion, the prince Wooto can be identified as the prince Oohodo, a grandson of Emperor Ōjin and a brother of Oshisaka-no-Oonakatsuhime (Emperor Ingyō's consort). Another theory holds that Wooto is Ōdo-no-Ookimi (Emperor Keitai). He may be a great-grandson (or a younger brother) of the prince Oohodo. If the gui-wei year corresponds to 503, Shima is presumed King Muryeong of Baekje, whose name is recorded on his tomb as 斯摩: pronounced Sama in Korean, and Shima in Japanese.

On the basis of this ancient inscription, Korean scholar Kim Woon-Hoe theorizes a fraternal relationship between Emperor Keitai of Japan and King Muryeong of Baekje. A mirror was excavated from the tomb of King Muryeong. It is similar to the mirrors of Emperor Nintoku and Emperor Keitai. In the ancient Buyeo kingdom, the bronze mirror represented the king.

== Earliest record ==
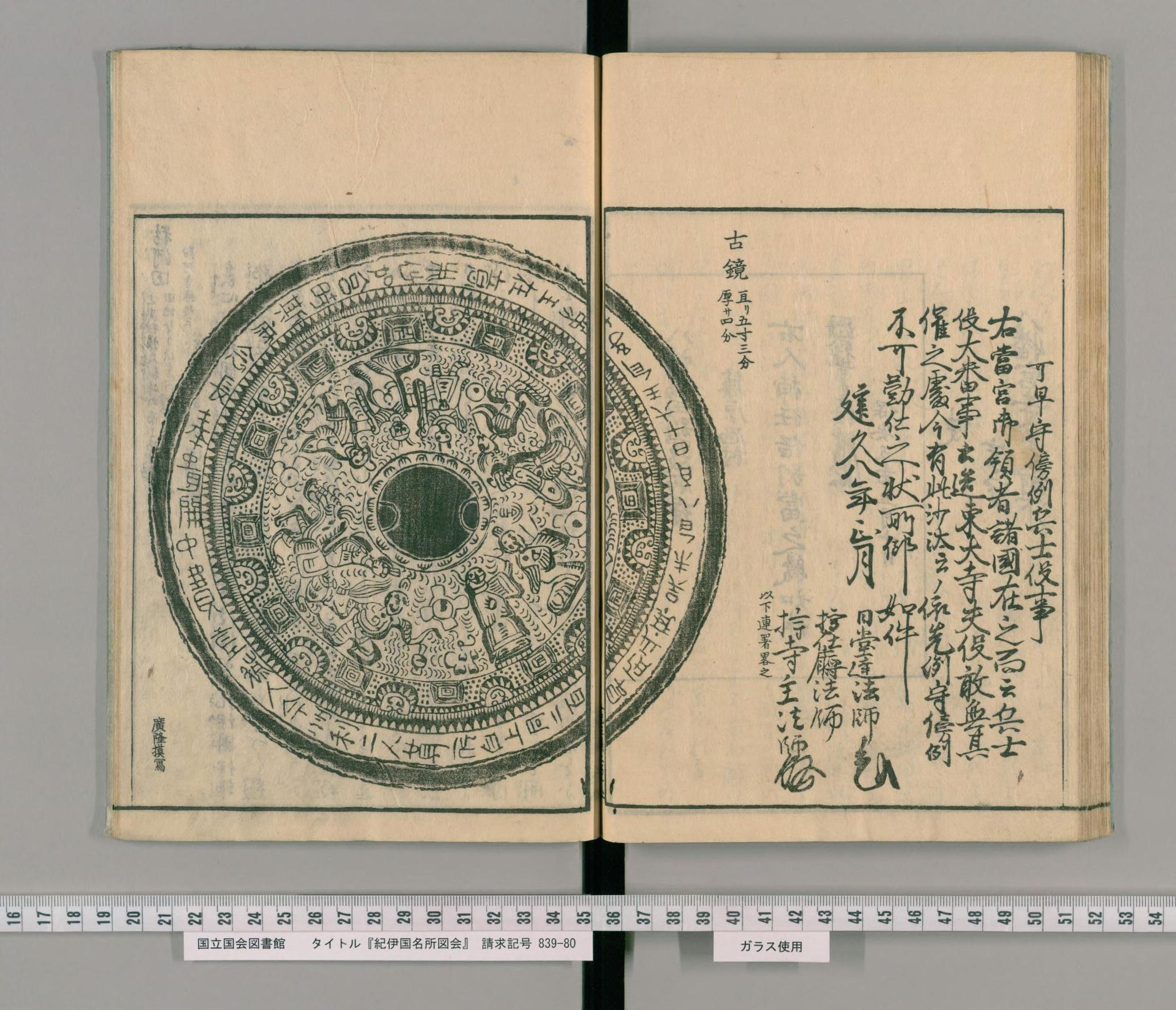
Ink painting of the Suda Hachiman Shrine mirror as depicted in the Kii no kuni meisho zue

The earliest record of this mirror is from the 3rd volume of the Kii no kuni meisho zue published in 1838. According to this text, the mirror had been passed down and treasured at the Suda Hachiman shrine. The monks of the shrine told the traditional account of this mirror's history. This account states that this mirror was presented to Empress Jingū, after her conquest of the Samhan confederacies of Korea by "the people of that land". Although there is doubt that her invasion of Korea was a historical event. The text mentions other theories for the historical origin of the mirror, and it makes an attempt to date the artifact by analysing the script used for the inscription. The text also contains an ink painting of the mirror.

== See also ==
- Seven-Branched Sword
