= Leptogomphus =

Scientific classification
- Kingdom: Animalia
- Phylum: Arthropoda
- Class: Insecta
- Order: Odonata
- Infraorder: Anisoptera
- Family: Gomphidae
- Genus: Leptogomphus; Selys, 1878

Genus of dragonflies

Leptogomphus is a genus of dragonfly in the family Gomphidae.

== Species ==
There are 24 recognized species:

- Leptogomphus baolocensis Karube, 2001
- Leptogomphus celebratus Chao, 1982
- Leptogomphus coomansi Laidlaw, 1936
- Leptogomphus divaricatus Chao, 1984
- Leptogomphus elegans Lieftinck 1948
- Leptogomphus gestroi Selys, 1891
- Leptogomphus hongkongensis Asahina, 1988
- Leptogomphus inclitus Selys, 1878
- Leptogomphus inouei Karube, 2014
- Leptogomphus intermedius Chao, 1982
- Leptogomphus palawanus Asahina, 1968
- Leptogomphus pasia van Tol, 1990
- Leptogomphus pendleburyi Laidlaw, 1934
- Leptogomphus perforatus Ris, 1912
- Leptogomphus risi Laidlaw, 1932
- Leptogomphus sauteri Ris, 1912
- Leptogomphus schieli Dow, Stokvis & Ngiam, 2017
- Leptogomphus semperi Selys, 1878
- Leptogomphus sii Dow, Stokvis & Ngiam, 2017
- Leptogomphus tamdaoensis Karube, 2014
- Leptogomphus tioman Choong, 2016
- Leptogomphus uenoi Asahina, 1996
- Leptogomphus williamsoni Laidlaw, 1912
- Leptogomphus yayeyamensis Matsumura in Oguma, 1926
