= Shinkichi Hashimoto =

Japanese linguist

- 橋本 進吉
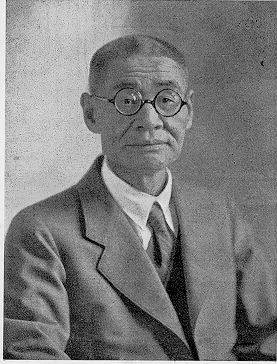
- Born: December 24, 1882; Fukui City, Japan
- Died: January 30, 1945 (aged 62)
- Occupation: linguist

Shinkichi Hashimoto (橋本 進吉, Hashimoto Shinkichi; December 24, 1882 – January 30, 1945) was a Japanese linguist, born in Tsuruga, Fukui Prefecture, Japan.

== Biography ==
Hashimoto is especially noted for the discovery of Jōdai Tokushu Kanazukai, which makes it clear that Old Japanese made more syllabic distinctions than later periods of the language. This discovery led him to hypothesize that Old Japanese had eight vowels, while modern Japanese has only five. His systematic description of the Japanese grammar also laid the foundations of language education for Japanese children.

== See also ==
- Japanese literature
- List of Japanese authors
