= Naata Ufushu =

Ryukyuan chief

Naata Ufushu (長田大主; Yaeyama: Nāta Fūju; 1456-1517) was a Ryukyuan local chief who supported the forces of the Ryūkyū Kingdom in suppressing the rebellion of Oyake Akahachi, another regional chieftain.

== Life ==
Naata was born on Hateruma Island and traveled to Ishigaki Island at the age of eight. Over the years, as he grew, he gained power, eventually uniting Ishigaki Village and becoming its head.

He was approached, as were a number of other local chieftains, by Oyake Akahachi, who sought to have them join him in rebellion against the Ryūkyū Kingdom. Naata is said to have been quite loyal to the king, and sought to appease Akahachi by offering him his younger sister Koitsuba's hand in marriage; this failed, and Akahachi escaped to Iriomote Island with Koitsuba and her two younger brothers.

Akahachi was defeated in the end by royal forces, with Naata's support.

== Genealogical claims ==
It is sometimes said that Naata was the son of Nakasone Toyomiya, or otherwise descended from him, but this seems unlikely, as Nakasone is known to have lived sometime around 1500–1530, which would make him younger or contemporaneous with Naata, not old enough to be his father or other ancestor.
