= Hideyo Arisaka =

Japanese linguist (1908-1952)

- Born: September 5, 1908; Kure, Hiroshima, Japan
- Died: March 13, 1952 (aged 43)
- Other name: 有坂 秀世

Academic background
- Education: Tokyo Imperial University

Academic work
- Discipline: linguistics

Hideyo Arisaka (有坂 秀世, Arisaka Hideyo; September 5, 1908 - March 13, 1952) was a Japanese linguist.

== Biography ==
Arisaka was born in Kure, Hiroshima, and graduated from the Tokyo Imperial University in 1931. He specialized in Historical Japanese phonology and Historical Chinese phonology, making important contributions to the studies of Jōdai Tokushu Kanazukai and Middle Chinese.
