= Southern Ryukyuan languages =

Branch of the Ryukyuan language family

Southern Ryukyuan
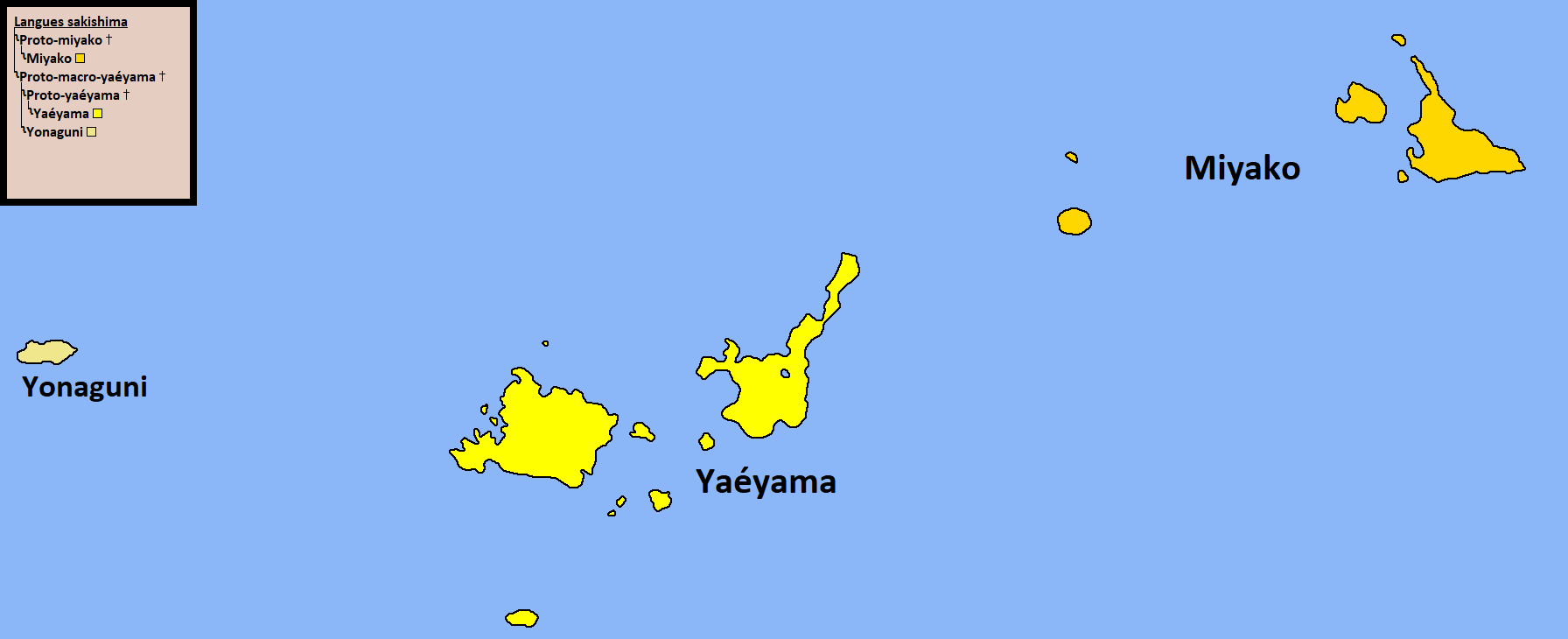
- Geographic distribution: Sakishima Islands, Okinawa Prefecture
- Linguistic classification: Japonic: Ryukyuan; Southern Ryukyuan
- Proto-language: Proto-Sakishima
- Subdivisions: Miyakoan; Macro-Yaeyama

Language codes
- Glottolog: ryuk1244

The Southern Ryukyuan languages (南琉球語群, Minami Ryūkyū gogun) form one of two branches of the Ryukyuan languages. They are spoken on the Sakishima Islands in Okinawa Prefecture. The three languages are Miyako (on the Miyako Islands) and Yaeyama and Yonaguni (on the Yaeyama Islands, of the Macro-Yaeyama subgroup). The Macro-Yaeyama languages have been identified as "critically endangered" by UNESCO and Miyako as "definitely endangered".

All Ryukyuan languages are officially labeled as dialects of Japanese by the Japanese government despite mutual unintelligibility. While the majority of Ryukyuan languages have used Chinese or Japanese script for writing, the Yaeyama Islands never had a full-featured writing system. Islanders developed the Kaidā glyphs as a simple method to record family names, items, and numerals to aid in tax accounting. This system was used until the 19th century introduction of Japanese-language education. Even today, communication in the Yaeyama or Yonaguni languages is almost exclusively oral, and written communication is done in Japanese.

== Reconstruction ==
Proto-Sakishima, the proto-language ancestral to the Southern Ryukyuan languages, has been reconstructed by Bentley (2008).
