= Hateruma =

Island within Ryukyu Islands

Coordinates: 24°04′N 123°47′E

Hateruma 波照間島
Native name: Yaeyama: Patirooma Okinawan: Hatiruma Japanese: Hateruma-jima
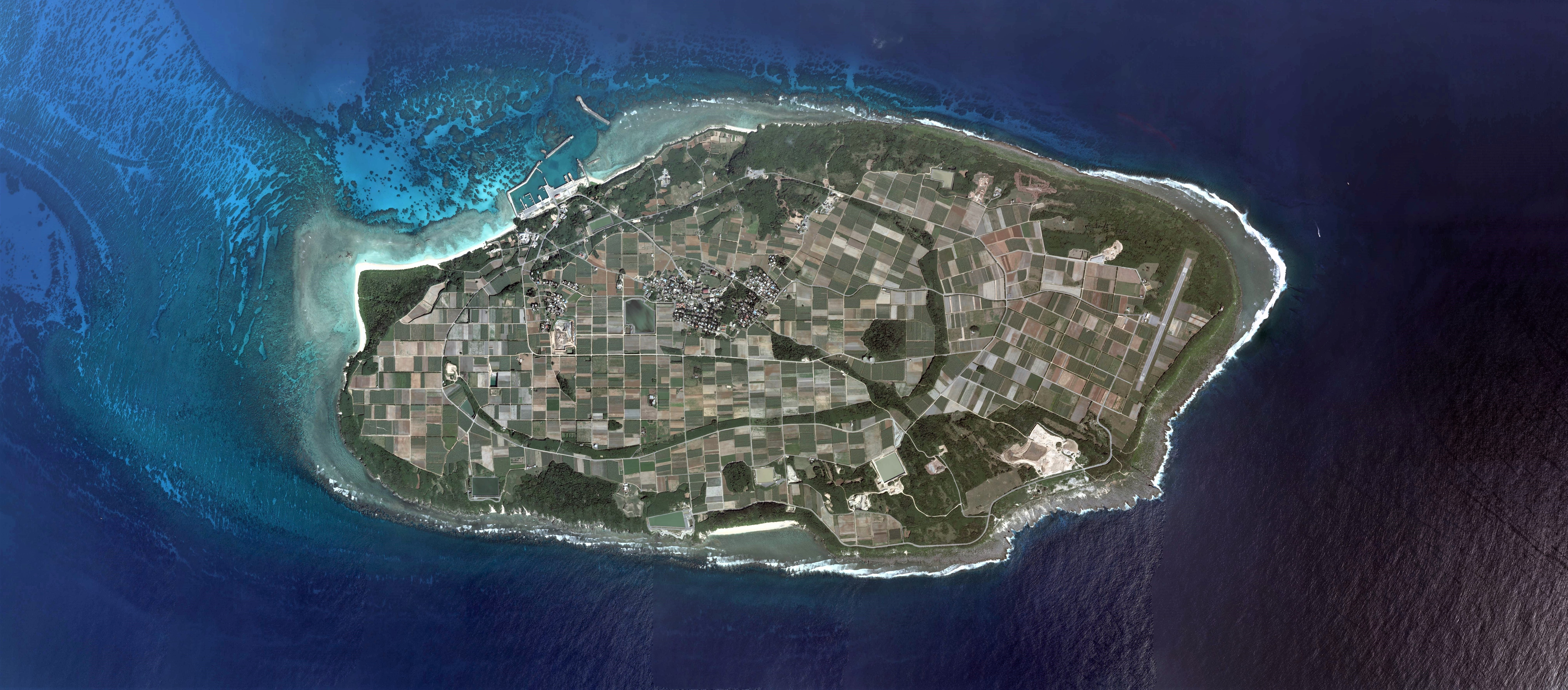
- Aerial view of Hateruma

Geography
- Archipelago: Yaeyama Islands
- Adjacent to: Pacific Ocean
- Area: 12.7 km^{2} (4.9 sq mi)
- Coastline: 14.8 km (9.2 mi)
- Highest elevation: 59.5 m (195.2 ft)

Administration
- Japan
- Prefectures: Okinawa Prefecture
- District: Yaeyama
- Town: Taketomi

Demographics
- Ethnic groups: Ryukyuan, Japanese

Hateruma (波照間島; Yaeyama: Patirooma, Hateruma dialect: Besїma "our island", Okinawan: Hatiruma, Northern Ryukyuan: ぱたら Patara, Japanese:Hateruma-jima) is an island in the Yaeyama District of Okinawa Prefecture, Japan. It is the southernmost inhabited island in Japan. It is one of the Yaeyama Islands, and is located 24 kilometres (15 mi) south of Iriomote-jima, the largest of the island group.

Hateruma, which is composed of corals, has 12.7 km^{2} (4.9 mi^{2}) of area and approximately 600 inhabitants. The primary products of the island include sugarcane, pineapple, refined sugar, and Awanami, a type of the alcoholic beverage awamori. Its southern location makes it one of the few places in Japan where the Southern Cross can be observed.

== Tourism ==
Hateruma is frequently visited by tourists from Ishigaki on day trips, as it boasts the southernmost tip of land of Japan. In addition, the southernmost school and the southernmost police station of Japan are tourist attractions. In the only village, several well-preserved old houses showing the traditional architecture with a hip roof, red tiles and a shisa statue on the top can be seen. Many old houses are still surrounded by a thick wall consisting of dark coral stones. On the south coast, there is a monument indicating the southernmost tip of land of Japan.

== Climate ==
Hateruma has a tropical rainforest climate (Af according to the Köppen climate classification), because all twelve months have a mean temperature of at least 18 °C (64 °F). The temperature is consistently warm year-round, with January, the coolest month, having a mean of 19.0 °C (66.2 °F) and an average low of 17.0 °C (62.6 °F). July is the warmest month, with a mean of 29.1 °C (84.4 °F) and an average high of 32.2 °C (90.0 °F). The highest temperature ever recorded was 35.7 °C (96.3 °F) in August and the lowest recorded temperature was 7.8 °C (46.0 °F) in March.

Hateruma receives 1,744.5 millimetres (68.68 in) of precipitation annually. Precipitation is abundant year-round, with every month receiving at least 100 millimetres (3.9 in) of rain. Typhoons often bring heavy rain, so Hateruma receives more precipitation at the peak of the typhoon season. September is the wettest month, receiving 214.6 millimetres (8.45 in) of rain on average. February is the driest month, receiving 101.4 millimetres (3.99 in) of rainfall. There are a similar amount of precipitation days each month, with April having the least with 8.3 and January having the most with 11.6 days. Hateruma receives 1965.8 hours of sunshine annually, with summer being the sunniest season and winter being the least sunny season.

Climate data for Hateruma (1991−2020 normals, extremes 1979−present)
Month	Jan	Feb	Mar	Apr	May	Jun	Jul	Aug	Sep	Oct	Nov	Dec	Year
Record high °C (°F)	27.7 (81.9)	28.5 (83.3)	29.6 (85.3)	31.3 (88.3)	34.0 (93.2)	34.7 (94.5)	35.4 (95.7)	35.7 (96.3)	35.0 (95.0)	32.6 (90.7)	30.7 (87.3)	29.7 (85.5)	35.7 (96.3)
Mean daily maximum °C (°F)	21.5 (70.7)	22.1 (71.8)	23.8 (74.8)	26.1 (79.0)	28.6 (83.5)	31.0 (87.8)	32.2 (90.0)	31.9 (89.4)	30.7 (87.3)	28.4 (83.1)	26.0 (78.8)	22.9 (73.2)	27.1 (80.8)
Daily mean °C (°F)	19.0 (66.2)	19.5 (67.1)	20.9 (69.6)	23.2 (73.8)	25.7 (78.3)	28.1 (82.6)	29.1 (84.4)	28.8 (83.8)	27.7 (81.9)	25.7 (78.3)	23.5 (74.3)	20.5 (68.9)	24.3 (75.8)
Mean daily minimum °C (°F)	17.0 (62.6)	17.4 (63.3)	18.7 (65.7)	21.0 (69.8)	23.5 (74.3)	26.0 (78.8)	26.8 (80.2)	26.5 (79.7)	25.5 (77.9)	23.9 (75.0)	21.7 (71.1)	18.7 (65.7)	22.2 (72.0)
Record low °C (°F)	8.0 (46.4)	10.4 (50.7)	7.8 (46.0)	13.0 (55.4)	16.7 (62.1)	17.8 (64.0)	22.0 (71.6)	22.5 (72.5)	20.2 (68.4)	15.6 (60.1)	14.3 (57.7)	10.3 (50.5)	7.8 (46.0)
Average precipitation mm (inches)	119.6 (4.71)	101.4 (3.99)	114.9 (4.52)	131.7 (5.19)	170.5 (6.71)	147.7 (5.81)	112.8 (4.44)	180.0 (7.09)	214.6 (8.45)	162.6 (6.40)	147.2 (5.80)	128.0 (5.04)	1,744.5 (68.68)
Average precipitation days (≥ 1.0 mm)	11.6	9.4	9.5	8.3	9.4	9.2	9.1	11.0	10.9	9.7	10.3	11.5	119.9
Mean monthly sunshine hours	94.3	97.8	128.1	143.8	174.9	221.4	261.2	238.5	199.1	179.7	127.3	99.8	1,965.8
Source: JMA

== Infrastructure ==
Hateruma Airport is located on the island, but is not currently served by any commercial flights. Haterujima is accessible by ferry from Ishigaki several times a day.

== Education ==
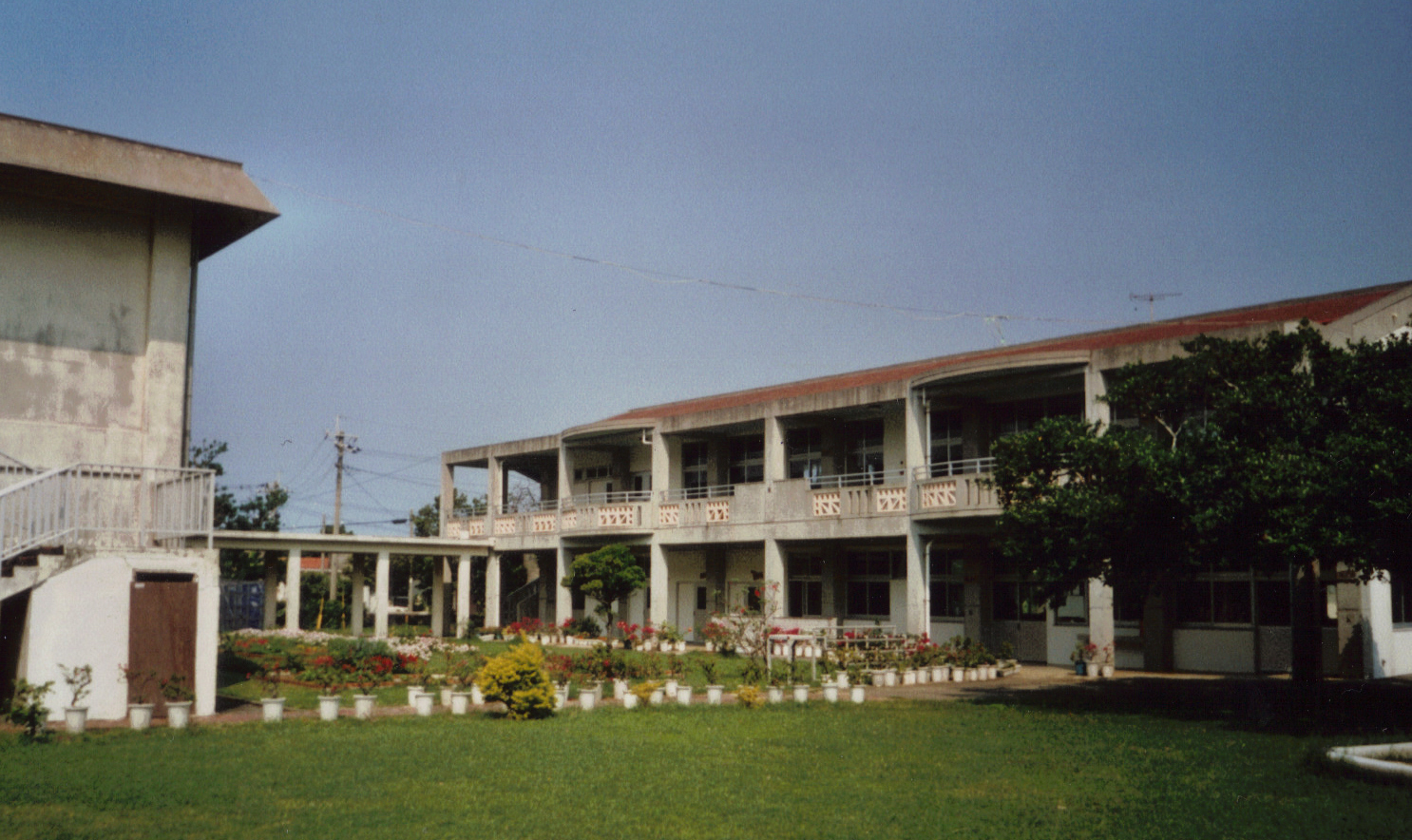
Hateruma Elementary and Junior High School (竹富町立波照間小中学校), southernmost school of Japan

The Taketomi town authorities maintain a single combined elementary and junior high school on the island: Hateruma Elementary and Junior High School (竹富町立波照間小中学校).

For public senior high school students may attend schools of the Okinawa Prefectural Board of Education.

== Notable people ==
- Naata Ufushu (1456–1517) – chieftain

== See also ==
- Geography of Japan
- Japanese archipelago
- List of extreme points of Japan
- Okinotorishima
- Paipatirōma-jima

== Bibliography ==
- Yamakei: Ryukyu Nansei Shoto, p. 120-121. Tokio 2003. ISBN 4-635-01718-4
