= Yaeyama Islands =

Archipelago within the Ryukyu Islands

Native name: Yaeyama-rettō (八重山列島)
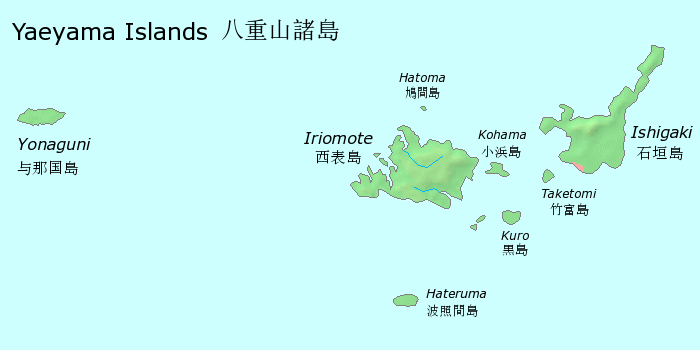
- Map of the Yaeyama Islands

- Location within Japan

Geography
- Location: Pacific Ocean
- Coordinates: 24°21′47″N 123°44′47″E
- Archipelago: Sakishima Islands
- Adjacent to: East China Sea
- Total islands: 23
- Major islands: Ishigaki Island, Iriomote Island, Yonaguni Island
- Area: 587.16 km^{2} (226.70 sq mi)
- Highest elevation: 525.5 m (1724.1 ft)
- Highest point: Mount Omoto

Administration
- Japan
- Prefecture: Okinawa Prefecture

Demographics
- Population: 53,627 (March 31, 2011)
- Pop. density: 91/km^{2} (236/sq mi)
- Ethnic groups: Ryukyuans, Japanese

The Yaeyama Islands (八重山列島 Yaeyama-rettō, also 八重山諸島 Yaeyama-shotō, Yaeyama: Yaima, Yonaguni: Daama, Okinawan: Yeema, Northern Ryukyuan: やへま Yapema) are an archipelago in the southwest of Okinawa Prefecture, Japan, and cover 591.46 square kilometres (228.36 mi^{2}). The islands are located southwest of the Miyako Islands, part of the Ryukyu Islands archipelago. The Yaeyama Islands are the most remote part of Japan from the main islands and contain Japan's southernmost (Hateruma) and westernmost (Yonaguni) inhabited islands. The city of Ishigaki serves as the political, cultural, and economic center of the Yaeyama Islands. On maps dating to the 1700s, the Yaeyama Group of Islands appears as the "Majico Sima Group", "Nambu-soto Islands", "Nambu Soto", and the "Taipin Islands".

== Name ==
The name Yaeyama literally means "multilayered mountains", and is related to the native name Yaima in Yaeyama, which possibly comes from a reconstructed Proto-Ryukyuan form *jajama (pronounced *yayama with tone class A).

== Natural history ==
The Yaeyama Islands are home to numerous species of subtropical and tropical plants and mangrove forests. The islands produce sugarcane and pineapples.

Coral reefs around the islands are ideal habitats for dolphins, sea turtles, and larger fish such as manta rays and whale sharks. Before being wiped out by humans, whales and dugongs were common as well, and Yaeyama once had the largest population of dugongs in the Ryukyu Islands. On Aragusuku Island, there is an utaki or sacred place that specially enshrines hunted dugongs with their skulls, but non-residents are not permitted to enter unless they receive special permission from inhabitants, and it is said that anyone without permission will be driven out by force.

The islands have been recognised as an Important Bird Area (IBA) by BirdLife International because they support populations of resident black wood pigeons and Ryukyu green pigeons, wintering ruddy turnstones, migrating grey-tailed tattlers, and breeding colonies of bridled, roseate and black-naped terns.

Satakentia liukiuensis, the Yaeyama palm, is only species in the genus Satakentia, is endemic to the two islands of Ishigaki and Iriomote in the Yaeyama Islands.

== Geography ==
The islands form the southern part of the volcanic Ryukyu Islands. The administrative division of Yaeyama District covers all of the Yaeyama Islands, except Ishigaki and the disputed Senkaku Islands.

=== Inhabited islands ===
- Ishigaki City
  - Ishigaki Island (Ishigaki-jima)
- Taketomi Town (Yaeyama District)
  - Aragusuku Island (Aragusuku-jima)
  - Hateruma Island (Hateruma-jima)
  - Iriomote Island (Iriomote-jima)
  - Kayama Island (Kayama-jima)
  - Kohama Island (Kohama-jima)
  - Kuroshima Island (Kuroshima)
  - Sotobanari Island (Sotobanari-jima) (officially uninhabited)
  - Taketomi Island (Taketomi-jima)
  - Yubu Island (Yubu-jima)
  - Hatoma Island (Hatoma-jima)
- Yonaguni Town (Yaeyama District)
  - Yonaguni Island (Yonaguni-jima)
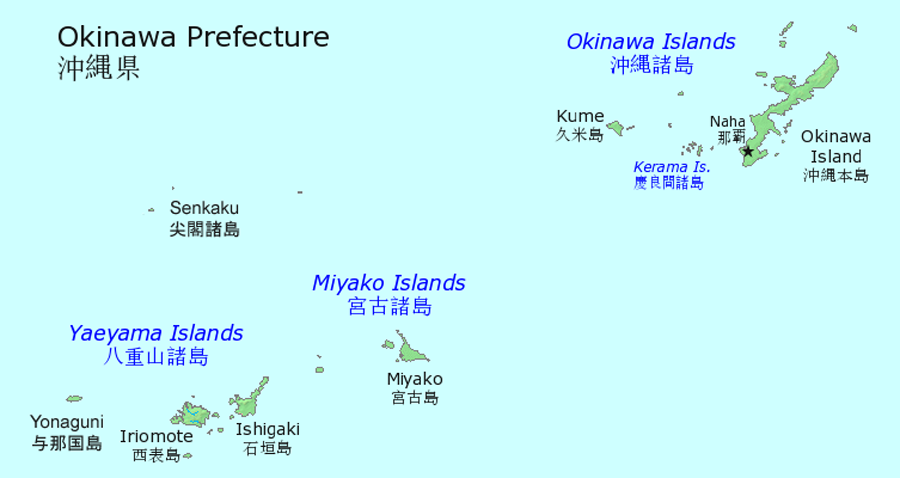
Location of the Yaeyama Islands in Okinawa Prefecture

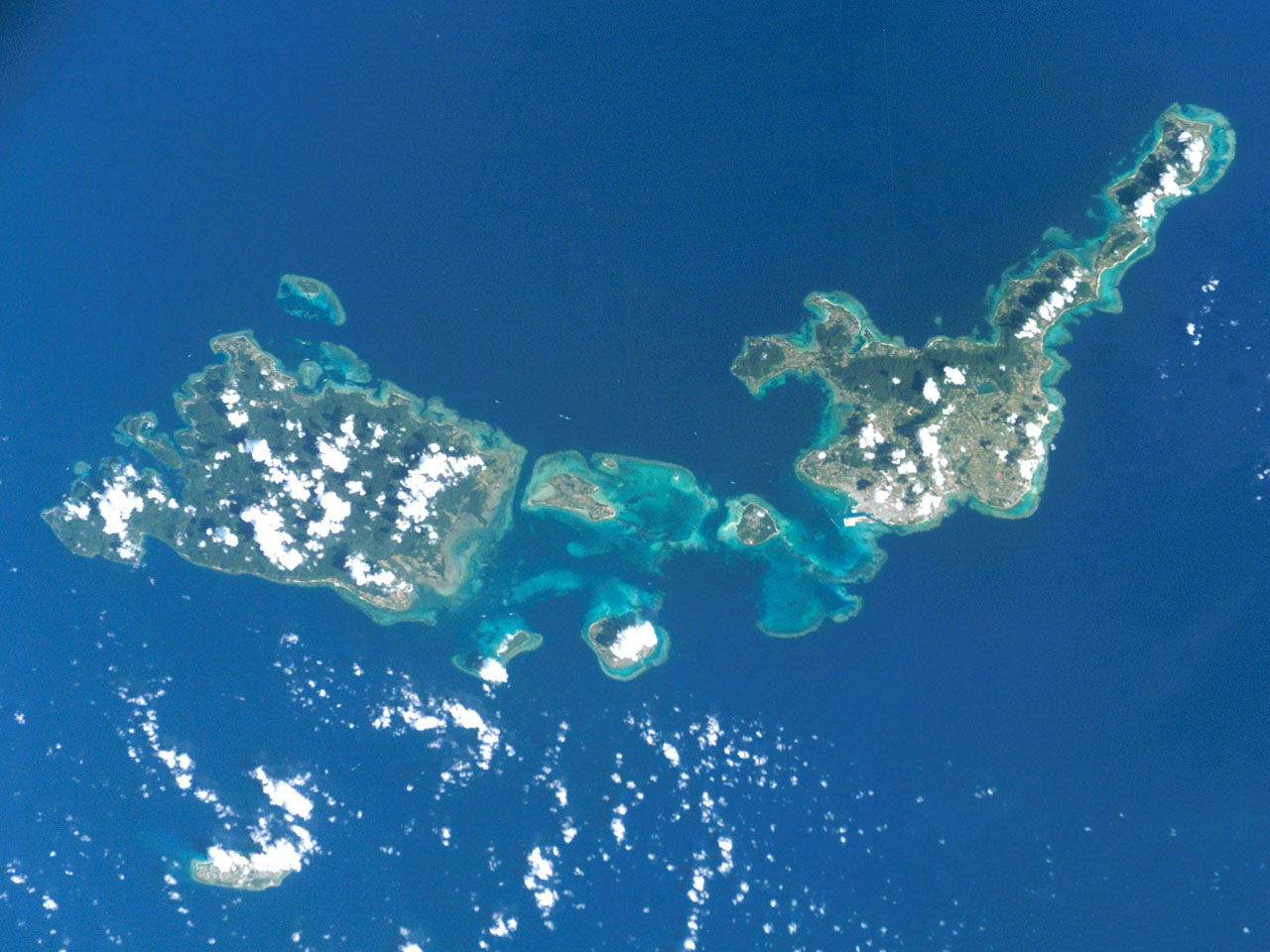
Satellite image of Iriomote and Ishigaki in the Yaeyama Islands

== Culture ==
The Yonaguni language is the indigenous language of the island of Yonaguni. The Yaeyama language is the indigenous language of the rest of the islands. Japanese is now the primary language of most of the population.

The Yaeyama Islands are home to the production of traditional Okinawan textiles.

The Mushaama Festival on Hateruma Island is a harvest festival is celebrated during Obon. It features a parade with the local fertility god Miruku and his children (the local children), shishi (lion) dances, and staff dances.
