= Yonaguni language =

Southern Ryukyuan language

Yonaguni
- 与那国物言 ドゥナンムヌイ Dunan Munui
- Pronunciation: [dunaŋmunui]
- Native to: Japan
- Region: Yonaguni
- Native speakers: 400 (2008)
- Language family: Japonic: Ryukyuan; Southern Ryukyuan; Macro-Yaeyama; Yonaguni
- Writing system: Japanese

Language codes
- ISO 639-3: yoi
- Glottolog: yona1241
- ELP: Yonaguni
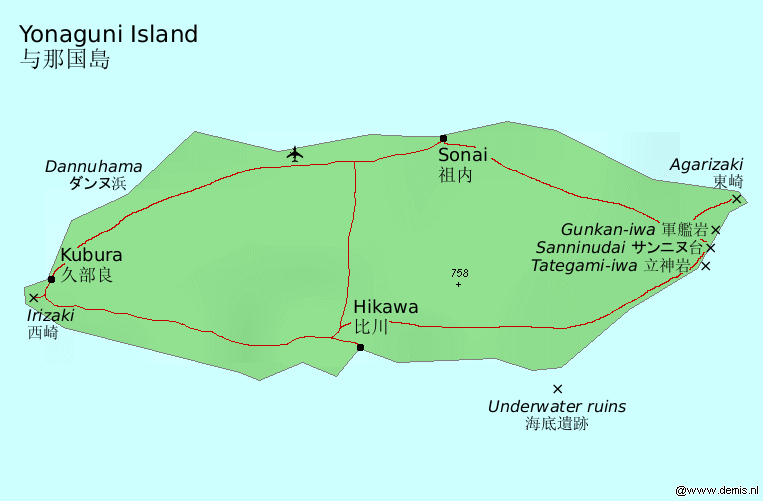

- Yonaguni is classified as Severely Endangered by the UNESCO Atlas of the World's Languages in Danger.

The Yonaguni language (与那国物言/ドゥナンムヌイ Dunan Munui) is a Southern Ryukyuan language spoken by around 400 people on the island of Yonaguni, in the Ryukyu Islands, the westernmost of the chain lying just east of Taiwan. It is most closely related to Yaeyama. Due to the Japanese policy on languages, the language is not recognized by the government, which instead calls it the Yonaguni dialect (与那国方言, Yonaguni hōgen). As classified by UNESCO, the Yonaguni language is one of the most endangered languages in all of Japan, after the Ainu language.

== Phonology ==
=== Vowels ===
The table below shows the vowels present in the Yonaguni language. Vowels which are only allophonic or marginal appear in parentheses.

	Front	Central	Back
Close	i		u
Near-close	(ɪ)		(ʊ)
Close-Mid			(o)^{[a]}
Open		a	(ɑ)

^a [o] can also be recognized as an independent phoneme and not just as an allophone of /u/. However, its distribution is very limited. Excluding a few interjections, the only morpheme in which it appears is the sentence-final, exclamatory particle do.

=== Consonants ===
The table below shows the consonants present in the Yonaguni language.

Consonants
		Labial	Alveolar	Palatal	Velar	Glottal
Nasal		m	n		ŋ	
Plosive	lenis		tʰ		kʰ	
Plosive	fortis	pˀ	tˀ		kˀ	
Plosive	voiced	b	d		ɡ	
Affricate			tsˀ (Note: The alveolar sibilants palatalize into alveolo-palatal [tɕˀ] and [ɕ] before /j/ and /i/.)			
Fricative			s			h (Note: /h/ is realized as [ʍ], [ɸ] and [ç] before /w/, /u/ and /i/, respectively.)
Sonorant			ɾ	j	w	

Plosive and affricate phonemes have three-way contrast. Hirayama et al. (1967) describe the contrast as voiceless non-laryngealized, voiceless laryngealized, and voiced. Yamada et al. (2015) describe the contrast as fortis (unaspirated and tense), lenis (weakly aspirated and lax), and voiced. The lenis/fortis distinction neutralized in word-medial positions, both becoming phonetically fortis.

In positions other than prevocalic, all nasals are phonetically homorganic with a following consonant (e.g. ng [ŋɡ], nd [nd], nb [mb]). Nasals are velar ([ŋ]) in final position.

=== Phonological cognates ===
As a Southern Ryukyuan language, Yonaguni, similar to Miyakoan and Yaeyama, has /b/ in place with Standard Japanese /w/, such as Yonaguni /bata/ ('stomach, belly'), cognate with Japanese /wata/ ('guts, bowels'). Yonaguni also has /d/ where Japanese and other Ryukyuan languages have /j/ (orthographically y). Thus, for example, Yonaguni /dama/ ('mountain') is cognate with Japanese and Yaeyama /jama/ ('id.'). Yonaguni /d/ is probably a recent development from an earlier */j/, however, judging from the fact that even the */j/ in loanwords of Sinitic origin is pronounced /d/ by speakers of the Yonaguni language, such as dasai 'vegetables' from Middle Chinese *jia-tsʰʌi (野菜). An entry in the late-15th-century Korean annals Seongjong Taewang Sillok records the local name of the island of Yonaguni in Idu script as 閏伊是麼, which has the Middle Korean reading zjuni sima, with sima glossed in the text as the Japonic word for 'island'. That is direct evidence of an intermediate stage of the fortition *j- > *z- > d-, leading to the modern name /dunaŋ/ 'Yonaguni'.

The Yonaguni language exhibits intervocalic voicing of plosives, as do many Japonic languages. It also exhibits the tendency for /ɡ/, especially when intervocalic, to be pronounced as a velar nasal /ŋ/, as in Standard Japanese.

=== Syllable structure ===
Below is the syllable template for Dunan:

(C (G) ) V_{1} (V_{2}) (N)

- C = consonant
- G = glide [w] or [j]
- V = vowel
- N = moraic nasal

The onset allows for a single consonant with the occasional presence of a glide. The nucleus can contain up to two vowels. The only allowable coda is a moraic nasal.

== Writing system ==
Yonaguni was once written with a unique writing system called Kaidā logograms. However, after conquest by the Ryukyu Kingdom and later annexation by the Empire of Japan, the logograms were replaced by Japanese kana and Kanji.

Yonaguni Orthography (Ikema 2003)
	/a/	/i/	/u/	/e/	/o/	/ja/	/ju/
/Ø/	ア /a/ [a]	イ /i/ [i]	ウ /u/ [u]	エ /e/ [e]	オ /o/ [o]	ヤ /ya/ [ja]	ユ /yu/ [ju]
/k/	カ /ka/ [ka]	キ /ki/ [ki]	ク /ku/ [ku]	ケ /ke/ [ke]	コ /ko/ [ko]	キャ /kya/ [kja]	キュ /kyu/ [kju]
/k'/	か /k'a/ [kˀa]	き /k'i/ [kˀi]	く /k'u/ [kˀu]	け /k'e/ [kˀe]	こ /k'o/ [kˀo]		
/g/	ガ /ga/ [ga]	ギ /gi/ [gi]	グ /gu/ [gu]	ゲ /ge/ [ge]	ゴ /go/ [go]	ギャ /gya/ [gja]	ギュ /gyu/ [gju]
/ŋ/	カ゚ /ŋa/ [ŋa]	キ゚ /ŋi/ [ŋi]	ク゚ /ŋu/ [ŋu]	ケ゚ /ŋe/ [ŋe]	コ゚ /ŋo/ [ŋo]		
/s/	サ /sa/ [sa]	シ /ɕi/ [ɕi]	ス /su/ [su]	セ /se/ [se]	ソ /so/ [so]	シャ /ɕa/ [ɕa]	シュ /ɕu/ [ɕu]
/t/	タ /ta/ [ta]	ティ /ti/ [ti]	トゥ /tu/ [tu]	テ /te/ [te]	ト /to/ [to]		
/t'/	た /t'a/ [tˀa]	てぃ /t'i/ [tˀi]	とぅ /t'u/ [tˀu]	て /t'e/ [tˀe]	と /t'o/ [tˀo]		
/d/	ダ /da/ [da]	ディ /di/ [di]	ドゥ /du/ [du]	デ /de/ [de]	ド /do/ [do]		
/ts'/	ツャ /ts'a/ [tsˀa]	チ /tɕ'i/ [tɕˀi]	ツ /ts'u/ [tsˀu]				
/n/	ナ /na/ [na]	ニ /ni/ [ni]	ヌ /nu/ [nu]	ネ /ne/ [ne]	ノ /no/ [no]		
/h/	ハ /ha/ [ha]	ヒ /hi/ [çi]	フ /hu/ [hu]	ヘ /he/ [he]	ホ /ho/ [ho]	ヒャ /ça/ [hja]	ヒュ /çu/ [hju]
/p/	パ /pa/ [pa]	ピ /pi/ [pi]	プ /pu/ [pu]	ペ /pe/ [pe]	ポ /po/ [po]	ピャ /pya/ [pja]	ピュ /pyu/ [pju]
/b/	バ /ba/ [ba]	ビ /bi/ [bi]	ブ /bu/ [bu]	ベ /be/ [be]	ボ /bo/ [bo]	ビャ /bya/ [bja]	ビュ /byu/ [bju]
/m/	マ /ma/ [ma]	ミ /mi/ [mi]	ム /mu/ [mu]	メ /me/ [me]	モ /mo/ [mo]		
/w/	ワ /wa/ [wa]						
/r/	ラ /ra/ [ɾa]	リ /ri/ [ɾi]	ル /ru/ [ɾu]	レ /re/ [ɾe]	ロ /ro/ [ɾo]		
	ン /N/* [n, m, ŋ]	ー /ː/ [ː]	ッ (final) /ʔ/ [ʔ]	ッ /Q/ [k, g, s, ts, t, d, h, b, p]			

* /m/ before labial consonants and /ŋ/ before velar consonants. Example ディンブンキルン [dimbuŋkirun] "to have a goal for".
