= Yaeyama language =

Southern Ryukyuan language

Yaeyama
- 八重山物言; ヤイマムニ; Yaimamuni
- Pronunciation: [jaimamuni]
- Native to: Japan
- Region: Yaeyama Islands
- Ethnicity: 47,600 (2000)
- Language family: Japonic: Ryukyuan; Southern Ryukyuan; Macro-Yaeyama; Yaeyama
- Writing system: Japanese

Language codes
- ISO 639-3: rys
- Glottolog: yaey1239
- ELP: Yaeyama
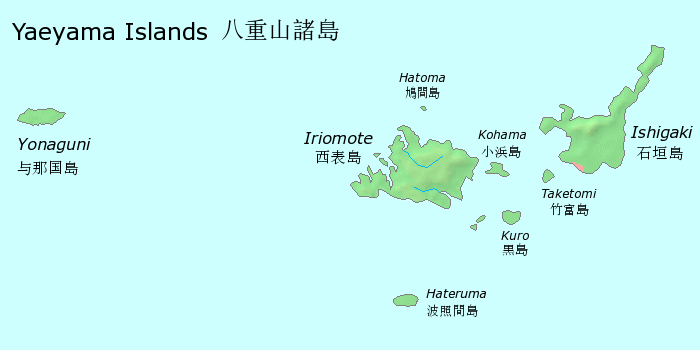

- Yaeyama is classified as Definitely Endangered by the UNESCO Atlas of the World's Languages in Danger

The Yaeyama language (八重山物言, ヤイマムニ, Yaimamuni) is a Southern Ryukyuan language spoken in the Yaeyama Islands, the southernmost inhabited island group in Japan, with a combined population of about 53,000. The Yaeyama Islands are situated in the Southern Ryukyu Islands, southwest of the Miyako Islands and to the east of Taiwan. Yaeyama (Yaimamunii) is most closely related to Miyako. The number of competent native speakers is not currently known; as a consequence of Japanese language policy which refers to the language as the Yaeyama dialect (八重山方言, Yaeyama hōgen), reflected in the education system, people below the age of 60 tend to not use the language except in songs and rituals, and the younger generation exclusively uses Japanese as their first language. As compared to the Japanese kokugo, or Japanese national language, other Ryukyuan languages such as Okinawan and Amami have also been referred to as dialects of Japanese. Yaeyama is noted as having a comparatively lower "language vitality" among neighboring Ryukyuan languages.

Yaeyama is spoken in Ishigaki, Taketomi, Kohama, Kuroshima, Hatoma, Aragusuku, Iriomote and Hateruma, with complications of mutual intelligibility between dialects as a result of the Yaeyama Islands' large geographic span. The speech of Yonaguni Island, while related, is usually considered a separate language. The Taketomi dialect may instead be a Northern Ryukyuan language common to Okinawan dialects that later converged with the other Yaeyama dialects.

== History ==
The Ryukyuan language split from Proto-Japonic when its speakers migrated to the Ryukyu Islands. The Ryukyuan languages split from Proto-Japonic in the last 2,000 years, though estimates offer different potential time periods ranging from 2 BCE to 800 CE.

The Yaeyaman languages are classified under a Macro-Yaeyama branch of the Southern Ryukyuan languages. Innovations in Southern Ryukyuan languages, splitting Macro-Yaeyama and Miyako language families, include an "irregular shift from tone class B to A in 'how many' and a special form for 'garden'". Macro-Yaeyama innovations, grouping together Yaeyama languages and Dunan contain the "grammaticalization of 'know' as a potential auxiliary", similarities between multiple special forms such as "bud", "happy", "fresh", and "dirt", as well as a semantic conflation of "nephew" to mean either "nephew" or "niece". Yaeyaman dialects are differentiated from Dunan by innovations regarding a replacement of the verb "sell" with a causative form of "buy", a special form of "get wet", as well as an irregular shift of "*g>n" in 'beard'.

Some of the pronunciations that disappeared from Japanese around the 8th century, during Japan's Nara period, can still be found in the Yaeyama languages. One example is the initial "p" sound, which in Japanese became an "h", while remaining a "p" in Yaeyama, except for "pu", which became "fu" in Yaeyama.

| | Proto-Japonic | Modern Japanese | Yaeyama |
|---|---|---|---|
| "Belly" | *para | hara | paru |
| "Boat" | *punay | fune | funi |
| "Dove" | *pato | hato | patu |

While the Yaeyama language was more "conservative" in some aspects, in the sense of preserving certain pronunciations, in other aspects it was more innovative. One example is the vowel system. Old Japanese had eight vowels (some perhaps diphthongs); this has been reduced to five in modern Japanese, but in Yaeyaman, vowel reduction has progressed further, to three vowels. Generally, when modern Japanese has an "e", the Yaeyama cognate will have an "i" (this is seen in "funi" above); and where modern Japanese has an "o", the Yaeyama cognate will have a "u" (as seen in "patu" above).

| | Proto-Japonic | Modern Japanese | Yaeyama |
|---|---|---|---|
| "Thing" | *mənə | mono | munu |
| "Seed" | *tanay | tane | tani |
| "Start" | *pansimay | hajime | pazïmi |

However, in the cases where Proto-Japonic has an *e, *əy, or *o that is not word final, Japanese is no more conservative than Yaeyama in this regard, as both underwent the same vowel raising at different stages, as shown below:

| | Proto-Japonic | Modern Japanese | Yaeyama |
|---|---|---|---|
| "Water" | *mentu | mizu | mizï |
| "Tree" | *kəy | ki | kī |
| "Wheat" | *monki | mugi | mun |

Like all Southern Ryukyuan languages, Yaeyama shows a "b" word initially compared to Japanese "w". This is perhaps thought to be an innovation from earlier "w". This also includes Japanese cognates that once had an initial "w" but was dropped later in the history of the language, such as "wodori" > "odori".

| | Proto-Japonic | Modern Japanese | Yaeyama |
|---|---|---|---|
| "Intestines" | *wata | wata | bada |
| "Young" | *waka | wakai | bagasan |
| "Dance" | *wəntəri | odori | budurï |

Many of these features have been lost in the history of the Okinawan language or were innovated compared to all other Japonic languages. One explanation for this is that it is possible to travel by sea from mainland Japan to the main island of Okinawa while keeping one island or another in sight at nearly all times; but there is a larger gap between the main island of Okinawa and the Yaeyamas, which would have required several nights on the open sea. For this reason, there was less traffic between mainland Japan and the Yaeyama islands, allowing further linguistic divergence.

== Phonology ==
=== Hateruma ===
The Hateruma dialect contains seven vowels, with no distinction between long-short vowel length, and sixteen consonants. Hateruma is noted for having more vowels than any other dialect. A pharyngeal e is believed to be a result of "the coalescence of Proto-Yaeyama diphthongs '*ai and *aɨ.'"

There are three accent pitches present in Hateruma: falling, level, and rising accents. To correlate pitches, there are three classes of words under an "A, B, C" system; class A words correlate with the falling pitch, and class B and C are shown to have "an uneven correspondence with the Level and Rising patterns."

The Hateruma dialect is regarded as an innovative variety of Yaeyama Ryukyuan. It is the only dialect of the Yaeyama group to feature the pharyngeal eˤ, sonorant devoicing, noun-final consonant epenthesis and spirantization of voiceless velar stop before the vowel *i. It is also considered to have the strongest aspiration among of the Yaeyama dialects, and is also the only variety to display nasal and liquid devoicing.

The pharyngeal eˤ may be regionally expressed as /ɛ/, especially among those over the age of 90.

Hateruma vowel sounds
| | Front | Central | Back |
|---|---|---|---|
| Close | i | ɨ | u |
| Mid | e eˤ | | o |
| Open | (ɛ) | a | |

Additionally, Hateruma has the following sixteen consonants:

Hateruma consonant sounds
| | | Labial | Dental/ Alveolar | (Alveolo)- Palatal | Velar | Uvular/ Glottal |
|---|---|---|---|---|---|---|
| Nasal | | m | n̪ | | (ŋ) | (ɴ) |
| Plosive | voiceless | p (pˢ) | t̪ | | k | |
| Plosive | voiced | b | d̪ | | g | |
| Fricative/ Affricate | voiceless | f | s ts | (ɕ) (tɕ) (ç) | | h |
| Fricative/ Affricate | voiced | | z (dz) | (ʑ) (dʑ) | | |
| Vibrant | | | r~ɾ | | | |
| Approximant | | | | j | w | |

Main allophonic realizations include the following:

- [pˢ] appears only before the central closed vowel /ɨ/.
- Palatal or alveolo-palatal allophones appear before the front closed vowel /i/.
- /n/ is usually a dental nasal [n̪] but is realized as [ɴ] in final position, [ŋ] before velars (/k, g/) and as [m] before bilabials.
- /r/ is sometimes trilled when the preceding vowel is devoiced: /garasï/ [ɡʰḁrasɨ] ~ [ɡʰḁɾasɨ].

=== Hatoma ===
The Hatoma dialect contains two "tonal categories", denoted as marked and unmarked. Words of the marked class are analyzed as being "high from the syllable containing the second mora" and unmarked words begin from a low pitch but end with a low pitch. "Peripheral tone classes" are also noted in certain nouns and adverb.

Hatoma is noted for having the simplest verb conjugation and morphophonology of the Yaeyama dialects. One phonological process is a sequence of i, followed by e, becoming e in the case of i being in a light syllable and ja(a) in a heavy syllable. There is also a process of a sequence u, followed by a sequence becoming a long o with u in a light syllable and uwa(a) in a heavy syllable.

=== Miyara ===
The Miyara subdialect of Ishigaki has 21 consonants and 6 vowels in its inventory. It is noted that e and o are always long, as in many varieties of Ryukyuan. Long vowels are often shortened before the moraic nasal.

Miyara Vowel Sounds
| | Front | Central | Back |
|---|---|---|---|
| Close | i | ɨ | u |
| Mid | e | | o |
| Open | | a | |

Miyara Consonant Sounds
| | Bilabial | Alveolar | Palatal | Velar | Glottal |
|---|---|---|---|---|---|
| Stop | p b | t d | | k ɡ | ʔ |
| Nasal | m | n | | ŋ | |
| Fricative | ɸ | s z | ʃ | | h |
| Affricate | | t͡s | t͡ʃ d͡ʒ | | |
| Liquid | | ɾ | | | |
| Approximant | | | j | w | |

Following /s/, /z/, and /t͡s/, underlying /u/ neutralizes to [ɨ]. After nasals (/m/, /n/), glides (/j/, /w/) alveolar stops (/t/, /d/) or /h/, /ɸ/, and /ʃ/, the high central vowel /ɨ/ does not appear.

=== Shiraho ===
Shiraho Vowel Sounds
| | Front | Central | Back |
|---|---|---|---|
| Close | i | ɨ | u |
| Mid | e | | o |
| Open | | a | |

Shiraho Consonant Sounds
| | Bilabial | Alveolar | Palatal | Velar | Glottal |
|---|---|---|---|---|---|
| Stop | p b | t d | | k ɡ | |
| Nasal | m | n̥ n | | | |
| Fricative | ɸ | s z | | | h |
| Affricate | | ts | tɕ | | |
| Liquid | | ɾ | | | |
| Approximant | | | j | w | |

== Syntax ==
=== Hateruma ===
Hateruma uses morphology and suffixation in its verbs and adjectives. Derivational morphology expresses causative and passive forms in verbs; potential forms are equal to the passive form. Verbal inflection expresses two types of indicatives, an imperative form, as well as a cohortative and prohibitive ending. Adjectives, nouns and verbs also compound and reduplicate, especially in producing adverbs from adjectives.

Hateruma has a case system with nine case markings and particles. There are eleven auxiliary verbs to denote forms of mood and aspect.

=== Ishigaki ===
The Ishigaki dialect is noted for having a peculiar expression of cardinal directions. It is found that when speaking to other native speakers, Ishigaki-speakers use an "intrinsic" and "relative" frame of reference system in which "north" and "south" are expressed in an intrinsic frame of reference as the verbs agaru ("go up, climb") and oriru ("go down, descend"), instead of Standard Japanese kita ("north") and minami ("south"). It is found that most speakers express "east" and "west" as Standard Japanese hidari ("left") and migi ("right") in a relative frame of reference.

=== Miyara ===
Miyaran Yaeyama has been argued to have no marked attributive form, unlike Okinawan and Old Japanese. However, there is evidence that phonological conditioning, namely an epenthetic -r marking between present stative -i and present tense marker -u (in order to avoid subsequent vowel sequences), accounts for non-overt attributive markings.

=== Wh-Questions ===
In Yaeyama, wh-phrases are marked with du, in contrast to Standard Japanese ka.

| Subject wh-question and answer | Object wh-question and answer: |
|---|---|
| taa-du suba-ba fai who-Q soba-PRT ate Who ate soba? | kurisu-ja noo-ba-du fai Chris-TOP what-PRT-Q ate What did Chris eat? |

Omitting du from a wh-phrase is considered incorrect grammar. Yet, du marking is optional for adverbial or adjunct wh-phrases. In questions with multiple wh-words, only one can be marked with du. Further research is needed to learn more about Wh-questions in Yaeyama.

== Endangerment and revitalization ==
The endangerment of Ryukyuan languages is attributed to historical and governmental factors. Originating in the 1872 annexation of the Okinawan Islands to Japan and the creation of Okinawa Prefecture in 1879, there has since been a movement referred to as the "Japanization of the Luchuan Islands". A national language movement known as kokugo has developed in result of this. The kokugo movement includes the 1907 implementation of the Ordinance of Dialect Regulation, demoting diverse Ryukyuan languages to the status of "dialects" (hogen) and discouraging of speaking these dialects in the Japanese school system.

There is estimated to be a remaining 7,000–10,000 Yaeyama speakers, mostly being spoken in the home. There have been many revival societies and movements erected to preserve Ryukyuan languages and culture. The earliest language revival movement is regarded as being part of the Koza Society of Culture, instituted in 1955. A large benefactor to preserving and reviving Ryukyuan languages is the Society for Spreading Okinawan (Uchinaguchi fukyu kyogikai), whose constitution is dedicated to initiating dialect classes and Okinawan teacher training programs, as well as advancing towards a singular Okinawan orthography. There are also notable submovements in Ryukyuan language survival present in Okinawan radio broadcasts, as well as "presentation circles and plays" and language classes integrated in the Okinawan school curriculum on the local level.
