= Animal feed =

Food for various animals

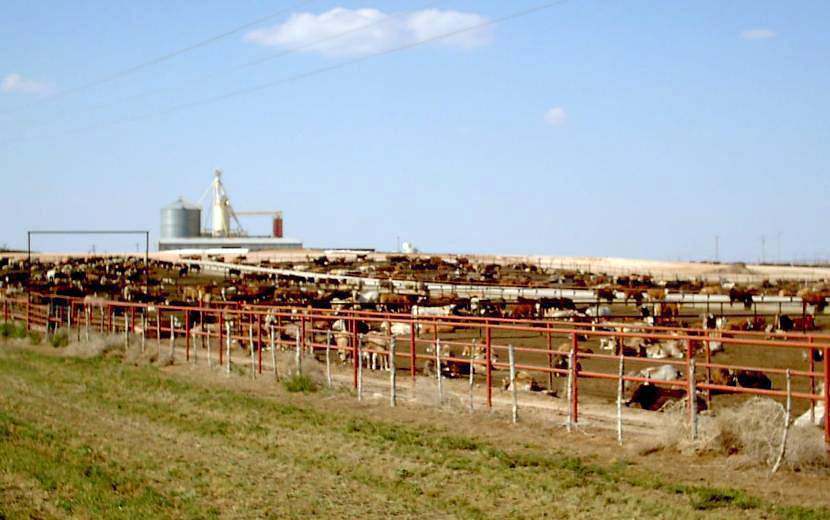
A feedlot in Texas, United States, where cattle are "finished" (fattened on grains) prior to slaughter

Share of cereals used for animal feed

Animal feed is food given to domestic animals, especially livestock, in the course of animal husbandry. There are two basic types: fodder and forage. Used alone, the word feed more often refers to fodder. Animal feed is an important input to animal agriculture, and is frequently the main cost of the raising or keeping of animals. Farms typically try to reduce cost for this food, by growing their own, grazing animals, or supplementing expensive feeds with substitutes, such as food waste like spent grain from beer brewing.

Animal wellbeing is highly dependent on feed that reflects a well balanced nutrition. Some modern agricultural practices, such as fattening cows on grains or in feed lots, have detrimental effects on the environment and animals. For example, increased corn or other grain in feed for cows, makes their microbiomes more acidic weakening their immune systems and making cows a more likely vector for E. coli, while other feeding practices can improve animal impacts. For example, feeding cows certain kinds of seaweed, reduces their production of methane, reducing the greenhouse gases from meat production.

When an environmental crisis strikes farmers or herders, such as a drought or extreme weather driven by climate change, farmers often have to shift to more expensive manufactured animal feed, which can negatively effect their economic viability. For example, a 2017 drought in Senegal reduced the availability of grazing lands leading to skyrocketing demand and prices for manufactured animal feed, causing farmers to sell large portions of their herds. Additionally agriculture for producing animal feed puts pressure on land use: feed crops need land that otherwise might be used for human food and can be one of the driving factors for deforestation, soil degradation and climate change.

== Fodder ==
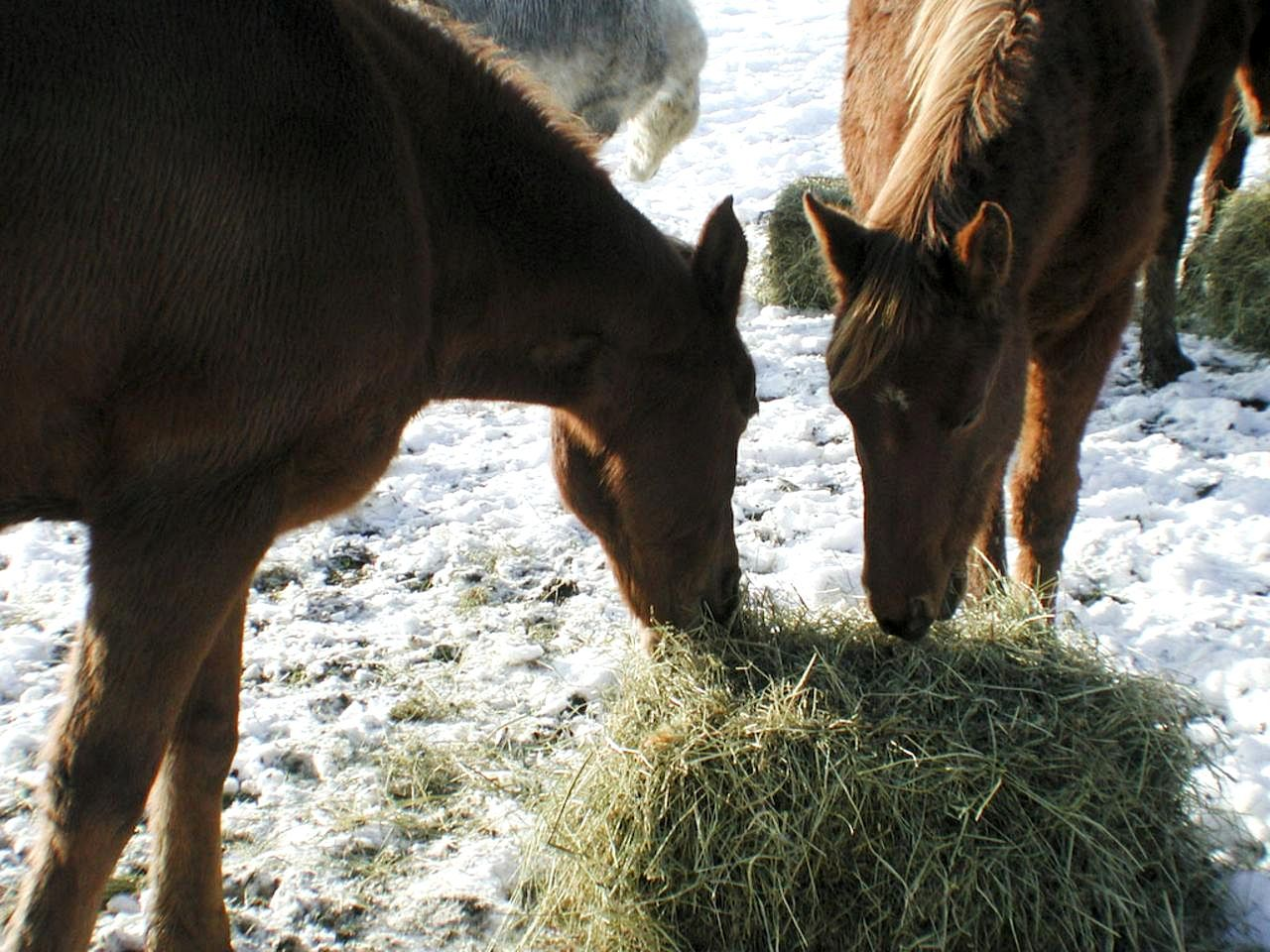
Equine nutritionists recommend that 50% or more of a horse's diet by weight should be forages, such as hay

"Fodder" refers particularly to foods or forages given to the animals (including plants cut and carried to them), rather than that which they forage for themselves. It includes hay, straw, silage, compressed and pelleted feeds, oils and mixed rations, and sprouted grains and legumes. Grass and crop residues are the most important source of animal feed globally. Grains account for 11% of the total dry matter consume by livestock at global level and oilseed crops by-products such as soybean cakes account for 5%. The amount of grain used to produce the same unit of meat varies substantially between species and production systems. According to FAO, ruminants require an average of 2.8 kg of grains to produce 1 kg of meat while monogastrics require 3.2. These figures vary between 0.1 for extensive ruminant systems to 9.4 in beef feedlots, and from 0.1 in backyard chicken production to 4 in industrial pig production. Farmed fish can also be fed on grain and use even less than poultry. The two most important feed grains are maize and soybean, and the United States is by far the largest exporter of both, averaging about half of the global maize trade and 40% of the global soya trade in the years leading up the 2012 drought. Other feed grains include wheat, oats, barley, and rice, among many others.

Traditional sources of animal feed include household food scraps and the byproducts of food processing industries such as milling and brewing. Material remaining from milling oil crops like peanuts, soy, and corn are important sources of fodder. Scraps fed to pigs are called slop, and those fed to chicken are called chicken scratch. Brewer's spent grain is a byproduct of beer making that is widely used as animal feed.

Compound feed is fodder that is blended from various raw materials and additives. These blends are formulated according to the specific requirements of the target animal. They are manufactured by feed compounders as meal type, pellets or crumbles. The main ingredients used in commercially prepared feed are the feed grains, which include corn, soybeans, sorghum, oats, and barley.

Compound feed may also include premixes, which may also be sold separately. Premixes are composed of microingredients such as vitamins, minerals, chemical preservatives, antibiotics, fermentation products, and other ingredients that are purchased from premix companies, usually in sacked form, for blending into commercial rations. Because of the availability of these products, farmers who use their own grain can formulate their own rations and be assured that their animals are getting the recommended levels of minerals and vitamins, although they are still subject to the Veterinary Feed Directive.

According to the American Feed Industry Association, as much as $20 billion worth of feed ingredients are purchased each year. These products range from grain mixes to orange rinds and beet pulps. The feed industry is one of the most competitive businesses in the agricultural sector and is by far the largest purchaser of U.S. corn, feed grains, and soybean meal. Tens of thousands of farmers with feed mills on their own farms are able to compete with huge conglomerates with national distribution. Feed crops generated $23.2 billion in cash receipts on U.S. farms in 2001. At the same time, farmers spent a total of $24.5 billion on feed that year.

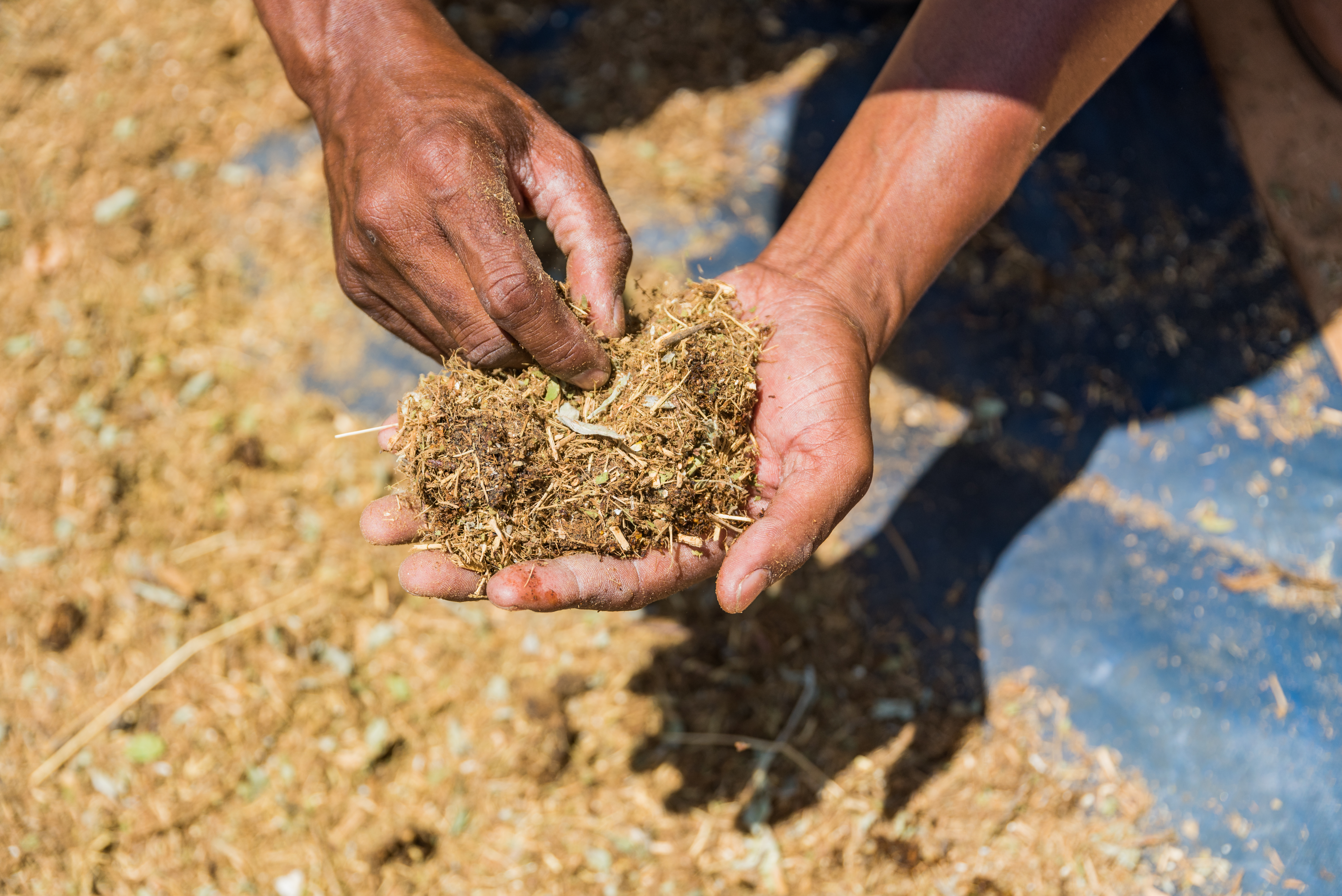
Milled encroacher bush that is used as a basis for local fodder production in Namibia

With progressing climate change and reoccurring droughts, extensive rangeland agriculture increasingly suffers of forage shortage. Innovative approaches to substitute forage include the harvesting and processing of shrubs into animal feed. This has been extensively researched and applied in Namibia, using waste biomass resulting from woody encroachment.

In 2011, around 734.5 million tons of feed were produced annually around the world.

=== History ===
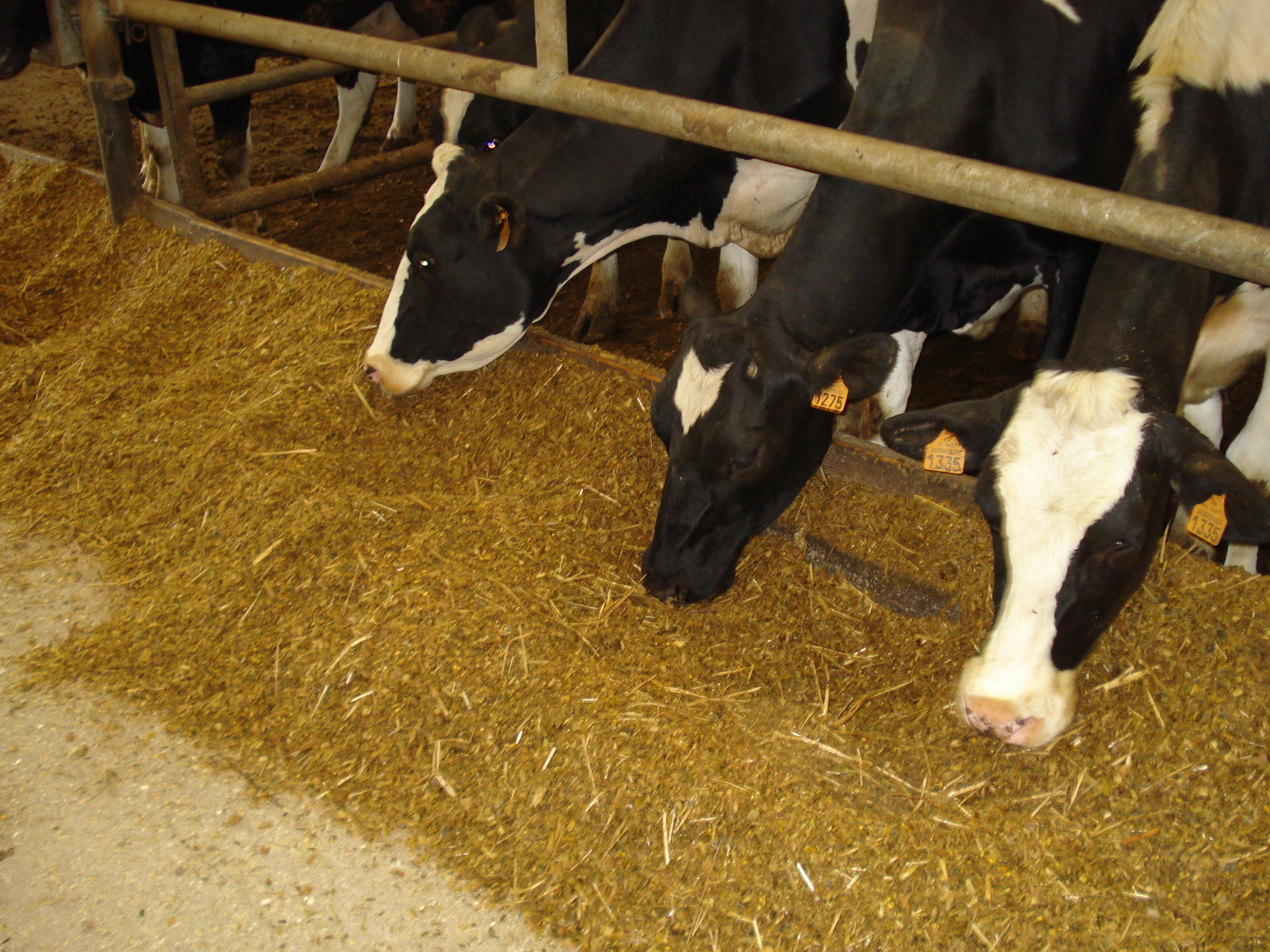
Cattle eating a total mixed ration

The US Animal Drug Availability Act 1996, passed during the Clinton era, was the first attempt in that country to regulate the use of medicated feed.

In 1997, in response to outbreaks of Bovine spongiform encephalopathy, commonly known as mad cow disease, the United States and Canada banned a range of animal tissues from cattle feed. Feed bans in United States (2009) Canada (2007) expanded on this, prohibiting the use of potentially infectious tissue in all animal and pet food and fertilizers.

== Forage ==
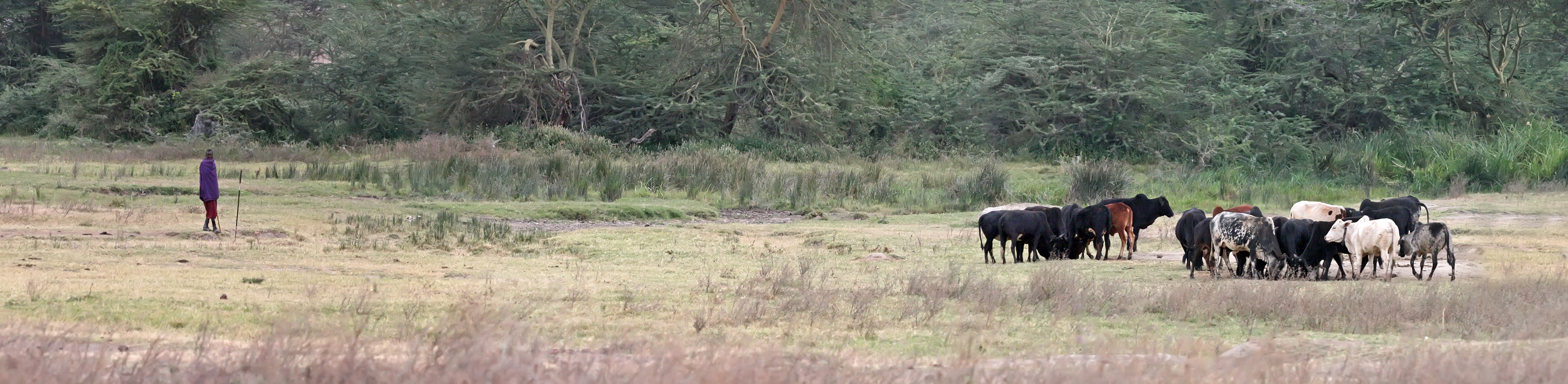
A herdsman from the Maasai people watches as his cattle graze in the Ngorongoro crater, Tanzania.

Forage is a plant material (mainly plant leaves and stems) eaten by grazing livestock. Historically, the term forage has meant only plants eaten by the animals directly as pasture, crop residue, or immature cereal crops, but it is also used more loosely to include similar plants cut for fodder and carried to the animals, especially as hay or silage.

While the term forage has a broad definition, the term forage crop is used to define crops, annual or biennial, which are grown to be utilized by grazing or harvesting as a whole crop.

== Manufacture ==
Feed manufacturing refers to the process of producing animal feed from raw agricultural products. Fodder produced by manufacturing is formulated to meet specific animal nutrition requirements for different species of animals at different life stages. According to the American Feed Industry Association (AFIA), there are four basic steps:

1. Receive raw ingredients: Feed mills receive raw ingredients from suppliers. Upon arrival, the ingredients are weighed, tested and analyzed for various nutrients and to ensure their quality and safety.
2. Create a formula: Nutritionists work side by side with scientists to formulate nutritionally sound and balanced diets for livestock, poultry, aquaculture and pets. This is a complex process, as every species has different nutritional requirements.
3. Mix ingredients: Once the formula is determined, the mill mixes the ingredients to create a finished product.
4. Package and label: Manufacturers determine the best way to ship the product. If it is prepared for retail, it will be "bagged and tagged," or placed into a bag with a label that includes the product's purpose, ingredients and instructions. If the product is prepared for commercial use, it will be shipped in bulk.

== Nutrition ==
In agriculture today, the nutritional needs of farm animals are well understood and may be satisfied through natural forage and fodder alone, or augmented by direct supplementation of nutrients in concentrated, controlled form. The nutritional quality of feed is influenced not only by the nutrient content, but also by many other factors such as feed presentation, hygiene, digestibility, and effect on intestinal health.

Feed additives provide a mechanism through which these nutrient deficiencies can be resolved, improving animal rate of growth, health, and well-being. Many farm animals have a diet largely consisting of grain-based ingredients because of the higher costs of quality feed.

== Major ingredients ==
=== Chelates ===
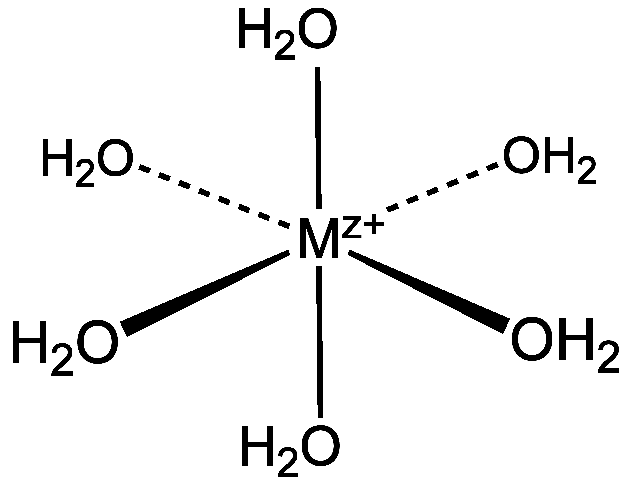
Structure of typical metal ion in the absence of chelate.

Chelates in animal feed is jargon for metalloorganic compounds added to animal feed. The compounds provide sources of various metals that improve the health or marketability of the animal. Typical metal salts are derived from cobalt, copper, iron, manganese, and zinc. The objective of supplementation with trace minerals is to avoid a variety of deficiency diseases. Trace minerals carry out key functions in relation to many metabolic processes, most notably as cofactors for enzymes and hormones, and are essential for optimum health, growth and productivity. For example, supplementary minerals help ensure good growth, bone development, feathering in birds, hoof, skin and hair quality in mammals, enzyme structure and functions, and appetite. Deficiency of trace minerals affects many metabolic processes and so may be manifested by different symptoms, such as poor growth and appetite, reproductive failures, impaired immune responses, and general ill-thrift. From the 1950s to the 1990s most trace mineral supplementation of animal diets was in the form of inorganic minerals, and these largely eradicated associated deficiency diseases in farm animals. The role in fertility and reproductive diseases of dairy cattle highlights that organic forms of Zn are retained better than inorganic sources and so may provide greater benefit in disease prevention, notably mastitis and lameness.

Animals are thought to better absorb, digest, and use mineral chelates than inorganic minerals or simple salts. In theory lower concentrations of these minerals can be used in animal feeds. In addition, animals fed chelated sources of essential trace minerals excrete lower amounts in their faeces, and so there is less environmental contamination.

=== Insects ===
Insects may be able to supplement livestock feed, as they can transform low-value organic waste into nutritious products.

On the other hand, insect production presents a number of unresolved environmental challenges. Insect farms require constant heating at around 30 °C, resulting in high energy consumption. According to a study commissioned by the UK government, insects emit 5 to 13 times more greenhouse gases than soybean meal. Their rearing consumes more water per kilogram than pork, chicken or beef, and most insects are fed on high-quality agricultural by-products rather than waste, putting them in direct competition with existing animal feed. The issue of local biodiversity risk if insects escape into the wild has also been raised.

=== Soy ===
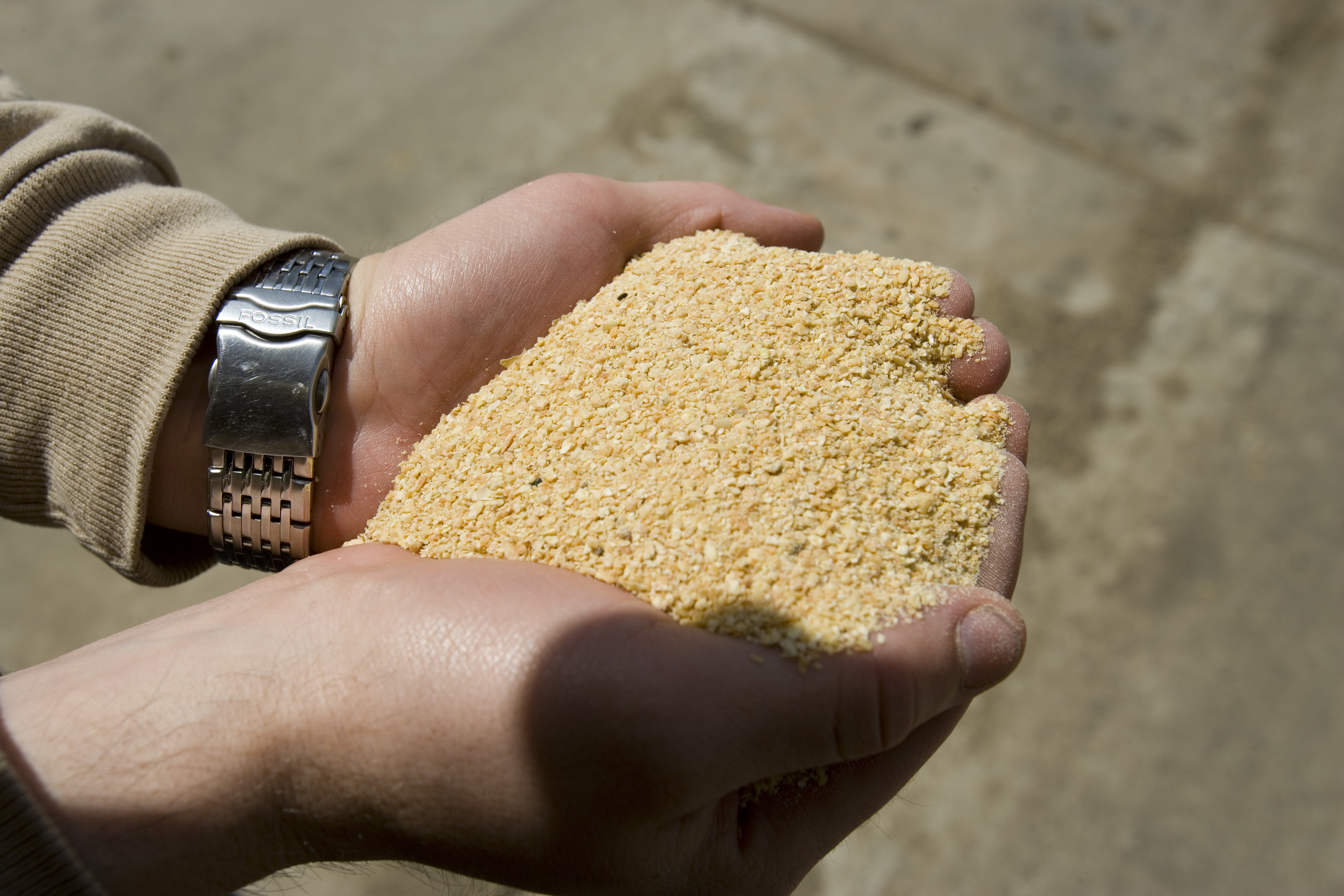
Soybean meal

Soybean meal is used in food and animal feeds, principally as a protein supplement, but also as a source of metabolizable energy. Typically 1 bushel (i.e. 60 lbs. or 27.2 kg) of soybeans yields 48 lbs. (21.8 kg) of soybean meal. Most soybean meal is defatted, produced as a co-product of soybean oil extraction. Some, but not all, soybean meal contains ground soybean hulls. Soybean meal is heat-treated during production, to denature the trypsin inhibitors of soybeans, which would otherwise interfere with protein digestion.

== By animal ==
- Bird feed
- Cat food
- Cattle feeding
- Dog food
- Equine nutrition
- Fish feed
- Pet food
- Pig farming
- Poultry feed
- Sheep husbandry

== See also ==
- Appetein
- FEFANA
- Hammermill
- Pellet mill
