= Feed additive =

A feed additive is an additive of extra nutrient or drug for livestock. Such additives include vitamins, amino acids, fatty acids, minerals, pharmaceutical, fungal products and steroidal compounds. The additives might impact feed presentation, hygiene, digestibility, or effect on intestinal health.

== Examples ==
=== Amino acids ===
Methionine, lysine, and tryptophan are commonly deficient in animal diets, so these amino acids are added to feed. In the case of methionine, 2-Hydroxy-4-(methylthio)butyric acid is often use in the place of methionine.

=== "Minerals" ===
Several elements enhance the growth characteristics of animals. Elements themselves are rarely used as additives but derivatives thereof. Ethylenediamine dihydroiodide (EDDI) is added to pet food and cattle feed to prevent iodine deficiency. A controversial additive is arsenic, often supplied in the form of the organoarsenic compound called roxarsone. It has been used in poultry production to increase weight gain and improve feed efficiency, and as a coccidiostat. As of June 2011, it was approved for chicken feed in the United States, Canada, Australia, and 12 other countries. The drug was also approved in the United States and elsewhere for use in pigs. Because of the essential character of the cobalt-containing vitamin B12, cobalt compounds are used in animal feeds, especially for ruminants.

== Regulation ==
=== United States ===
Prior to the Animal Drug Availability Act 1996, animal feed was available in two fashions: over-the-counter transacted, and by prescription from a veterinarian. Its associated regulation introduced the concept of a medicated feed, which is also available over-the-counter. The terminology for Veterinary Feed Directive was introduced by the Act.

=== EU ===
According to EU Regulation 1831/2003, all feed additives to be placed on the market within the European Union have to undergo a thorough approval process. Those who seek approval for the products as livestock food additives must submit them to the European Food Safety Authority (EFSA), the European Reference Laboratory, the European Commission and the member states. Evaluation criteria include safety for the animals, consumers and factory workers. For additives claiming an increase in "zootechnical" performance, sufficient empirical data must be presented to confirm those claims.

1. A feed additive shall be allocated to one or more of the following categories, depending on its functions and properties, in accordance with the procedure set out at Articles 7, 8 and 9:

1. technological additives: any substance added to feed for a technological purpose;
2. sensory additives: any substance, the addition of which to feed improves or changes the organoleptic properties of the feed, or the visual characteristics of the food derived from animals;
3. nutritional additives;
4. zootechnical additives: any additive used to affect favourably the performance of animals in good health or used to affect favourably the environment;
5. coccidiostats and histomonostats.
  — Article 6,

The last category was banned in 2009 by the EU, and replaced with probiotic alternatives.

== See also ==
- Fodder
- Compound feed
