= Feed manufacturing =

Production of animal feed

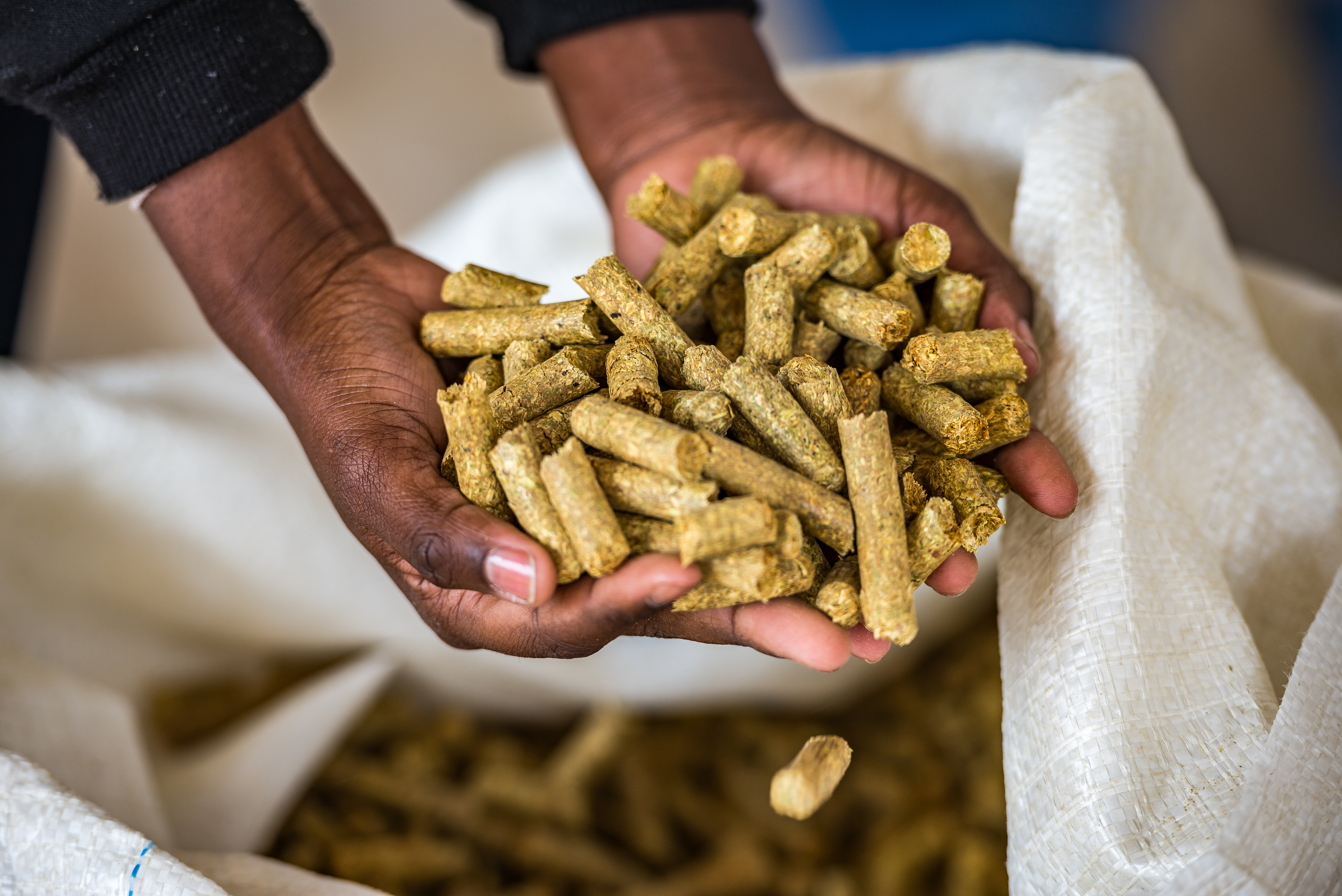
Manufactured animal feed

Feed manufacturing refers to the process of producing animal feed from raw agricultural products. Fodder produced by manufacturing is formulated to meet specific animal nutrition requirements for different species of animals at different life stages. According to the American Feed Industry Association (AFIA), there are four basic steps:

1. Receive raw ingredients: Feed mills receive raw ingredients from suppliers. Upon arrival, the ingredients are weighed, tested and analyzed for various nutrients and to ensure their quality and safety.
2. Create a formula: Nutritionists work side by side with scientists to formulate nutritionally sound and balanced diets for livestock, poultry, aquaculture and pets. This is a complex process, as every species has different nutritional requirements.
3. Mix ingredients: Once the formula is determined, the mill mixes the ingredients to create a finished product.
4. Package and label: Manufacturers determine the best way to ship the product. If it is prepared for retail, it will be "bagged and tagged," or placed into a bag with a label that includes the product's purpose, ingredients and instructions. If the product is prepared for commercial use, it will be shipped in bulk.

== Types ==
The Washington State Department of Agriculture defines feed as a mix of whole or processed grains, concentrates, and commercial feeds for all species of animals to include customer formula and labeled feeds, and pet feed. These feed are now commercially produced for the livestock, poultry, swine, and fish industries. The commercial production of feed is governed by state and national laws. For example, in Texas, whole or processed grains, concentrates, and commercial feeds with the purpose of feeding wildlife and pets should be duly described in words or animation for distribution by sellers. Most State and Federal codes have clearly stated that commercial feeds should not be adulterated.

Animal feeds have been broadly classified as follows:

- concentrates: High in energy, contains mainly cereal grains and their byproducts, or is prepared from high-protein oil meals or cakes, and byproducts resulting from sugar beets and sugarcane processing.
- roughages: grass pastures, or plant parts like hay, silage, root crops, straw, and stover. Diets given to different species are all not the same. For example, livestock animals are fed on a diet that consists mainly of roughages, while poultry, swine, and fish are fed with concentrates. Livestock in a feedlot may be fed with energy feeds which usually comes from grains, supplied alone or as part of a total mixed ration.

== Preparation and quality ==
The quality of the prepared feed ultimately depends on the quality of the material such as the grain or grass used; the raw material should be of very good quality. Commercial feed manufacturing is an industrial process, and therefore should follow HACCP procedures. The Food and Drug Administration (FDA) defines HACCP as "a management system in which food safety is addressed through the analysis and control of biological, chemical, and physical hazards from raw material production, procurement and handling, to manufacturing, distribution and consumption of the finished product".

The FDA regulates human food and animal feed for poultry, livestock, swine, and fish. Additionally, the FDA regulates pet food, which they estimate feeds over 177 million dogs, cats, and horses in America. Similar to human foods, animal feeds must be unadulterated and wholesome, prepared under good sanitary conditions, and truthfully be labeled to provide the required information to the consumer.

== Formulations ==
=== For swine ===
Feed makes up approximately 60% to 80% of the total cost of producing hogs. Manufactured feeds are not merely for satiety but also must provide animals the nutrients required for healthy growth. Formulating a swine ration considers the required nutrients at various growth stages in creating an appropriate feed. Three basic methods are used to formulate swine diets: Pearson square, algebraic equations and linear programs (computers). In recent times, microcomputer programs are available that will balance a diet for many nutrients and assist with economic decisions.

The basic nutrients required are crude protein, metabolizable energy, minerals, vitamins and water. The formulation procedure has both fixed and variable portions. Swine rations are generally based on a ground cereal grain as a carbohydrate source, soybean meal as a protein source, minerals like calcium and phosphorus are added, and vitamins. The feed can be fortified with byproducts of milk, meat by-products, cereal grains; and "specialty products." Antibiotics may also be added to fortify the feed and help the animal's health and growth.

Distillers dried grains with solubles (DDGS), which are rich in energy and protein, have been used in place of corn and soybean meal in some livestock and poultry feeds and corn DDGS have become the most popular, economical, and widely available alternative feed ingredient for use in U.S. swine diets in all phases of production. The U.S. Grain Council reported that corn DDGS is used primarily as an energy source in swine diets because it contains approximately the same amount of digestible energy (DE) and metabolizable energy (ME) as corn, although the ME content may be slightly reduced when feeding reduced-oil DDGS.

A 2007 study highlighted the recent trends in the use of DDGS, as many producers are including 20% DDGS in diets of swine in all categories. Although 20% is the recommended level of inclusion, some producers are successfully using greater inclusion rates. Inclusion rate of up to 35% DDGS has been used in diets fed to nursery pigs and finishing pigs.

=== For fish ===
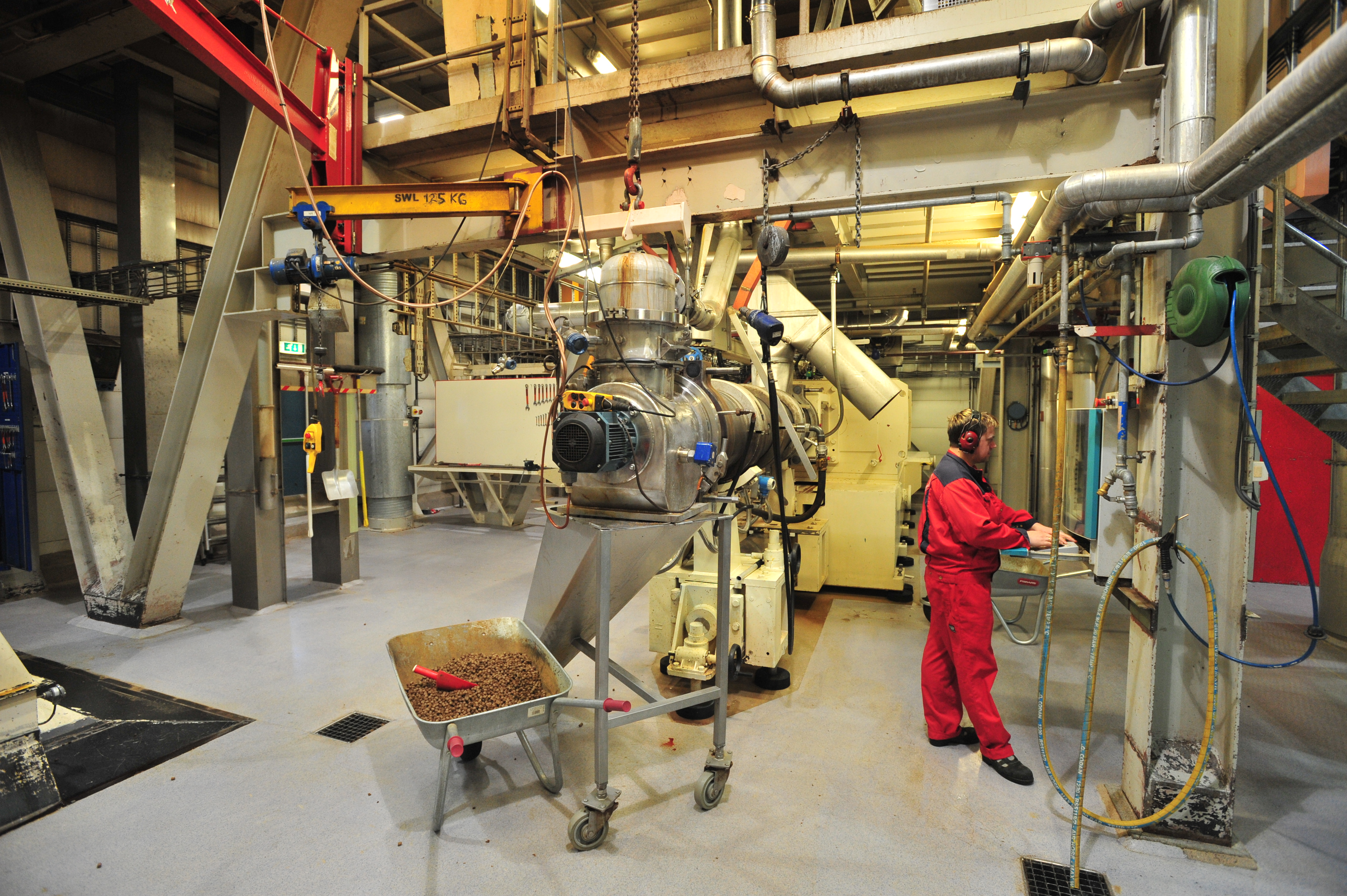
Commercial fish feed production in Stokmarknes, Norway

Farmed fish eat specially formulated pellet feeds containing the required nutrients for both fish health and the health of humans who eat fish. A fish feed should be nutritionally well-balanced and provide a good energy source for better growth. Commercially farmed fish are broadly classified into herbivorous fish, which eat mostly plant proteins like soy or corn, vegetable oils, minerals, and vitamins; and carnivorous fish, which are given fish oils and proteins. Carnivorous fish feed contains 30-50% fish meal and oil, but recent research suggests finding alternatives to fish meal in aquaculture diets.

Among the various feeds investigated, soybean meal appears to be a better alternative to fishmeal. Soybean meal prepared for the fish industry is heavily dependent on the particle sizes contained in the feed pellets. Today technology to process these types of feed is based on fish feed extruder machines. Fish feed extruder is essential for vegetable protein processing. Particle size influences feed digestibility. The particle sizes of fish pellet feed are influenced by both grain properties and the milling process. Properties of the grain include hardness and moisture content. The milling process affects particle size based on the mill equipment type used, and some properties of the mill equipment (for example corrugations, gap, speed, and energy consumption).

=== For poultry ===
As reports have indicated, feeding makes up the major cost in raising poultry animals as birds in general require feeding more than any other animals, particularly due to their faster growth rate and high rate of productivity. Feeding efficiency is reflected on the birds' performance and their products. According to National Research Council (1994), poultry requires at least 38% components in their feed. The ration of each feed components, although differing for each different stage of birds, must include carbohydrates, fats, proteins, minerals and vitamins. Carbohydrates, which are usually supplied by grains including corn, wheat, barley, etc. serves as a major energy source in poultry feed. Fats, usually from tallow, lard or vegetable oil are essentially required to provide important fatty acid in poultry feed for membrane integrity and hormone synthesis.

Proteins are important to supply the essential amino acids for the development of body tissues like muscles, nerves, cartilage, etc. Meals from soybean, canola, and corn gluten are the major source of plant protein in poultry diets. Supplementation of minerals are often required because grains, which are the main component of commercial feed contain very little amounts of these. Calcium, phosphorus, chlorine, magnesium, potassium and sodium are required in larger amounts by poultry. Vitamins, such as vitamin A, B, C, D, E, and K, on the other hand, are the components that are required in lower amounts by poultry animals.

Fanatico (2003) reported that the easiest and most popular way to feed birds is to use pelleted feeds. Aside from the convenience to the farmer, pelleted feeds enable the bird to eat more at a time. In addition, some researchers also found improvement of feed conversion, decreased feed wastage, improved palatability and destruction of pathogens when birds were fed with pellet feed as compared to birds fed with mash feed.

Commercial manufacturing of pelleted feed usually involves a series of major processes including grinding, mixing and pelleting. The produced pellets are then tested as to pellet durability index (PDI) to determine quality. To enhance good health and growth, antibiotics are often added to the pelleted feed.

Researchers have concluded that smaller particle-sized feed will improve digestion due to the increased surface area for acid and enzyme digestion in the gastrointestinal tract. However, some researchers have recently brought to our attention the necessity of coarse particles for poultry feed to complement the natural design and function of the gastrointestinal tract (GIT). Hetland et al (2002) and Svihus et al. (2004) discussed that the GIT retention time decreased due to lack of gizzard function that eventually gave a negative impact on live performance. Zanotto & Bellaver (1996) compared the performance of 21-day-old broilers fed with different feed particle size; 0.716 mm and 1.196 mm. They found that the subject fed with larger particle size feed showed better performance. Parsons et al. (2006), evaluating different corn particle sizes in the broiler feed found that the largest particle size (2.242 mm) gave better feed intake than the other particle sizes tested (0.781, 0.950, 1.042 and 1.109 mm). Nir et al. (1994), however, argued that the development of broilers was influenced by changing particle sizes. However, variation in particle size between 0.5–1 mm usually did not have any effect on the broilers. Very fine particles (<0.5 mm) may impair the broilers performance due to the presence of dust that cause respiratory problems, increased water intake, feed presence in the drinkers and increased litter moisture. Chewning et al. (2012), in their recent study, concluded that although fine particle sizes (0.27 mm) enhanced broilers live performance, the pelleted feed did not.

All of this data shows that both fine and coarse particle sizes do have different functions in poultry feed. Appropriate proportions of these two ingredients must be used with respect to the live performance of the broilers. Xu et al. (2013) compared the performance of non-pelleted feed to pellets with fine particles and found that the addition of coarse particles improved feed conversion and body weight. Similar results were also obtained by other researchers like Auttawong et al. (2013) and Lin et al. (2013).

=== For livestock ===
Livestock includes beef cattle, dairy cattle, horses, goats, sheep and llamas. There is no specific requirement of feed intake for each livestock because their feed continuously varies based on the animals' age, sex, breed, environment, etc. However, basic nutrient requirements of a livestock's feed must consist of protein, carbohydrates, vitamins and minerals.

Dairy cattle need more energy in their feed than other types of cattle. Studies have shown that energy supplied by feed is provided by various carbohydrate sources, including non-fiber carbohydrates (NFC) such as fermentable feeds or neutral detergent fiber (NDF) such as forage. Feeds with high NDF are good for rumen health, however, they provide less energy and vice versa. Fats are added in the livestock feed to increase energy concentration, especially when the NFC content is already too high since excessive NFC lessens the NDF fraction, affecting the rumen digestion. In ruminants, most proteins consumed are broken down by microorganisms and the microorganisms later get digested by the small intestine.

The National Research Council suggested that the crude protein required in livestock feed should be less than 7%. Lactating ruminants, especially dairy cattle require the highest amount of protein, especially for milk synthesis. Minerals including calcium, phosphorus and selenium are required by livestock for maintaining growth, reproduction and bone health.

Like other animals, livestock also require appropriate proportions of fine and coarse particles in their feed. Theoretically, finer particles will be easier to digest in the rumen, however the presence of coarse particles might increase the amount of starch entering the small intestine, thus increasing energetic efficiency.

Livestock could be fed by grazing on grasslands, integrated or non-integrated with crop production. Livestock produced in stalls or feedlots are landless and are typically fed by processed feed containing veterinary drugs, growth hormones, feed additives, or nutraceuticals to improve production. Similarly, livestock consume grains as the main feed or as a supplement to the forage based feed. Processing grains for feed is aimed at getting the easiest digestible grains to maximize starch availability, thus increasing the energy supply.

Hutjens (1999) reported that milk performance was significantly better when the cattle were fed with ground corn. A study compared the digestibility of various corn particle sizes and distribution and concluded that to have 80% digestibility, a particle size of 0.5 mm should be used (for 16 hr incubation).

A research team from the University of Maryland and the USDA studied the development, fermentation in rumen and starch digestion sites in dairy cow feeding on corn grain from different harvests and differently processing, and concluded that digestion, metabolism and heat energy were higher for high moisture corn compared to dry corn. Grinding increased DMI and resulted in increased yields of milk, protein, lactose and non-fat solids.

== Manufacturing process ==
Depending on the type of feed, the manufacturing process usually start with the grinding process. Figure 1 illustrates the workflow for general feed manufacturing process. Grinding of selected raw material is to produce particle sizes to be optimally and easily accepted by the animals. Depending on the formulation, feed could contain up to 10 different components including carbohydrate, protein, vitamins, minerals and additives. The feed ration can be pelleted by proportionally homogenizing the specific compositions. Pelleting is achieved by various methods, but the most common means is by extrusion. Formula and feed making machine are very important during the entire process of the feed production to ensure quality feed.

== Grain milling for feed preparations ==
Corn, sorghum, wheat and barley are the most used cereals in the preparation of feed for the livestock, poultry, swine, and fish industry. Roller and hammer mills are the two types of processing equipment generally used to grind grains into smaller particle sizes.

Milling cereal grains by mechanical action involves several forces like compression, shearing, crushing, cutting, friction and collision. The particle size of the ground cereal is very important in the animal feed production; smaller particle sizes increase the number of particles and the surface area per unit volume which increase access to digestive enzymes. Other benefits are increased ease of handling and easier mixing of ingredients. The average particle size is given as geometric mean diameter (GMD), expressed in mm or microns (μm) and the range of variation is described by geometric standard deviation (GSD), with a larger GSD representing lower uniformity.

According to Lucas (2004), GMD and GSD are accurate descriptors of particle size distribution when the particle size distribution is expressed as log data, and are distributed log normally. Studies have shown that grinding different grains with the same mill under similar conditions results in products with different particle sizes. The hardness of a grain sample is related to the percentage of fine particles obtained after grinding, with a higher percentage of fine particles from lower hardness grains.

Rose et al. (2001) discussed that hard endosperm produces irregularly-shaped larger particles, while soft endosperm produces smaller size particles. The correlation between particle size and energy consumed is although not positive but, to obtain very fine particle sizes require higher energy which reduces the rate of production. Moreover, a very fine grind of grain has no impact on the efficiency of pelleting, nor on the power consumed during pelleting. Amerah et al. (2007) discussed the availability of more data suggesting grain particle sizes are very important in mashed diets than in pelleted diets.

== Gallery ==
Processed animal feed rations

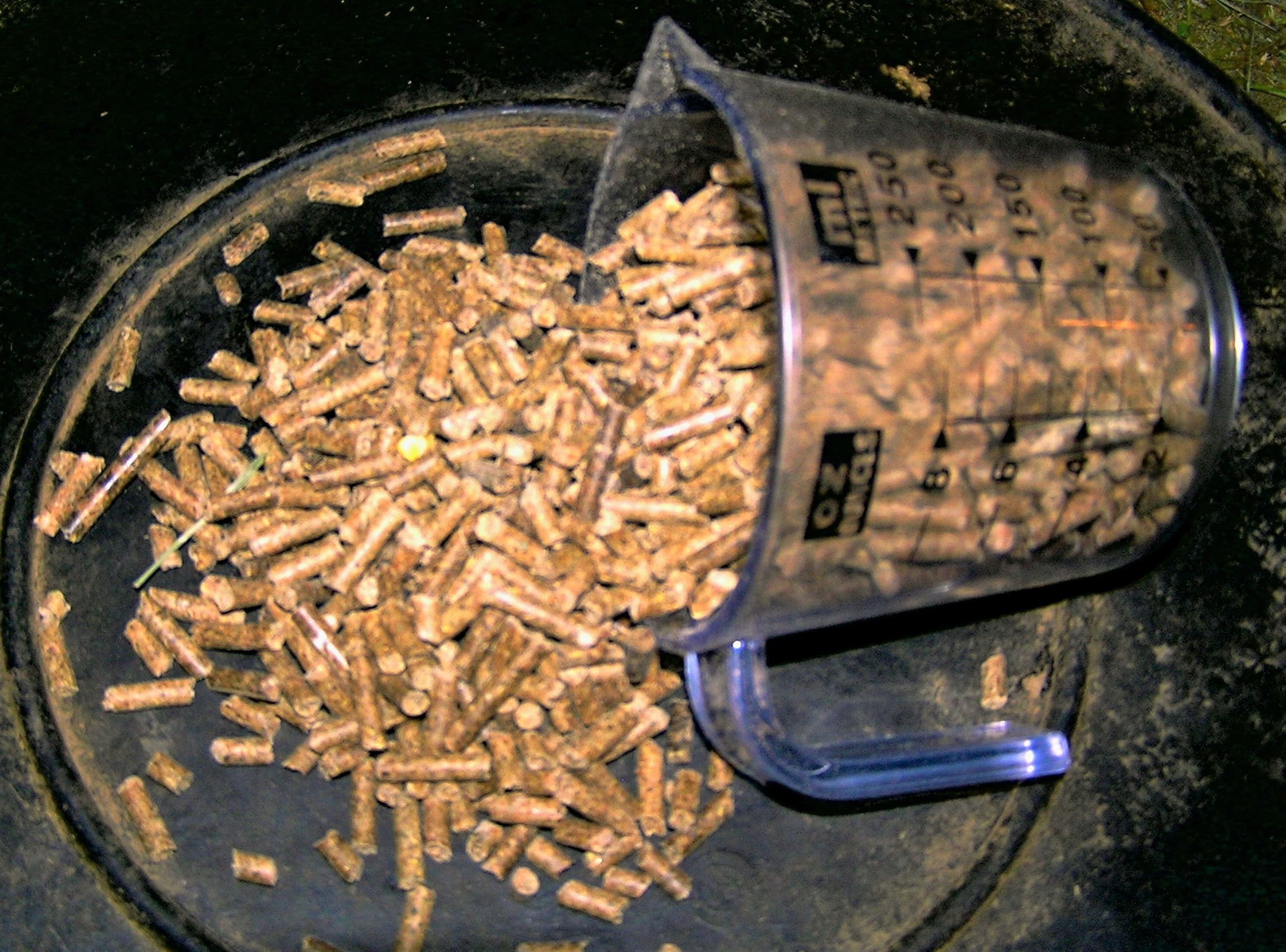
A manufactured pelleted feed ration for horses

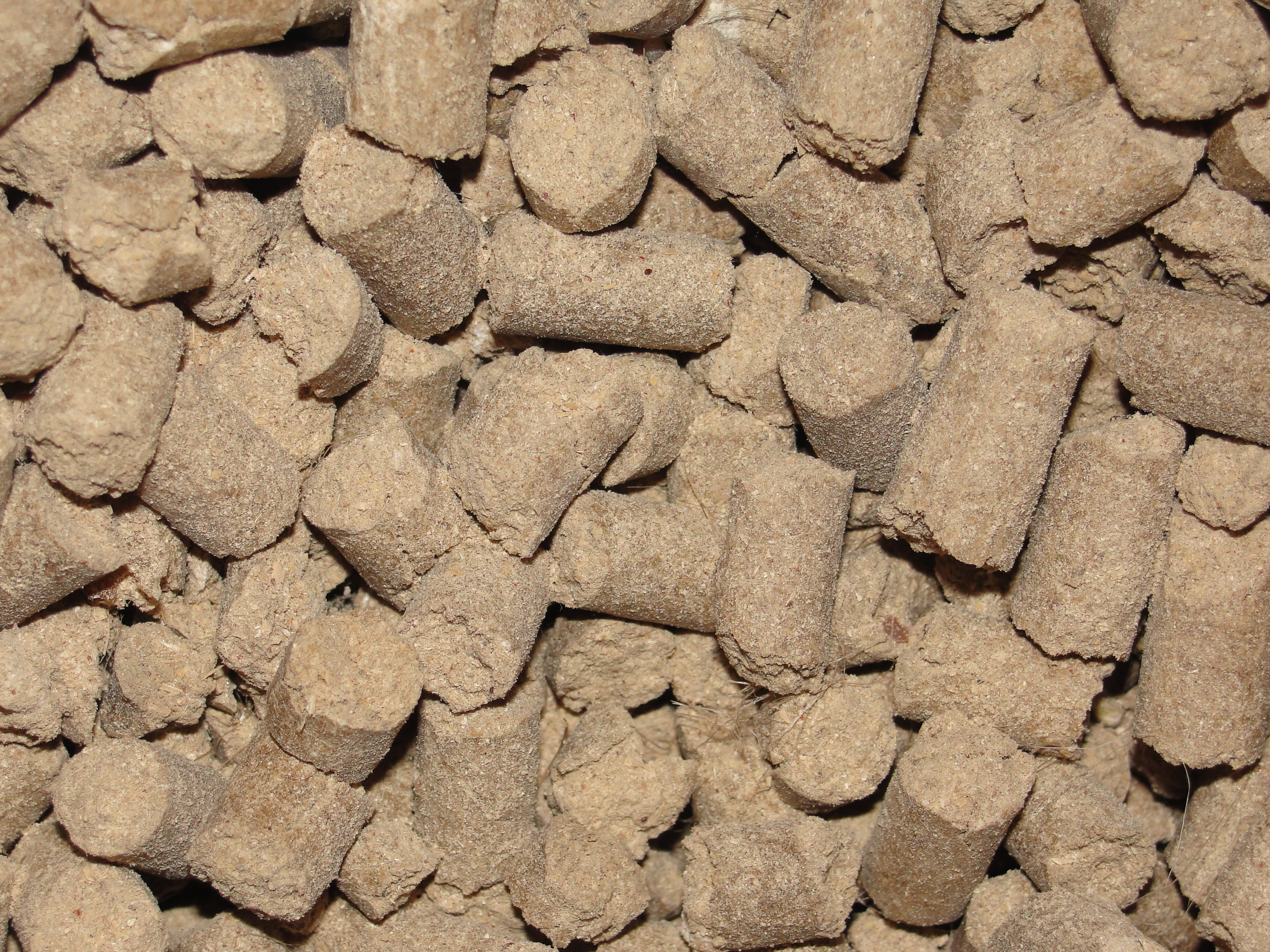
Manufactured pelleted feed ration for cattle

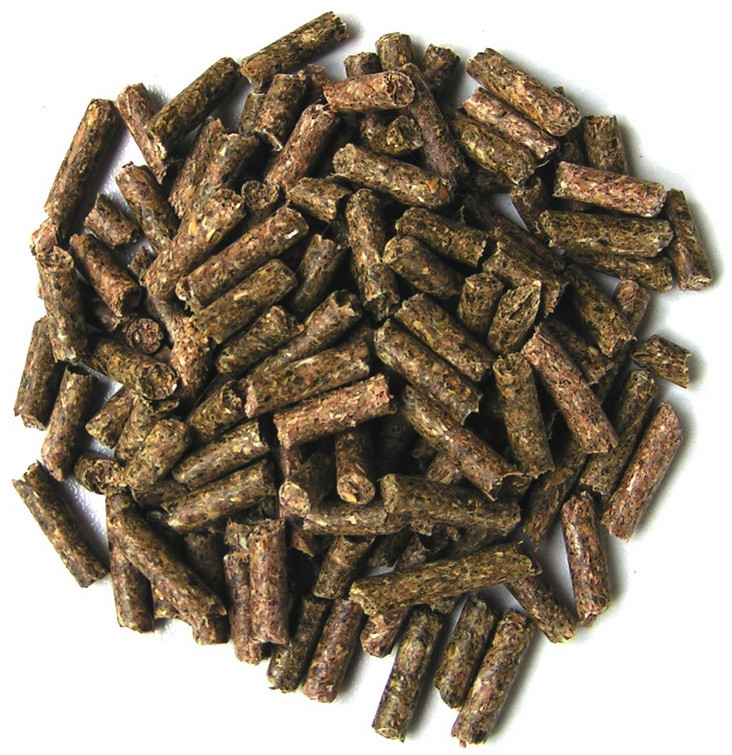
Manufactured pelleted feed ration for rabbits

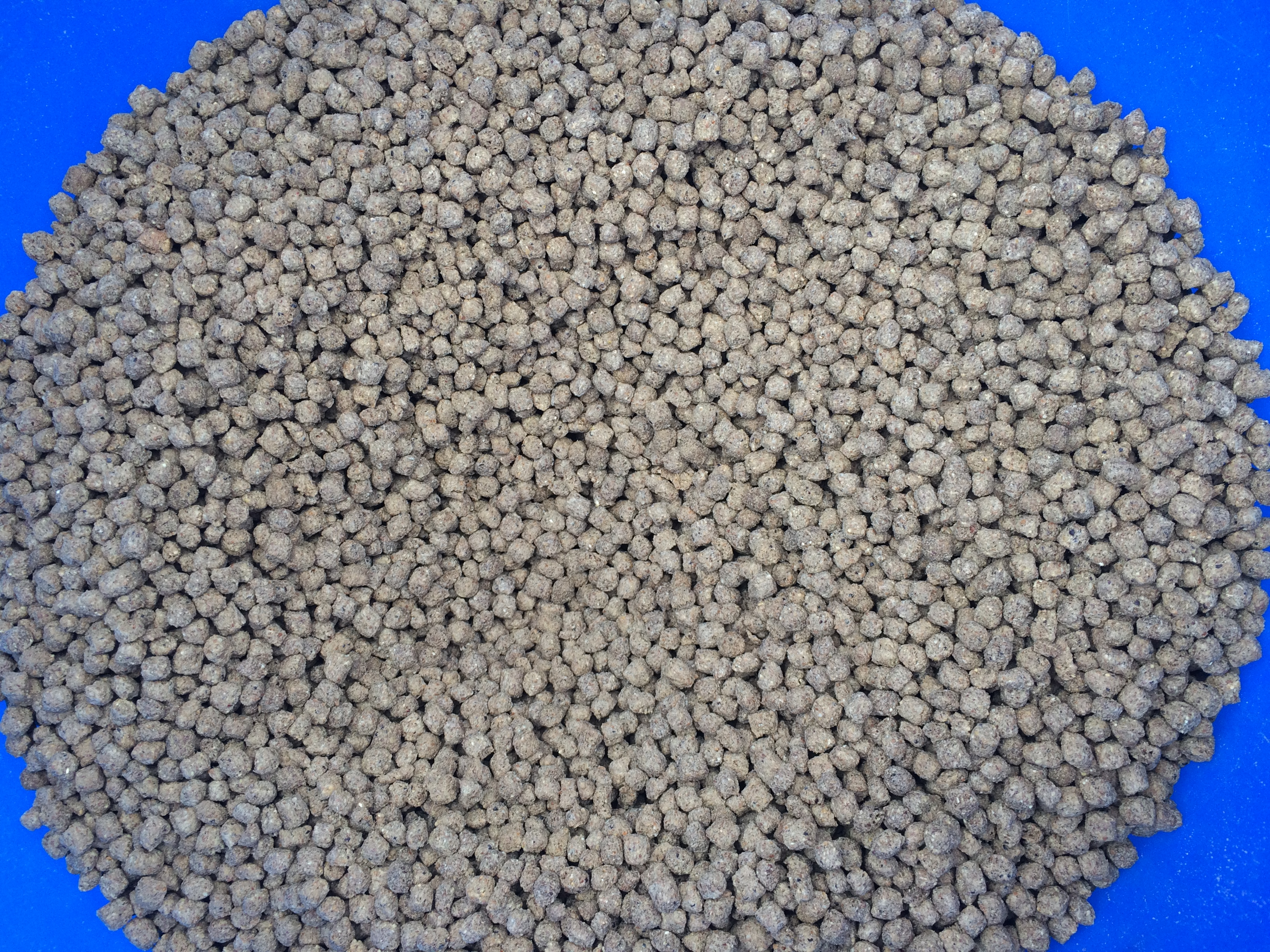
Manufactured pelleted feed ration for fish

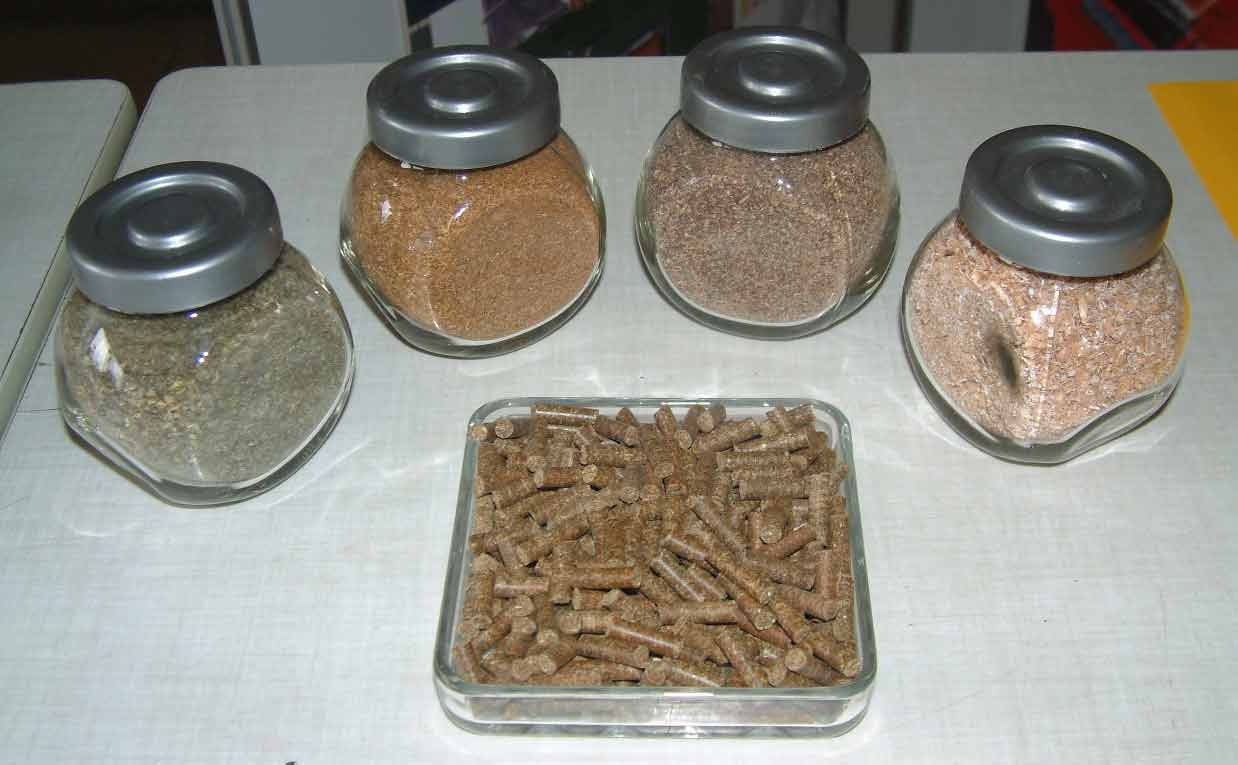
Several manufactured pelleted feed rations for horses

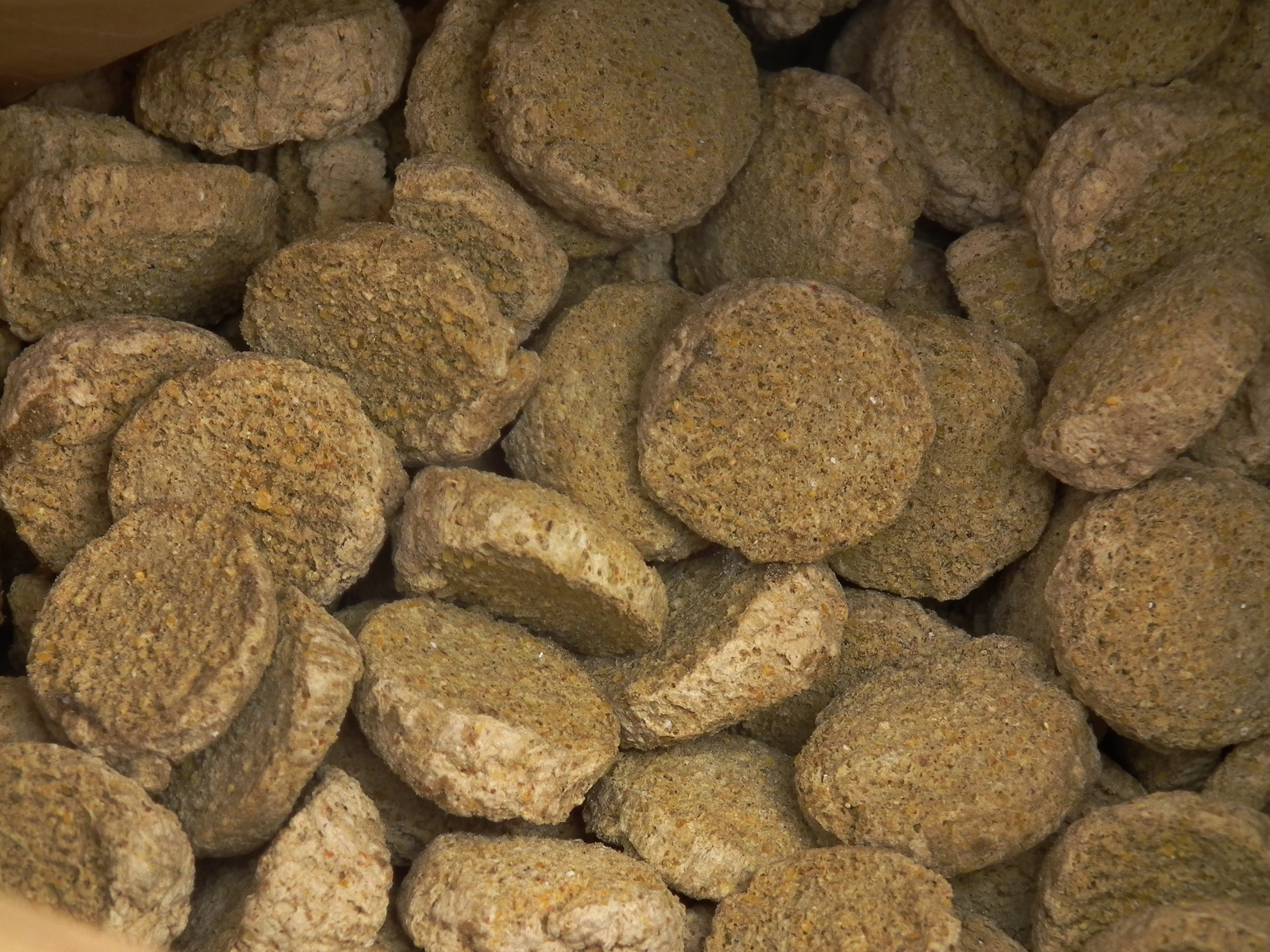
Another manufactured pelleted feed ration for horses

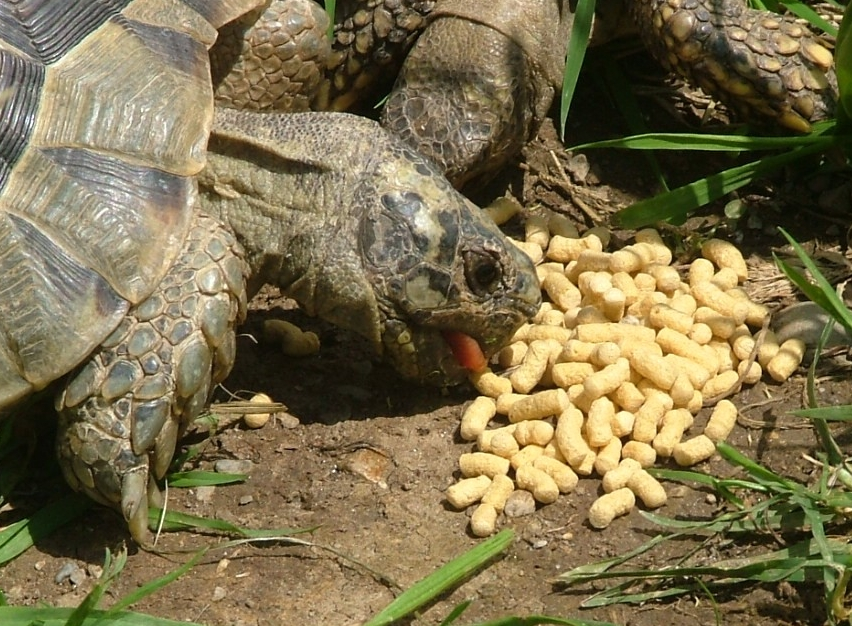
Manufactured pelleted feed ration for turtles

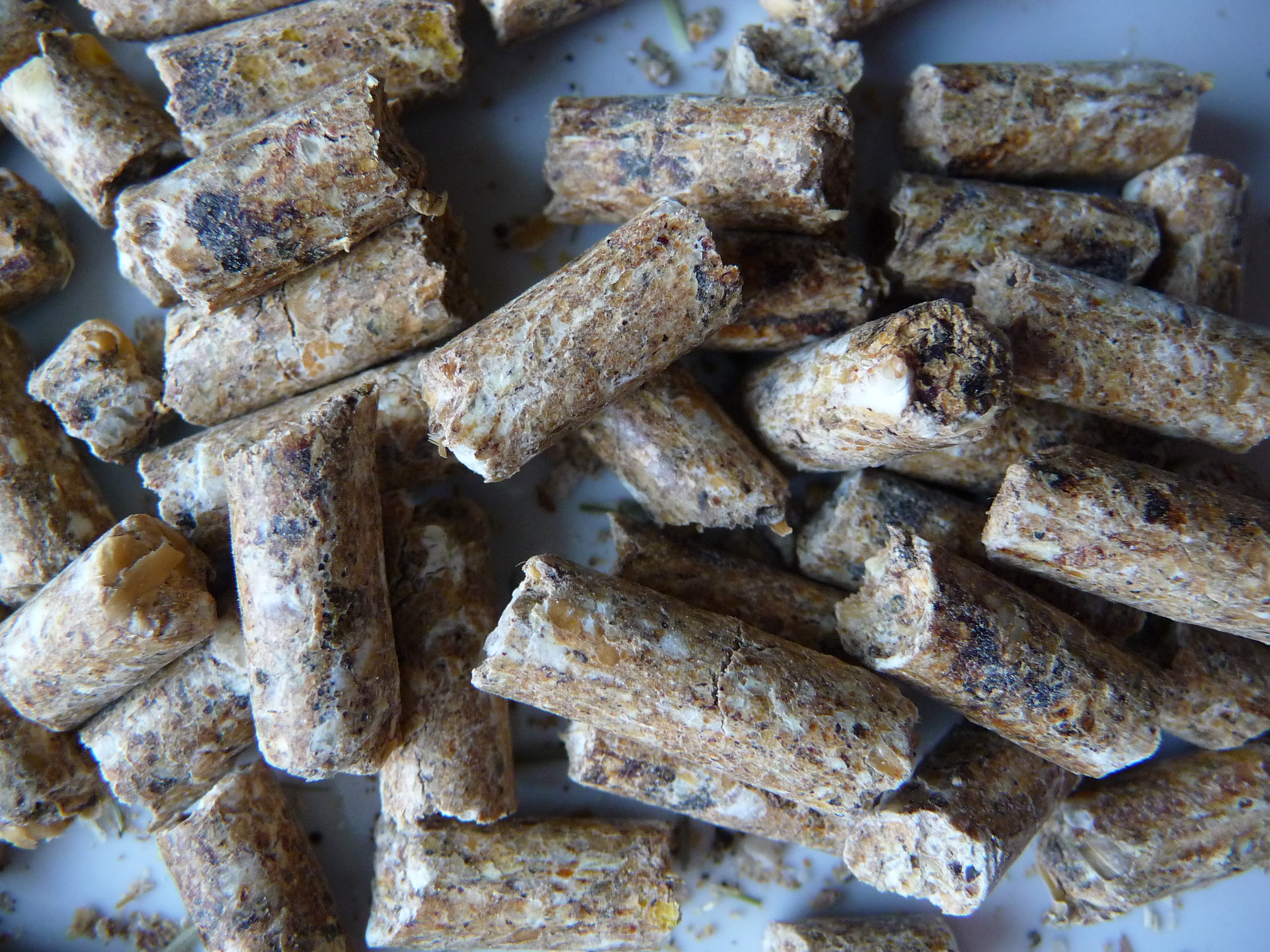
Manufactured pelleted feed ration for sheep and goats

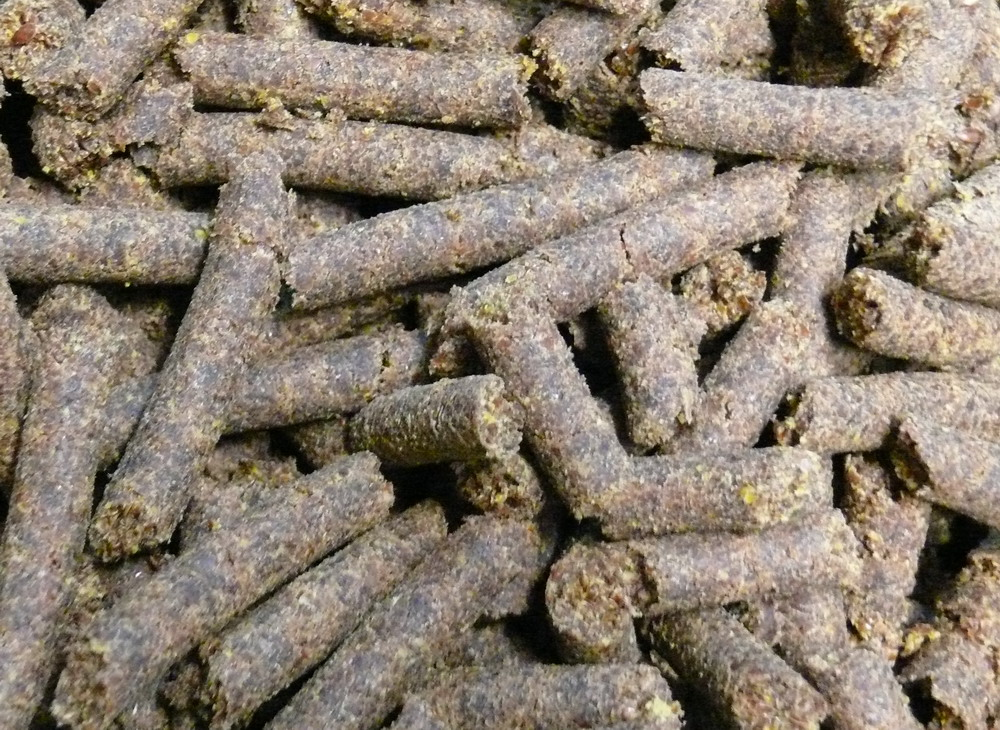
Manufactured (pressed, after oil extraction) pelleted feed ration made from the flax plant

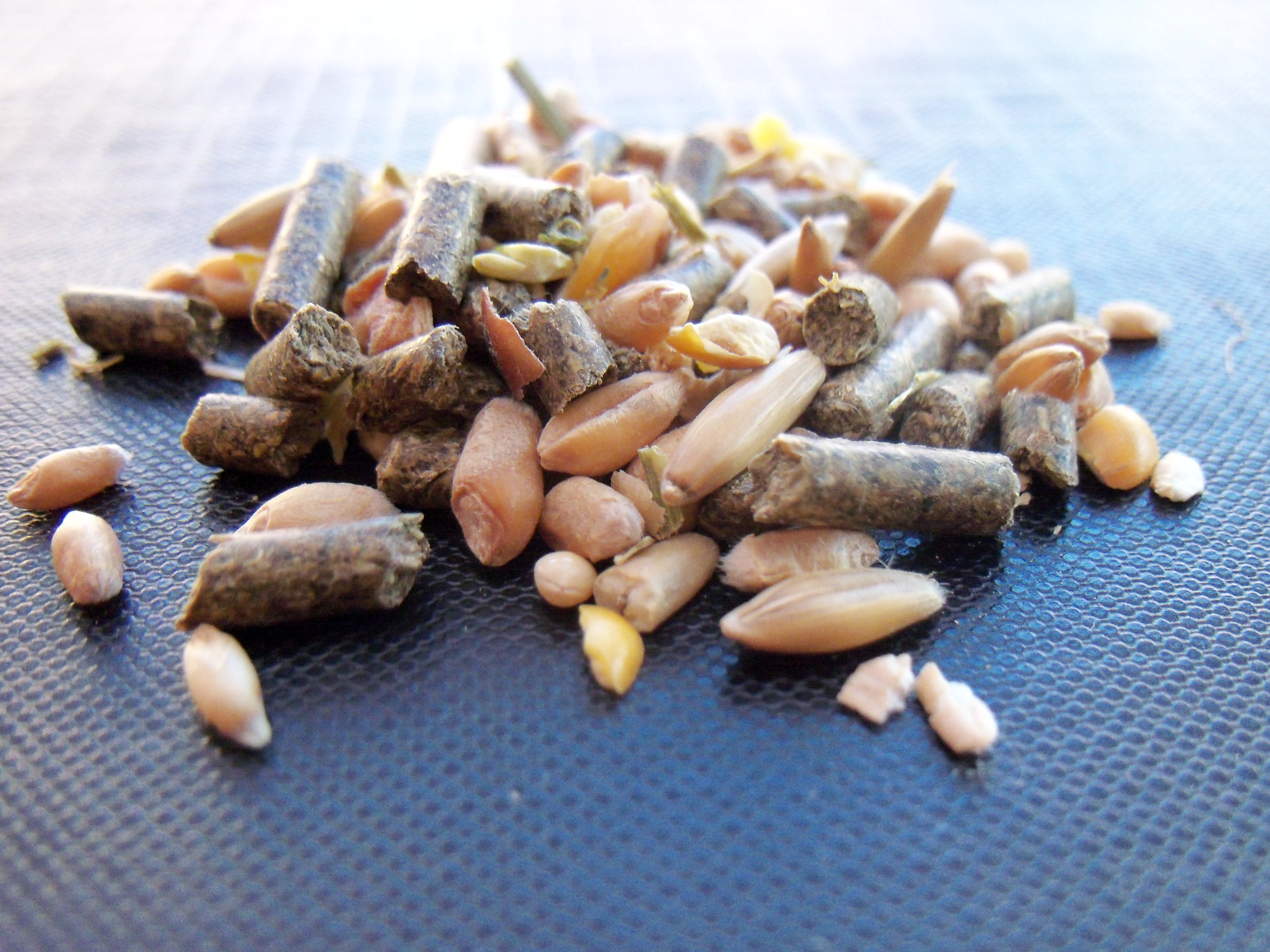
Mix of seed and manufactured pellets for animal feed

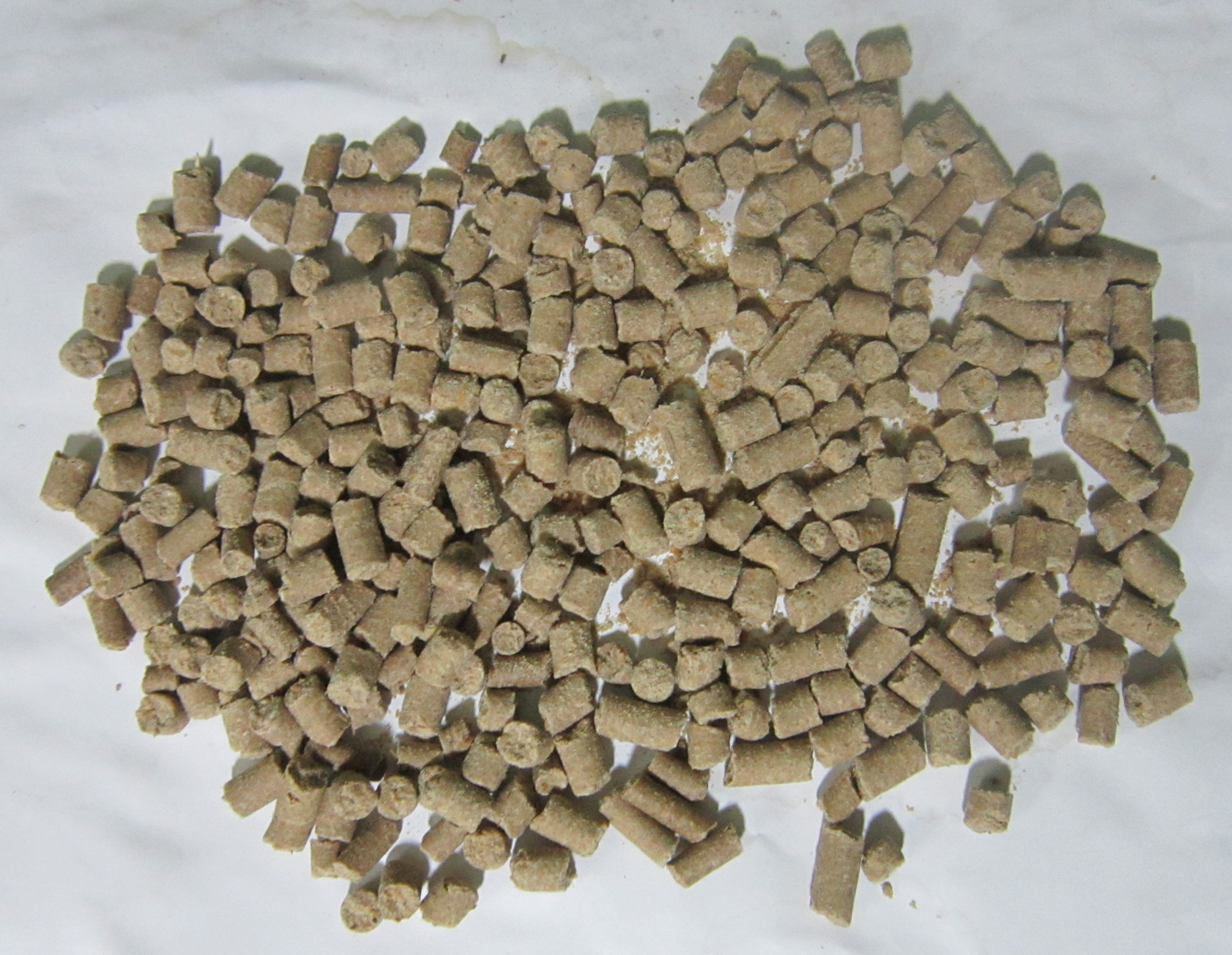
Rice bran pellets

== Sources ==
- Amerah, A.M.; Ravindran, V.; Lentle, R.G.; Thomas, D.G. (2007). "Feed particle size: Implications on the digestion and performance of poultry". World's Poultry Science Journal. 63 (3): 439–445. doi:10.1017/s0043933907001560. S2CID 83772532.
- ASAE (1983). "Method of determining and expressing fineness of feed materials by sieving. American Society of Agricultural Engineers Standard S319.2.". Yearbook of Standards. St. Joseph, MO: American Society of Agricultural Engineers.
- Auttawong, S.; Brake, J.; Stark, C.; Yahav, S. (2013). "Time-limited feeding of grower feed negates the effects of corn particle size, dietary energy level, and post-pellet liquid fat application on broiler live performance from 14 to 28 days of age". Poultry Science. 92 (ESuppl. 1): 32.
- Benedetti, M.P.; Sartori, J.R.; Carvalho, F.B.; Pereira, L.A.; Fascina, V.B.; Stradiotti, A.C.; Pezzato, A.; Costa, C; Ferreira, J.G. (2011). "Corn texture and particle size in broiler diets". Rev. Bras. Cienc. Avic. 13 (4): 227–234. doi:10.1590/S1516-635X2011000400002. hdl:11449/18021.
- Bregendahl, K. (2008). "Use of Distillers Co-products in Diets Fed to Poultry" (PDF). Using Distillers Grains in the U.S. and International Livestock and Poultry Industries. Midwest Agribusiness Trade Research and Information Center at the Center for Agricultural and Rural Development, Iowa State University. pp. 99–133. Archived from the original (PDF) on 2013-05-03.
- Carre, B.; Muley, N.; Gomez, J.; Ouryt, F.X.; Lafittee, E.; Guillou, D.; Signoret, C. (2005). "Soft wheat instead of hard wheat in pelleted diets results in high starch digestibility in broiler chickens". British Poultry Science. 46 (1): 66–74. doi:10.1080/00071660400023847. PMID 15835254. S2CID 22087947.
- Chewning, C.G.; Stark, C.R.; Brake, J. (2012). "Effects of particle size and feed form on broiler performance". Journal of Applied Poultry Research. 21 (4): 830–837. doi:10.3382/japr.2012-00553.
- Chiba, L.I. (2014). "Poultry nutrition and feeding" (PDF). Animal Nutrition Handbook. pp. 410–425.
- Fanatico, A. (10 January 2003). "Feeding Chickens for best health and performance". National Center for Appropriate Technology (NCAT).
- FDA (2015). "Hazard Analysis Critical Control Point (HACCP)". Department of Health and Human Services, Food and Drug Administration. Archived from the original on September 16, 2013.
- FDA (2014). "FDA 101: Animal Feed". Department of Health and Human Services, Food and Drug Administration. Archived from the original on June 14, 2009.
- Hetland, H.; Svihus, B.; Olaisen, V. (2002). "Effect of feeding whole cereals on performance, starch digestibility and duodenal particle size distribution in broiler chickens". British Poultry Science. 43 (3): 416–423. doi:10.1080/00071660120103693. PMID 12195801. S2CID 20981237.
- Herdt, T.H. (October 2014). "Nutritional Requirements of Dairy Cattle".
- Hutjens, M.F. (1999). "Ration physical form and rumen health". Four-State Dairy Management Seminar Proceedings. pp. 1–3.
- Hutjens, M.; Dann, H. Grain Processing: Is It Too Coarse or Too Fine?. Department of Animal Sciences University of Illinois.
- Klasing, K.C. (May 2015). "Nutritional Requirements of Poultry".
- Koch, K. (1996). Hammermills and rollermills. Feed Manufacturing. Vol. MF-2048. Department of Grain Science and Industry, Kansas State University.
- Lalman, D (15 January 2020). "Nutrient Requirements of Beef Cattle" (PDF). Division of Agricultural Sciences and Natural Resources, Oklahoma State University.
- Luce, W.G. (2013). Formulating Swine Rations. ANSI-3501. Oklahoma Cooperative Extension Service, Division of Agricultural Sciences and Natural Resources, Oklahoma State University.
- Lucas, G.M. (2004). Dental Functional Morphology. Cambridge, UK: Cambridge University Press.
- Lin, Y.M.; Stark, C.R; Brake, J. (2013). "Effect of a severely restricted feed program at the onset of lay and corn particle size on performance of three weight classes of broiler breeders". Poultry Science. 92 (E-Suppl. 1): 63.
- Martin, S. (1985). Comparison of hammer mill and roller mill grinding and the effect of grain particle size on mixing and pelleting (Master's Thesis). Kansas: Kansas State University.
- Myer, R.O.; Brendemuhl, J.H. (2013). 4H Project Guide: Swine Nutrition. Vol. 4H22. Animal Sciences Department, Florida Cooperative Extension Service, Institute of Food and Agricultural Sciences, University of Florida. pp. 1–2.
- National Research Council (1994). Nutrient Requirements for Poultry. Vol. 1 (9th ed.). Washington, DC: National Academy of Science.
- Nir, I.; Hillel, R.; Shefet, G.; Nitzan, Z (1994). "Effect of grain particle size on performance". Poultry Science. 73 (6): 781–791. doi:10.3382/ps.0730781. PMID 8072920.
- Nir, I.; Ptichi, I. (2001). "Feed particle size and hardness: Influence on performance, nutritional, behavioral and metabolic aspects". Proceedings of the 1st World Feed Conference, Utrecht, the Netherlands. pp. 157–186.
- NOAA Fisheries (2015). "Feeds for Aquaculture. National Oceanic and Atmospheric Administration".
- n.a. (2000). Nutrient Requirements of Beef Cattle (Seventh Revised ed.). Washington, D.C.: National Academy Press.
- Oguntimein, G.B. "Processing cassava for animal feeds". Cassava as livestock feed in Africa. Proceedings of the IITA/ILCA/University of Ibadan Workshop on the Potential Utilization of Cassava as Livestock Feed in Africa 14-18 November 1988, Ibadan, Nigeria. International Institute of Tropical Agriculture.
- Parsons, A.S.; Buchanan, N.P.; Blemings, K.P.; Wilson, M.E.; Moritz, J.S. (2006). "Effect of corn particle size and pellet texture on broiler performance in the growing phase". Journal of Applied Poultry Research. 15 (2): 245–255. doi:10.1093/japr/15.2.245.
- Preston, C.M.; McCracken, K.J; McAllister, A. (2000). "Effect of diet form and enzyme supplementation on growth, efficiency and energy utilisation of wheat-based diets for broilers". British Poultry Science. 41 (3): 324–331. doi:10.1080/713654933. PMID 11081428. S2CID 34910647.
- Rayburn, E.B. (September 2009). "Nutrient Requirements for Beef Cattle" (PDF). West Virginia University. Archived from the original (PDF) on 2012-09-07.
- Rick, J. (1995). Practical Swine Feeding Ideas. Vol. Bulletin 854 (Revised May 1995 ed.). The University of Georgia College of Agricultural & Environmental Sciences Cooperative Extension Service.
- Rose, S.P.; Tucker, L.A.; Kettlewell, P.S.; Collier, J.D.A. (2001). "Rapid tests of wheat nutritive value for growing chickens". Journal of Cereal Science. 34 (2): 181–190. doi:10.1006/jcrs.2001.0390.
- Secrist, D.S.; Hill, W.J.; Owens, F.N.; Welty, S.D. "Effect of corn particle size on feedlot steer performance and carcass characteristics. Research Report" (PDF). Oklahoma State University. Archived from the original (PDF) on 2010-06-24.
- Silbergeld, E.K.; Jay, G.; Price, L.B. (2008). "Industrial food animal production, antimicrobial resistance, and human health". Annual Review of Public Health. 29: 151–169. doi:10.1146/annurev.publhealth.29.020907.090904. PMID 18348709.
- Svihus, B.; Klozstad, K.H.; Perez, V.; Zimonja, O.; Sahlstorm, S; Schuller, R.B. (2004). "Physical and nutritional effects of pelleting of broiler chicken diets made from wheat ground to different coarsenesses by the use of roller mill and hammer mill". Animal Feed Science and Technology. 117 (3–4): 281–293. doi:10.1016/j.anifeedsci.2004.08.009.
- Stein, H.H. (2007). "Recommendations on Feeding DDGS to Swine". The Pigs Site.
- TAC (2011). Texas Administrative Code Title 4. Agriculture Chapter 61, Commercial Feed Rules. Adopted by the Texas Feed and Fertilizer Control Service under the Texas Agriculture Code (1981). Amended May 19, 2011, pp. 5.
- U.S. Grains Council (2012). "Chapter 21-Use of DDGS in Swine Diets" (PDF). A Guide to Distiller's Dried Grains with Solubles (DDGS) (3rd ed.). p. 1. Archived from the original (PDF) on 2016-04-07.
- Waldroup, P. W. (1997). Particle Size Reduction of Cereal Grains and its Significance in Poultry Nutrition Technical Bulletin PO34-1997. American Soybean Association.
- "Commercial Feed License, Pet Food Registration and Inspection Fee Reporting". Washington State Department of Agriculture. 2016. Archived from the original on 2019-02-20.
- Xu, Y.; Stark, C.; Ferket, P.; Brake, J. (2013). "Effect of roller mill ground corn inclusion and floor types on gastric development, liver performance, and litter moisture in broilers". Poultry Science. 92 (E-Suppl. 1): 65.
- Zanotto, D.L.; Bellaver, C. (1996). Método de determinação da granulometria para uso em rações de suínos e aves. Concórdia: EMBRAPA.
