= Fefana =

Fefana or FEFANA may refer to:

- Fefana, Hanumangarh, Rajasthan, a village in Rajasthan, India
- Phephna, a village in Uttar Pradesh, India
  - Phephana (Assembly constituency)
- FEFANA, the EU Association of Specialty Feed Ingredients and their Mixtures
