= Appetein =

Appetein or APC-Appetein is a processed granulated plasma and serum blend ingredient for animal feeds.

== See also ==
- Compound feed
