= Brewer's spent grain =

Food waste in the brewing industry

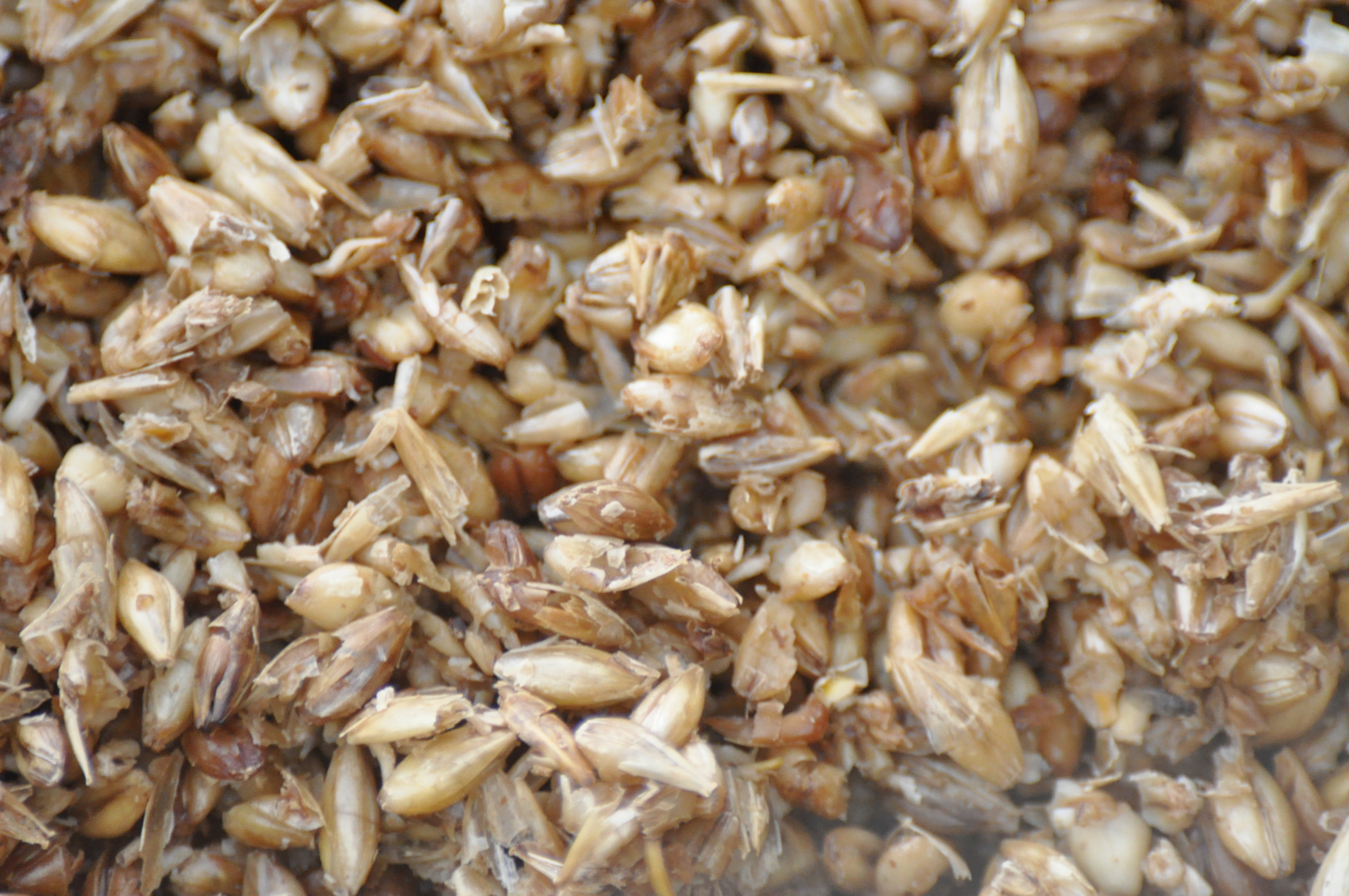
Spent grain from brewing.

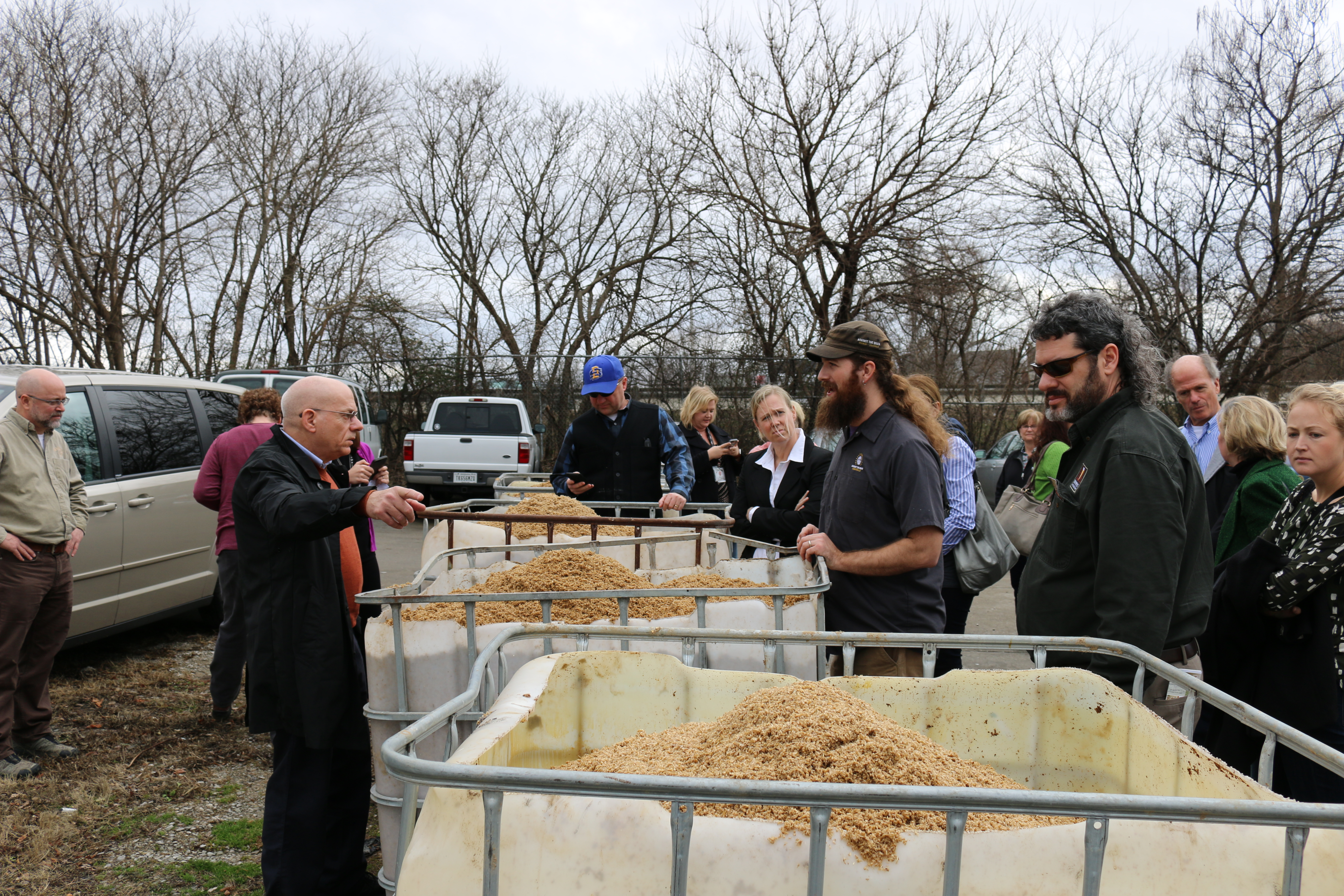
Containers of spent grain outside the brewery.

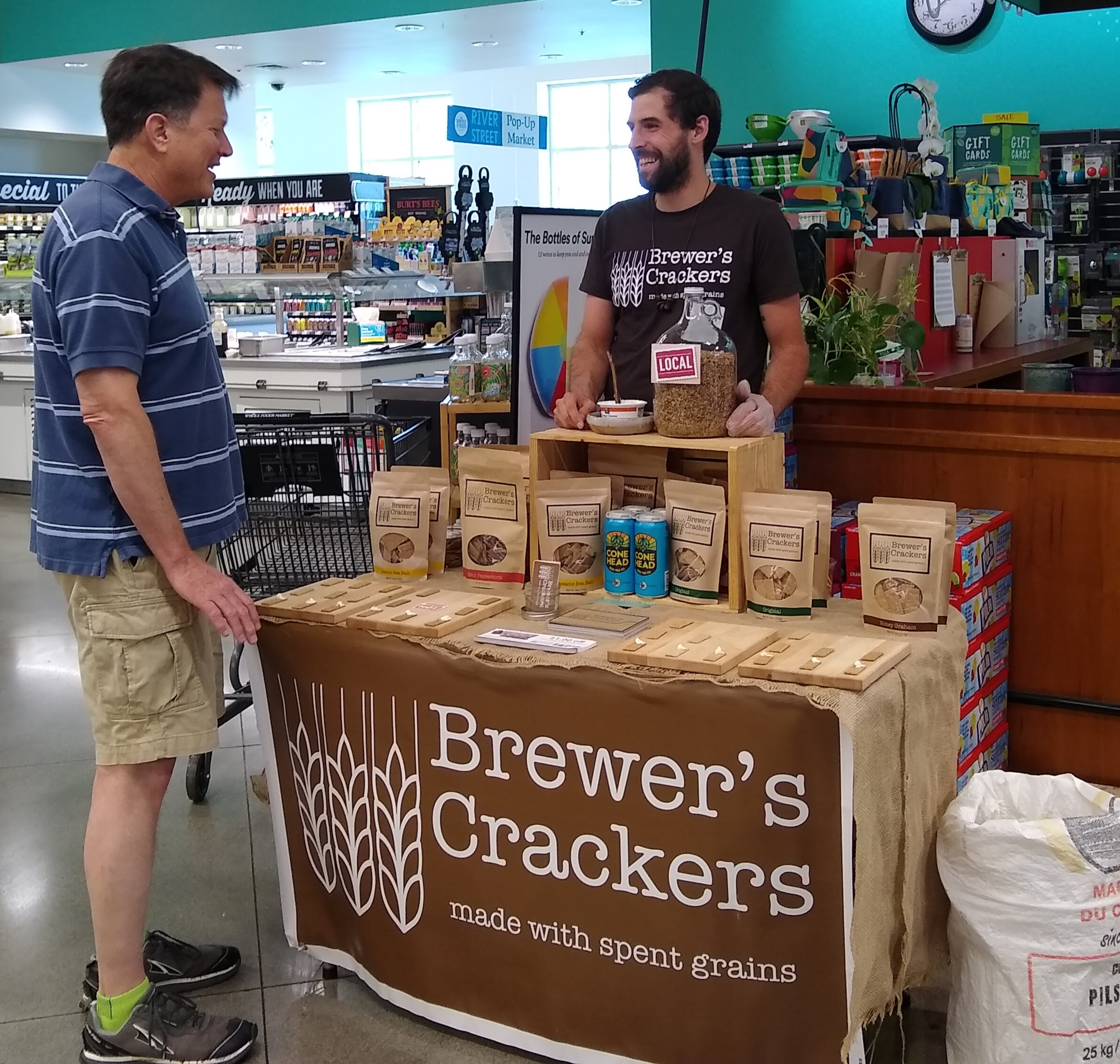
A product demonstration of crackers made from spent grain at a local supermarket.

Brewer's spent grain (BSG) or draff is a food waste that is a byproduct of the brewing industry. It makes up 85 percent of brewing waste. BSG is obtained as a mostly solid residue after wort production in the brewing process. The product is initially wet, with a short shelf-life, but can be dried and processed in various ways to preserve it.

Because spent grain is widely available wherever beer is consumed and is frequently available at a low cost, many potential uses for this waste have been suggested and studied as a means of reducing its environmental impact, such as use as a food additive, animal feed, fertilizer or paper.

== Composition ==
The majority of BSG is composed of barley malt grain husks in combination with parts of the pericarp and seed coat layers of the barley. Though the composition of BSG can vary, depending on the type of barley used, the way it was grown, and other factors, BSG is usually rich in cellulose, hemicelluloses, lignin, and protein. BSG is also naturally high in fiber, making it of great interest as a food additive, replacing low-fiber ingredients.

== Food additive ==
The high protein and fiber content of BSG makes it an obvious target to add to human foods. BSG can be ground and then sifted into a powder that can increase fiber and protein content while decreasing caloric content, possibly replacing flour in baked goods and other foods, such as breadsticks, cookies, and even hot dogs. Some breweries that also operate restaurants re-use their BSG in recipes, such as in pizza crust. Grainstone is an Australian based company that has developed a world leading modular energy efficient process to convert BSG to a premium specialty flour and a process to produce nutraceuticals; including protein isolate, soluble dietary fibre and antioxident.

== Livestock feed ==
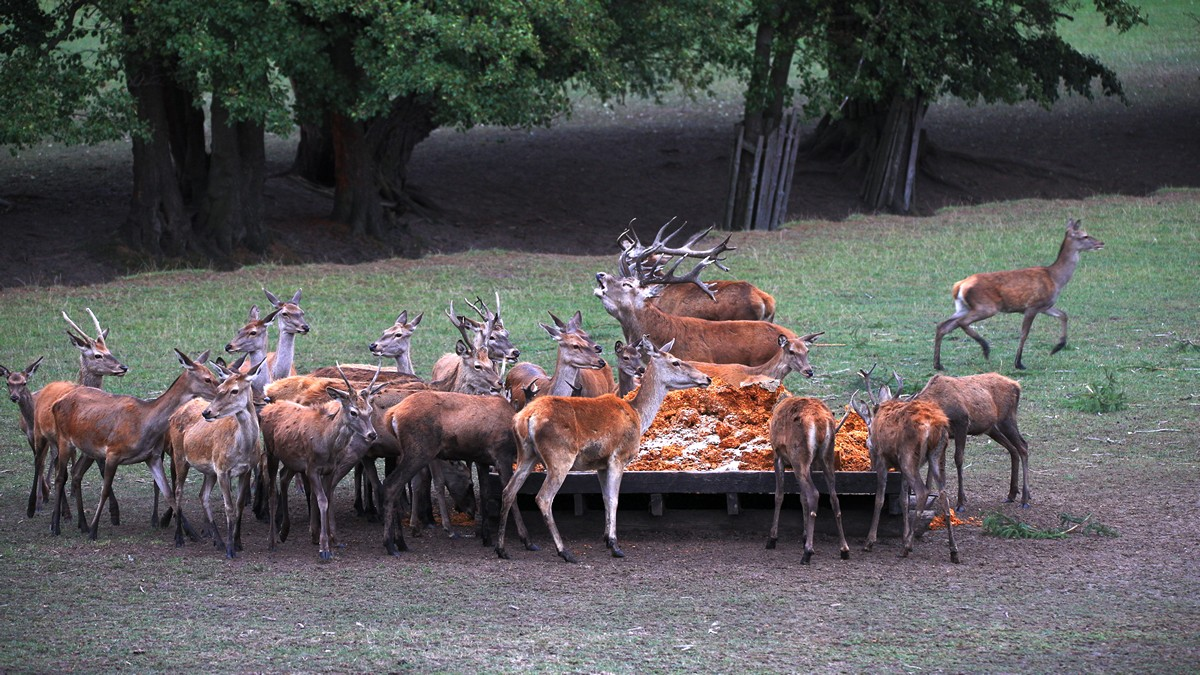
Deer in Germany being fed BSG.

The low cost and high availability of BSG has led to its use as livestock feed. BSG can be fed to livestock immediate in its wet stage or once processed and dried. The high protein content in BSG offers a wide variety of amino acids essential in the diet of livestock. In fact, supplementing BSG in cow diets may increase milk yield, milk total solids content, and milk fat yield, when compared to maize.

== Fertilizer ==
BSG may be an effective, affordable soil amendment for agricultural purposes. Its high protein content translates to high nitrogen availability in soils, which could be ideal for many common crops such as beets, spinach, kale, and onions. In combination with compost, BSG may improve germination rate and the availability of organic matter in soil. Studies have shown that BSG in addition to compost has a stronger, positive effect on germination than compost alone. An additional study has shown that the inclusion of BSG in soil is more effective at sodic soil reclamation and corn seed germination than gypsum, which is traditionally used in sodic soils.

== Ceramics ==
Brewery's spent grains could be recycled through their incorporation in a traditional ceramic paste used in the manufacture of common bricks. This incorporation affects the mechanical strength, porosity, and thermal conductivity of the ceramic material.

== Mushroom Substrate ==
Both completely dried BSG, and fresh BSG (with an average ~79% water content) have successfully been utilized in small home and small commercial mushroom substrate production. Additional, alternative sources of lignin from coffee, soft wood pine/douglas fir sawdust, and harder wood sawdust (in pellet form as well) have been shown to help in mushroom production block manufacturing. These industrial byproducts may offer less expensive material costs in block production as well as a higher level of waste reuse in mushroom production.

The highest average yield (there are many growing factors involved) was found to be with a ratio of fuel pellet : BSG : hot tap water of 450 : 725 : 825 (all measured in grams in the study per each T3 filter patch bag utilized for the production blocks), with testing for field capacity being a final assessment of fine tuning these ratios (to get a 'feel' for proper hydration, by experienced block producers, via hand compression testing of a hydrated and mixed batch of substrate.)

== See also ==
- Dietary fiber
