= American Feed Industry Association =

The American Feed Industry Association (AFIA) is a not-for-profit organization that represents the feed industry in industry-wide events, national and state legislation, etc. Members of the AFIA include livestock feed manufacturers, ingredient suppliers, pet food manufacturers, supplier companies, regional and state associations, and international firms.

The AFIA currently has over 550 members including the U.S. Poultry & Egg Association and the United Soybean Board. The AFIA collaborates with associations and organizations such as the Association of American Feed Control Officials and the Institute for Feed Education & Research.

== Foundation ==
By 1909 thirty states had already developed individual feed regulations. The separate laws highlighted the need for a national feed law, which would help create uniformity between state regulations and encourage inter-state commerce. Recognizing the need for a trade association to strengthen and represent the feed industry in the development of these regulations, A.G. Winter and W.R. Anderson invited feed manufacturers to an industry-wide organizational meeting on March 26, 1909, in Chicago. Editor for Flour & Feed magazine, G.D. Simonds, urged these manufacturers to join in the creation of an industry association; thus, in the 1909 industry meeting, eighteen feed manufacturers came together to create the bylaws for the American Feed Manufacturer's Association (AFMA).,

As members of the Association diversified, the American Feed Manufacturer's Association evolved into the American Feed Industry Association (AFIA), officially changing the name in 1985.

== Goals and mission ==
The AFIA provides representation and support for legislative and regulatory issues concerning the feed industry on a state, national, and global platform. Additionally, the AFIA aims to provide educational outreach, training, and networking services to the industry, its members, and members' communities. The AFIA is committed to leading the American feed industry in producing safe and reliable food.

== Services ==
The AFIA monitors state and federal legislative and regulatory actions and takes a proactive approach in addressing issues that impact its membership. The AFIA represents member interests in legislation, and keep members up to date and informed on relevant issues such as production standards, food safety, commodity and international trade, etc.

The Association sponsors educational seminars and workshops throughout the year, contributes to agricultural research that contributes to food safety and security, and organizes a number of recognized industry conventions to foster industry-wide communication.

== Programs ==
=== Safe Feed/Safe Food Certification ===
Safe Feed/ Safe Food (SF/SF) Certification is a voluntary program that establishes standards, in addition to existing regulations, to promote feed safety and reduce risk. SF/SF is an extension of the AFIA's commitment to safe feed and encourages members to continuously improve existing safety regimes. SF/SF is a third-party certification program that is recognized by the Food and Drug Administration (FDA) as a model program in producing safe feed. Over three hundred facilities have been certified under the AFIA's SF/SF Certification Program. The AFIA launched this third-party certification program in 2004. With the tightening of the Food Safety Modernization Act (FSMA), these third-party certification programs will become increasingly significant in meeting the strict government standards.

=== International Safe Feed/Safe Food Certification Program ===
The International Safe Feed/Safe Food Certification Program (ISF/SF) expands upon the principles and standards of the domestic SF/SF. This certification program is recognized by European Commission and The Feed Additives and Pre-Mixtures Association, a European feed association. The ISF/SF program was launched by the AFIA in 2010.

=== Pet Food Manufacturing Facility Certification Program & Pet Food Ingredient Facility Certification Program ===
The AFIA launched a Pet Food Manufacturing Facility Certification Program and Pet Food Ingredient Facility Certification Program, both of which are based on SF/SF guidelines. However, these certification programs are adjusted to specifically meet pet food safety requirements. The Pet Food Certification Programs are meant to help re-establish consumer confidence in quality feed provided by pet food companies.
