= FEFANA =

EU animal feed industry trade association

FEFANA asbl (Fédération Européenne des Fabricants d’Adjuvants pour la Nutrition Animal, EU Association of Specialty Feed Ingredients and their Mixtures) is a European Union trade association of the animal feed additives industry. Its membership comprises manufacturers and traders of feed additives, functional feed ingredients, premixes and other mixtures of specialty ingredients that enter the food chain via feed. FEFANA facilitates the dialogue between EU institutions and feed business operators while promoting feed and food safety and a fair and competitive market.

== History ==
The first statutes of FEFANA were signed on 22 January 1963 by the national associations in Belgium, France, Germany, Italy and the Netherlands. The acronym FEFANA originally stood for Fédération Européenne des Fabricants d’Adjuvants pour la Nutrition Animale. FEFANA has a new non-profit juridical status according to the Belgian law since 13 October 2004.

== See also ==
- Compound feed
