= Chelates in animal nutrition =

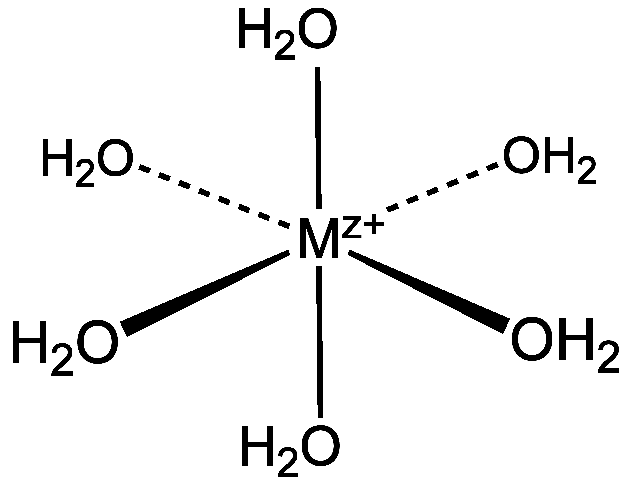
Structure of typical metal ion in the absence of chelate.

Chelates in animal feed is jargon for metalloorganic compounds added to animal feed. The compounds provide sources of various metals that improve the health or marketability of the animal. Typical metal salts are derived from cobalt, copper, iron, manganese, and zinc. The objective of supplementation with trace minerals is to avoid a variety of deficiency diseases. Trace minerals carry out key functions in relation to many metabolic processes, most notably as cofactors for enzymes and hormones, and are essential for optimum health, growth and productivity. For example, supplementary minerals help ensure good growth, bone development, feathering in birds, hoof, skin and hair quality in mammals, enzyme structure and functions, and appetite. Deficiency of trace minerals affects many metabolic processes and so may be manifested by different symptoms, such as poor growth and appetite, reproductive failures, impaired immune responses, and general ill-thrift. From the 1950s to the 1990s most trace mineral supplementation of animal diets was in the form of inorganic minerals, and these largely eradicated associated deficiency diseases in farm animals. The role in fertility and reproductive diseases of dairy cattle highlights that organic forms of Zn are retained better than inorganic sources and so may provide greater benefit in disease prevention, notably mastitis and lameness.

Animals are thought to better absorb, digest, and use mineral chelates than inorganic minerals or simple salts. In theory lower concentrations of these minerals can be used in animal feeds. In addition, animals fed chelated sources of essential trace minerals excrete lower amounts in their faeces, and so there is less environmental contamination.

== History and terminology ==
Structure of a typical metal–edta chelate compound, illustrating how the organic chelating agent (edta) wraps around the metal.

Since the 1950s, animal feeds have been supplemented with a variety of trace minerals such as copper (Cu), iron (Fe), iodine (I), manganese (Mn), molybdenum (Mo), selenium (Se), and zinc (Zn). Initially, such supplementation was in the form of inorganic salts of these trace elements, e.g. copper(II) sulfate. Chelated minerals were first developed in the early 1970s, but saw more growth in the 1980s and 1990s. Trace mineral chelates have been shown in some cases to be more efficient than inorganic minerals in meeting the nutritional needs of farm animals. In some cases, chelates offer no advantage however.

=== Terminology ===
- "Essential metals" usually refers to ions that are components of enzymes that are required for growth. Only small amounts are typically required, but their deficiency leads to disease and death. Some trace elements are molybdenum (MoO_{4}^{2-}), [ cobalt (Co^{2+}), and copper (Cu^{2+}). Illustrative enzymes containing these elements are, respectively, xanthine oxidase, vitamin B12, and azurin. Some metals are more abundant in nature, such as zinc (as Zn^{2+}), iron (as Fe^{2+} and Fe^{3+}), and magnesium (as Mg^{2+}). Some trace elements are not metals, such as selenium.
- "Mineral" is jargon for compounds that contain metal ions, more specifically "inorganic nutrients, usually required in small amts. from less than 1 to 2500 mg per day".
- "Chelate" is jargon for metal complexes of chelating agents. *Chelates are organic molecules, normally consisting of 2 organic parts with an essential trace mineral occupying a central position and held in place by covalent bonding.
- "Chelating agents" are ligands that bind metal ions through more than one bond. Most chelating agents are organic compounds, e.g., EDTA^{4-}. Metal chelate formulations often contain 10-20% of the metal. A variety of chelating agents are used, such as peptides and amino acids derived from hydrolysed soy proteins, which form amino acid complexes.

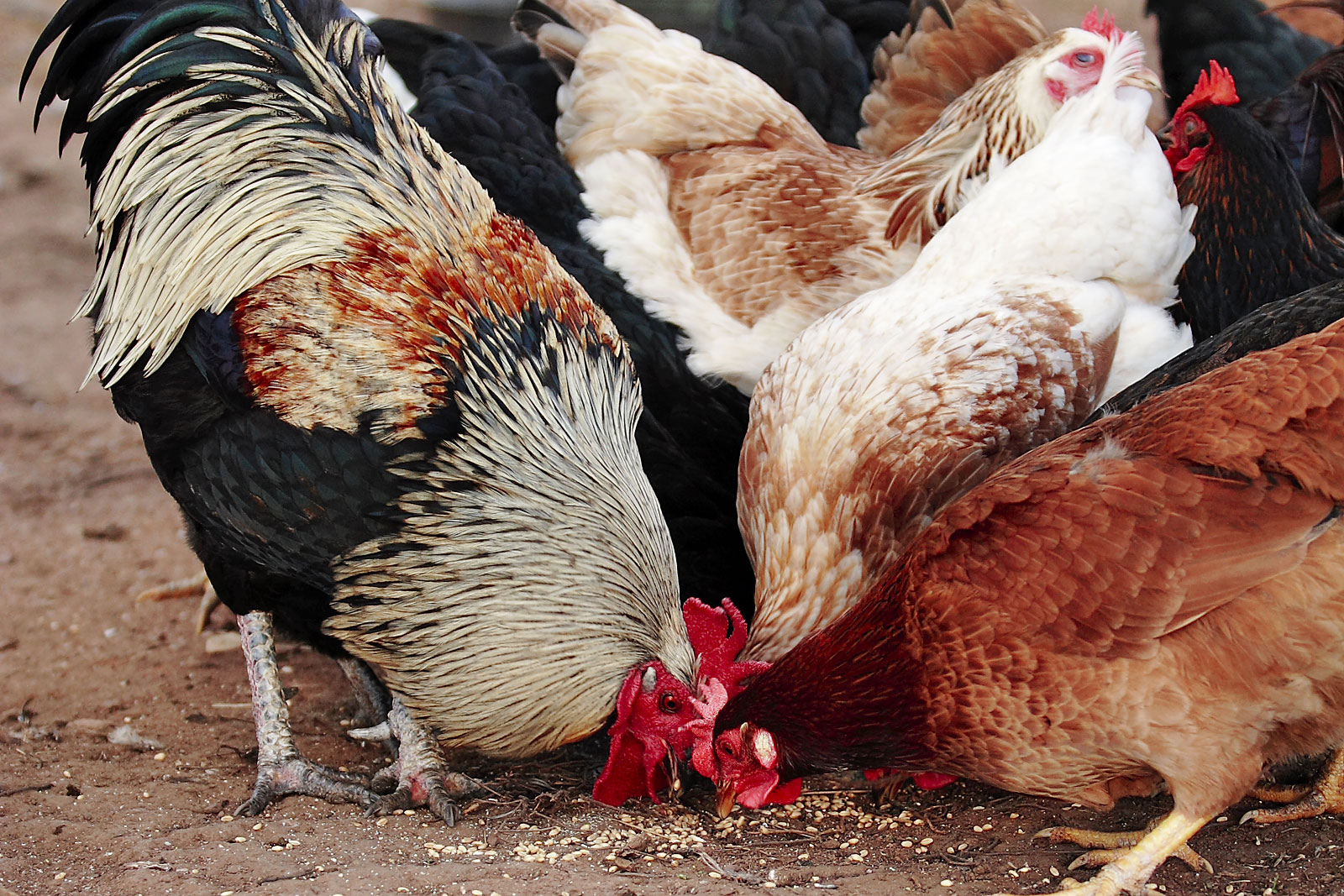
Chelates are incorporated into the feed.

== Research ==
- The utilisation of chelated copper, including copper-lysine formulations, is higher than that of inorganic copper sulfate when fed to rats in the presence and absence of elemental Zn or Fe. The data suggest that, unlike inorganic Cu, organic Cu chelates exhibit absorption and excretion mechanisms that do not interfere with Fe. Copper chelate also achieved higher liver Zn, suggesting less interference at gut absorption sites in comparison with the other forms of Cu.
- The effects of organic zinc sources on performance, zinc status, carcass, meat, and claw quality in fattening bulls has been studied. Livestock Prod. compared a Zn chelate, a Zn polysaccharide complex and ZnO (inorganic zinc oxide) in bull beef cattle, and concluded that the organic forms resulted in some improvement in hoof claw quality.
- The bioavailability of Cu and Zn chelates in sheep have been compared to the inorganic sulfate forms, at "low" and "high" supplementation rates. Copper and Zn chelates at the lower rates caused significantly greater increases in blood plasma concentrations than the corresponding treatments with Zn sulfate (p<0.05) and Cu sulfate (p<0.01). In addition, zinc chelate supplementation resulted in significantly greater hoof and horn Zn content than did Zn sulfate (p<0.05). At the "low" supplementation rate, zinc chelate achieved better hoof quality than Zn sulfate (p<0.05). The data suggest that Cu and Zn chelates are more readily absorbed and more easily deposited in key tissues such as hooves, in comparison with inorganic Zn forms.
- In weaned piglets, various supplementation rates of organic Zn in the form of a chelate or as a polysaccharide complex have been evaluated and compared with ZnO, zinc oxide, at 2,000 ppm. Feeding lower concentrations of organic Zn greatly decreased the amount of Zn excreted in comparison with inorganic Zn, without loss of growth performance.
- Copper chelate in weaned pigs have been compared with inorganic Cu and sulfate. Piglet performance was consistently better with organic Cu at 50 to 100 ppm, in comparison with inorganic Cu at 250 ppm. In addition, organic Cu increased Cu absorption and retention, and decreased Cu excretion 77% and 61% respectively, compared with 250 ppm inorganic Cu.
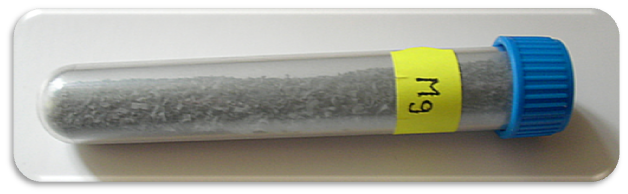
  Magnesium sample
- The effects of an Mg chelate in broiler chickens have been compared with magnesium oxide and an unsupplemented control group. Diets for fattening chicken are not normally supplemented with Mg, but this study indicated positive effects on performance and meat quality. During the first 3 weeks of life, the Mg chelate improved feed efficiency significantly in comparison with both the inorganic MgO and the negative control group (p<0.05). Thigh meat pH and oxidative deterioration during storage were also studied. The Mg chelate increased thigh meat pH in comparison with the negative control (p<0.05). Mg supplementation significantly reduced chemical indicators (TBARS) of oxidative deterioration in liver and thigh muscle (p<0.01), with Mg chelate significantly more efficient than MgO (p<0.01). The data suggest that organic Mg in the form of a chelate is capable of reducing oxidation, and so improve chicken meat quality.
- A Zn chelate supplement was compared with zinc sulfate in broiler chickens. Weight gain and feed intake increased quadratically (p<0.05) with increasing Zn concentrations from the chelate and linearly with Zn sulfate. The relative bioavailability of the Zn chelate was 183% and 157% of Zn sulfate for weight gain and tibia Zn, respectively. The authors concluded that the supplemental concentration of Zn required in corn-soy diets for broilers from 1–21 days of age would be 9.8 mg/kg diet as Zn chelate and 20.1 mg/kg diet as Zn sulfate, respectively.
- The effects of replacing inorganic minerals with organic minerals in broiler chickens have been studied. One group of chickens received inorganic sulfates of Cu (12 ppm), Fe (45 ppm), Mn (70 ppm) and Zn (37 ppm) and their performance was compared to a similar group supplemented with chelates of Cu (2.5 ppm), Fe, Mn, and Zn (all at 10 ppm). There were no differences in performance between the birds fed the high inorganic minerals and the birds fed the low organic chelates. Faecal concentrations of Cu, Fe, Mn and Zn were 55%, 73%, 46% and 63%, respectively, of control birds fed inorganic minerals.
- A study compared inorganic and organic mineral supplementation in broiler chickens. Control birds were fed Cu, Fe, Mn, Se, and Zn in inorganic forms (15 ppm Cu from sulfate; 60 ppm Fe from sulfate etc.), and compared with three treatment groups supplemented with organic forms. Apart from improved feathering, most likely associated with the presence of organic Se, there were no significant performance differences between birds fed inorganic and organic minerals. The authors concluded that the use of organic trace minerals permits a reduction of at least 33% in supplement rates in comparison with inorganic minerals, without compromising performance.

== Regulation ==
The European Union is concerned about possible detrimental effects of excess supplementation with trace minerals on the environment or human and animal health, and in 2003 legislated a reduction in permitted feed concentrations of several trace metals (Co, Cu, Fe, Mn and Zn).
