= Medicated feed =

American legal terminology

Medicated feed is an American legal terminology. As of 2019, it was defined in 21 CFR § 558.3.

== History and synopsis ==
The Animal Drug Availability Act 1996 introduced the term of new animal drug, which should be applied in combination with traditional animal feeds such as hay and oats and barley. The FDA found it expedient to subdivide this term into two categories, according to the withdrawal period necessary to be observed prior to slaughter for animals about to enter the human food chain; and

Prior to the enactment, only two categories of animal feed drugs existed: over-the-counter or prescription. The ADAA introduced Veterinary Feed Directive drugs. Medicated feeds are differentiated in § 558.3 from VFD rations, in that a licensed veterinarian is not required to supervise the feed product. Medicated feeds are available over-the-counter from agricultural suppliers.

New animal drugs are the functional ingredients for medicated feeds.

A “Type C medicated feed” is intended as the complete feed for the animal or may be fed “top dressed” (added on top of usual ration) on or offered “free-choice” (e.g., supplement) in conjunction with other animal feed. It contains a substantial quantity of nutrients including vitamins, minerals, and/or other nutritional ingredients... The manufacture of a Type C medicated feed... requires a medicated feed mill license.

— FDA, 21 CFR § 558.3

The distinction between medicated feeds and VFD feeds is somewhat flexible. On 1 January 2017, veterinary oversight was added to a significant number of antibiotic drugs in animal feed, so as to ensure that they are "medically necessary". The VFD label was applied to, among others, chlortetracycline, hygromycin, penicillin, lincomycin, oxytetracycline, tylosin, virginiamycin and neomycin.
