= Fefana, Hanumangarh =

Phephana
- Village
- Phephana
- Country: India
- State: Rajasthan
- District: Hanumangarh

Area
  - Total: 4 km^{2} (1.5 sq mi)

Population
  - Total: 13,117
  - Rank: 1 ( in nohar)
  - Density: 3,300/km^{2} (8,500/sq mi)

Languages
  - Official: Hindi, Bagdi, Punjabi, Haryanvi
- Time zone: UTC+5:30 (IST)
- Postal code: 335523
- ISO 3166 code: RJ-IN
- Nearest city: Nohar Ellenabad Sirsa Haryana
- Lok Sabha constituency: Churu
- Vidhan Sabha constituency: Nohar

Phephana (alternately Fefana) is a village in Hanumangarh district of Rajasthan state in India. This is the largest village of rajasthan .

Phephana is now has उप तहसील कार्यालय, फेफाना
