= Total mixed ration =

Method of feeding dairy cattle

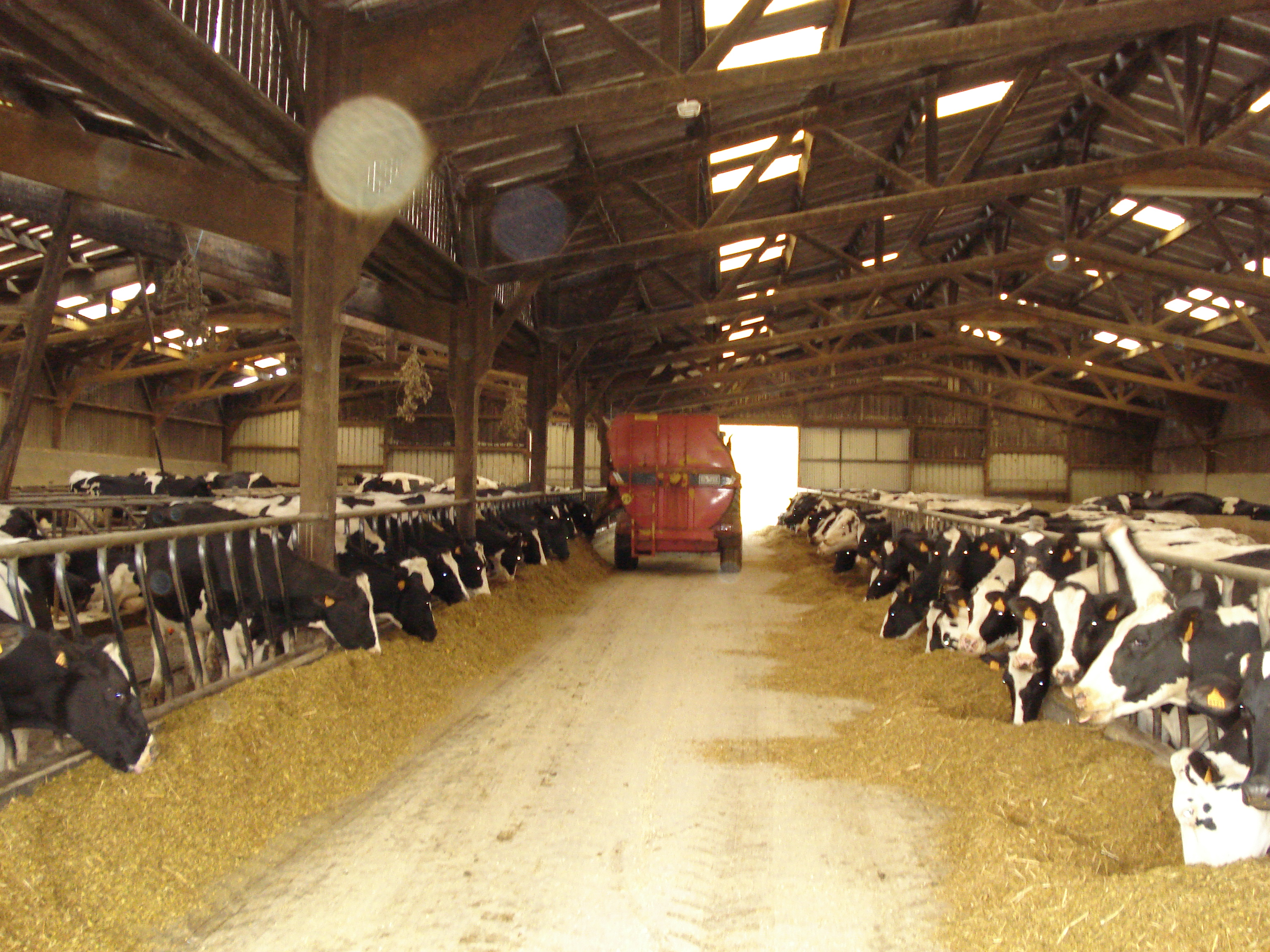
Distributing TMR to a group of dairy cows

Total mixed ration (TMR) is a method of feeding beef and dairy cattle. A TMR diet achieves a wide distribution of nutrients in uniform feed rather than switching between several types. A cow's ration should include good quality forages, a balance of grains and proteins, vitamins and minerals.

== Management ==
The number of groups of animals to be part of a TMR diet depend on existing herd size, the layout of barn, and loafing areas. Typically a dairy barn will have high, medium and low production lactating cows, far off and close up dry cows, and pre-breeding and post-breeding heifers. These groups are essential as some (such as first lactation cows) don't do well in overcrowded feed areas. When working with two or three groups it is easier as the caretaker can feed the low costing forage to the low group and the high quality forage to the higher group to increase the overall health and performance of the cows. For dry cows this system can minimize metabolic and nutritional disorders in calving and the post-partpartum period. A pre-breeding and post-breeding system is essential for heifers to ensure proper growth and development. It is important for pre-breeding heifers to have an energy- and protein-dense diet, while post-breeding heifers lack the ability to consume high forage diets.

== Summary ==
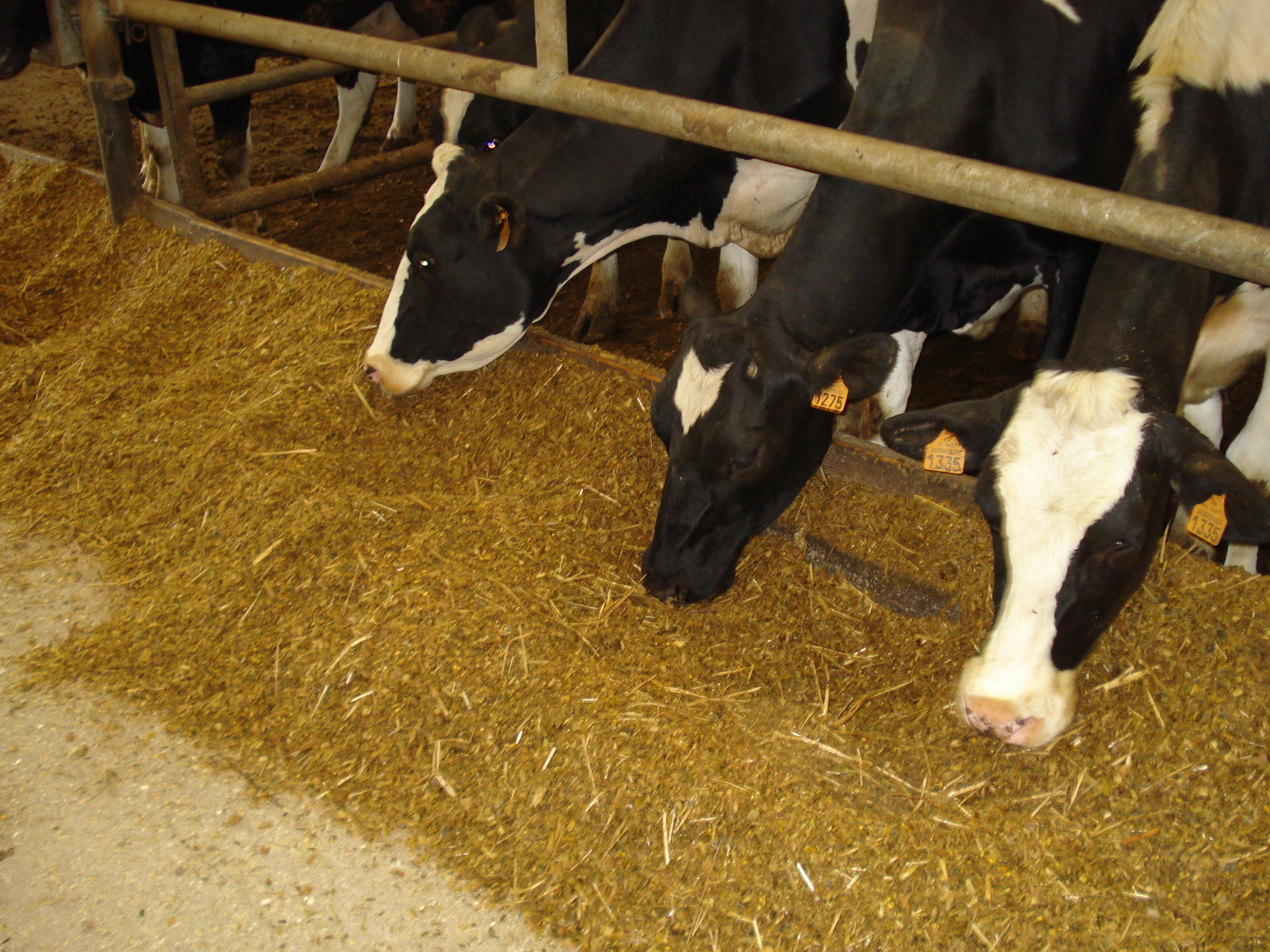
Dairy cows eating a TMR

- Complete rations feature the blended approach; all forages, concentrates, protein supplements, minerals and vitamins are mixed and offered as a single feed.
- Complete-ration systems can save labour and reduce overall feeding costs.
- It is extremely important to keep the mixture exactly the same day after day and to make big changes gradually.
- Early detection of problems with the ration system is possible by observing the bulk tank milk level after each milking.
- Forage analysis is necessary and should include dry matter, crude protein, acid detergent fiber, neutral detergent fiber, calcium and phosphorus.
- TMR can be used effectively by many dairy farmers, but it is not a substitute for good management. In fact, the intensity of management may be increased. Most of all, management skills and competency of the dairy farmer are critical to make this system work effectively.
