= Animal Drug Availability Act 1996 =

US law

- Long title: An Act to amend the Federal Food, Drug, and Cosmetic Act to provide for improvements in the process of approving and using animal drugs, and for other purposes.
- Acronyms (colloquial): ADAA
- Nicknames: Animal Drug Availability Act of 1995
- Enacted by: the 104th United States Congress
- Effective: October 9, 1996

Citations
- Public law: 104-250
- Statutes at Large: 110 Stat. 3151

Codification
- Acts amended: Federal Food, Drug, and Cosmetic Act
- Titles amended: 21 U.S.C.: Food and Drugs
- U.S.C. sections amended: 21 U.S.C. ch. 9 § 301 et seq.; 21 U.S.C. ch. 9 § 321 et seq.; 21 U.S.C. ch. 9 § 354; 21 U.S.C. ch. 9 § 360b et seq.

Legislative history
- Introduced in the House as H.R. 2508 by Wayne Allard (R–CO) on October 19, 1995; Committee consideration by House Commerce; Passed the House on September 24, 1996 (agreed voice vote); Passed the Senate on September 25, 1996 (passed unanimous consent); Signed into law by President William J. Clinton on October 9, 1996

The Animal Drug Availability Act 1996 (ADAA) is a United States federal law. President Clinton signed the ADAA into law in October 1996. While still obligated to public health concerns, the Act intends more rapid drug approval and medicated feed approval to assist the animal health industry.

== Overview ==
The Animal Drug Availability Act specifies the conditions in which the U.S. Secretary of Health can refuse the application of a new drug. The possibility of an unconsidered hazard is not a permitted ground for refusing an application. The implications of the act include:

- more relaxed controls on field studies unless requested and justified by the Center for Veterinary Medicine;
- a strict demand for proof of efficacy;
- a definition of adequate and well controlled procedures for field trials;
- supporting labeling focused on the range of recommended or acceptable dosages;
- the creation of Veterinary Feed Directive drugs as a new category of animal drugs.

== Details ==
=== Antibiotics in agriculture before ADAA statute ===
Antibiotic use was once common practice before the ADAA approved the use of antibacterials in animal feed. For 1985 the estimated annual antibiotic use in the U.S. are as follows. Cows were given 1 million pounds of antibiotics, 0.55 million pounds for swine, and 0.67 million pounds for poultry as therapeutic use, constituting legitimate bacterial infection treatment. Quantities for subtherapeutic use specified as; increase the daily body weight gain, improve the food-to-weight gain ratio, and increase the voluntary intake of food equals 3.1 million pounds in cows, feeding swine with 11 million pounds, and poultry with 2 million pounds. For each of these livestock species the subtherapeutic use is substantially higher: this contributes unnecessarily to possible microbial resistance. Those quantities preceded the ADAA, so approving veterinary feed including antibiotics for market contributed to progressing livestock medication. In 2003 the over 24 million pounds of antibiotics used for subtherapeutic use were distributed as follows: 10.3 million pounds for swine, 10.5 million pounds fed to poultry, and 3.7 million pounds given to cows.

=== Antibiotic resistant bacteria ===
The Union of Concerned Scientists estimate healthy hogs receive 5 million pounds of two tetracycline antibiotics, this is 60% greater than the total volume of antibiotics given to sick humans. Medical doctors advise appropriate use of antibiotics, specifically finishing the full antibiotic regimen with consequence of the strongest survivors recuperating and worsening the infection. Antibiotics create an environment appropriate for bacteria to evolve resistant strains, since when faced with death any survivors have become more appropriately adapted. This is the same principle as Darwinian evolution by natural selection. The development of resistant bacteria strains can be attributed to antibiotic use because resistance to the drugs was previously unobserved. The World Health Organization states: “Shortly after the licensing and use in livestock of fluoroquinolone, a powerful new class of antimicrobials, fluoroquinolone-resistant Salmonella and Campylobacter isolations from animals, and humans increased.” Most production for fast food incorporates antibiotics, but there has been a push by major companies including McDonald's, Subway and Carl's Jr. to discontinues fluoroquinolone use in associated feedlots.

=== Vancomycin-resistant enterococcus infection ===
VRE infection has been positively correlated to avoparcin use; around the time of Americas ADAA in 1996 Denmark banned this specific growth promoter and found the flocks at slaughter had a decreased occurrence of VRE to 12% in 1998 from 82% in 1995.
