= Veterinary Feed Directive =

In the US, a legal authorization for antibiotics to be given to animals in feed

A Veterinary Feed Directive (VFD) is, under the law of the United States, a written authorization allowing animal keepers to use animal feed containing specified antibiotics in accordance with Food and Drug Administration (FDA) approved directions for use.

== Synopsis ==
The requirement for a VFD was created by the Animal Drug Availability Act 1996 (P.L. 104-250). Regulations related to the VFD are published by the FDA's Center for Veterinary Medicine in 21 CFR 510, 514, and 558.

A VFD is required for any species of animal fed medicated feed containing a VFD drug; this law is not limited to livestock. VFD drugs must be used under the professional supervision of a licensed veterinarian.

The purpose of implementing the VFD is to aid in decreasing the levels of antibiotic resistance in human and animal populations. The FDA and CDC regulate the consumption and distribution of antibiotics due to the animal agriculture industry being identified as having an impact on the number of antibiotic resistance cases.

Producers must have a current veterinary-client-patient-relationship (VCPR) in order to obtain a written VFD. To have a VPCR, veterinarians must have sufficient knowledge of the health of the animals, and be able to diagnose the animal's condition. VCPR's cannot be confirmed electronically or over the phone; the veterinarian must physically examine a producer's animal within the past twelve months to keep the VCPR current. VCPR's must be followed under the state's guidelines that have been approved by the FDA.

The USDA states the information that must be included on a VFD form. A veterinary feed directive form must include the licensed veterinarian's as well as the client's contact information including the name, address, and telephone number. It must contain the physical location of the animals that are going to be fed the medicated feed. Dates that must be included consist of the VFD issue date, and the last date the animal can have the feed provided. The drug name needs to be present, as well as indication from the veterinarian that explains what the medicated feed is treating/curing. It also needs the prescription amount and strength of the medication that will be in the feed and the duration of feed use. The species and production class of animals, and the approximate number of animals that will be fed is also required. It must contain the number of refills authorized; the refills can only be authorized if the FDA drug approval or index listing allows. The withdrawal time for production animals, and special instructions need to be recorded. The form needs the veterinarian's electronic or written signature, and any additional information for the client.

Antibiotics regarded as not important for animal health are available over the counter (without a prescription), and can be used in animal feed without the authorization of a VFD.

To ensure the judicious use of antibiotics in food producing animals, the new regulations went into effect on January 1, 2017 and many drugs changed from over the counter to prescription status for medicated water and feed. Distributors and retailers that use these products are required to meet the new VFD regulations when dispensing these products.
