= Okinotori =

Reef in the Philippine Sea

Native name: 沖ノ鳥島, Okinotori-shima Okino-Tori Islands, Parece Vela
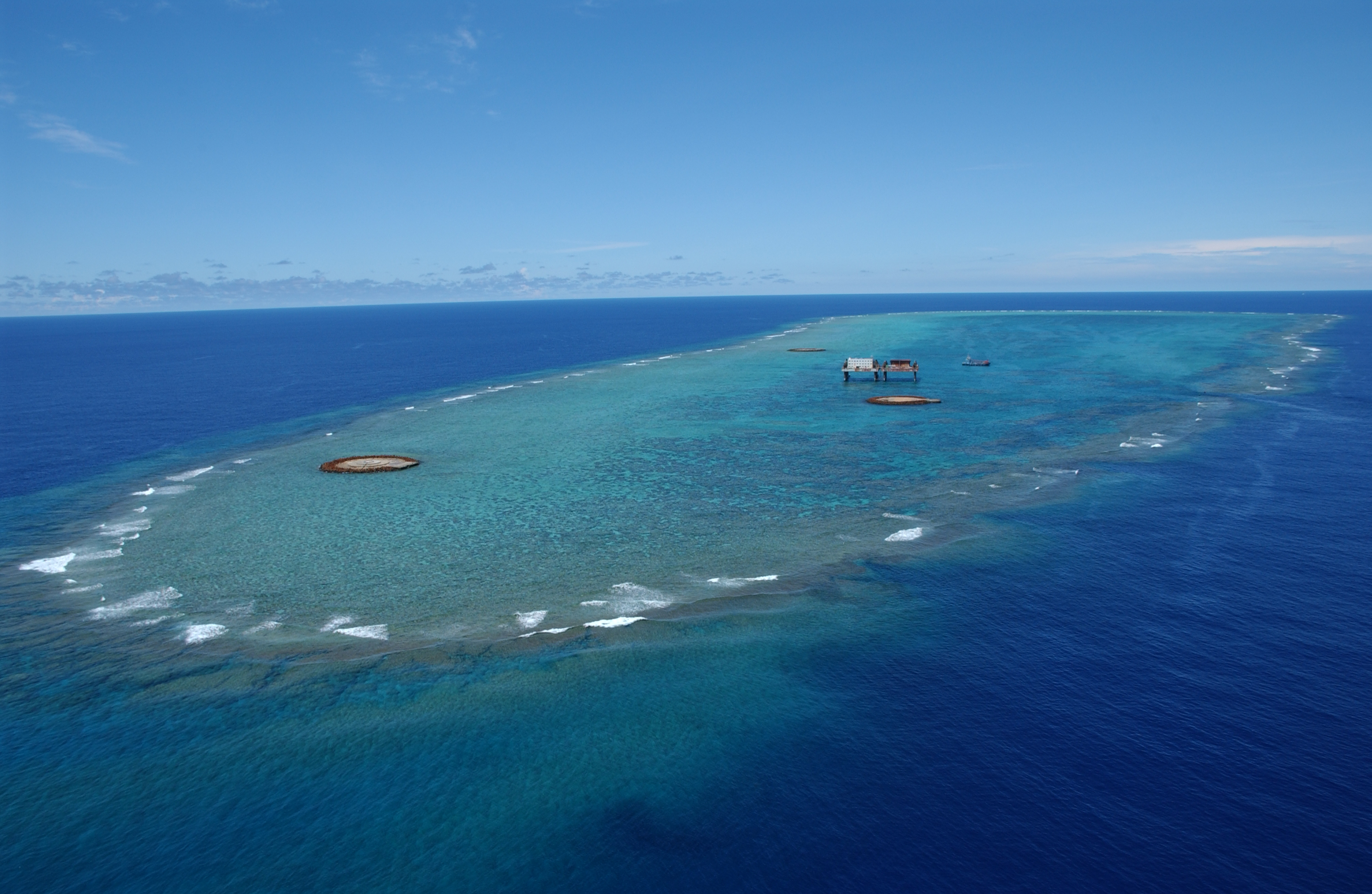
- Aerial photograph

Geography
- Location: Philippine Sea, Pacific Ocean
- Coordinates: 20°25′21″N 136°05′24″E
- Total islands: 1 atoll with 2 islets
- Area: Land area: 9.44 m^{2} (101.6 sq ft); Shoal area: 0.0085km^{2}
- Highest elevation: 1.5 m (4.9 ft)
- Highest point: unnamed point

Administration
- Japan
- Prefecture: Tokyo
- Subprefecture: Ogasawara Subprefecture
- Village: Ogasawara

Demographics
- Population: 0

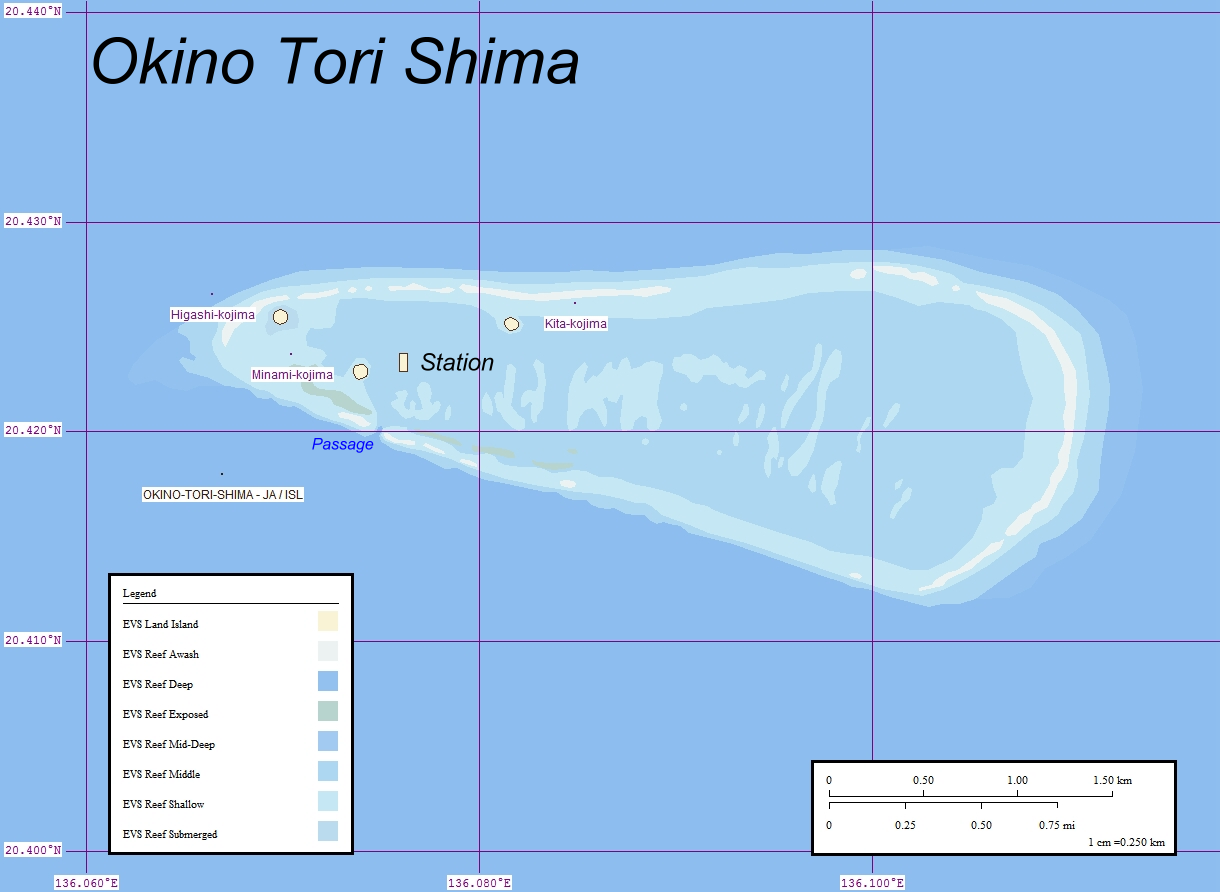
Map of Okinotori

Okinotori Island (沖ノ鳥島, Okinotori-shima), or Parece Vela, is a coral reef, geologically an atoll, with two rocks enlarged with tetrapod-cement structures. It is administered by Japan with a total shoal area of 8,482 m^{2} (2.10 acres) and land area 9.44 m^{2} (101.6 ft^{2}). Its dry land area is mostly made up by three concrete encasings and there is a 100 by 50 m (330 by 160 ft) stilt platform in the lagoon housing a research station. There is a third completely artificial tetrapod-cement islet.

Okinotori is located on the Palau–Kyushu Ridge in the Philippine Sea, 534 km (332 mi) southeast of Okidaitōjima and 567 km (352 mi) west-southwest of South Iwo Jima in the Bonin Islands or 1,740 km (1,080 mi) south of Tokyo, Japan. Okinotori is the southernmost part of Japan and the only Japanese territory south of the Tropic of Cancer.

Japan argues that Okinotori is significant enough for it to claim a 200 nmi (370 km) exclusive economic zone (EEZ) around it, but China, South Korea, and Taiwan dispute the Japanese EEZ, saying that the atoll does not meet the definition of an island under the United Nations Convention on the Law of the Sea.

== History ==
The atoll may have been sighted first by Spanish sailor Bernardo de la Torre in 1543, although the first undisputed sighting was by Miguel López de Legazpi in 1565. Its first recorded name was Parece Vela (Spanish for "looks like a sail", alluding to the original appearance of the reef). This name has been retained in English as well, especially to designate the geological formations of the islets.

In 1789, Captain William Douglas arrived with the British ship Iphigenia and, in 1790, the place was named Douglas Reef (also spelled Douglass Reef). This name continues to appear in modern sources. In 1796, what was likely the reef was then re-discovered by the brig Nautilus, under the command of Captain Charles Bishop, and the name Nautilus Rocks has appeared in some sources.

The existence of the atoll might not have been known by the Japanese until 1888. In 1922 and 1925, the Japanese navy ship Manshu investigated the area. In 1931, confirming that no other countries had claimed the reefs, Japan declared it Japanese territory, placing it under the jurisdiction of the Tokyo Metropolis, classifying it as part of the Ogasawara Village, and naming it Okinotori Island, meaning "remote bird islands". English names derived from the Japanese include Okinotori coral reefs and Okinotori Islands.

During 1939 and 1941, a foundation was completed for a lighthouse and a meteorological observation site, but construction was interrupted by the outbreak of World War II. After Japan's defeat, the United States assumed sovereignty over the Ogasawara islands, and returned authority over the islands to Japan in 1968.

Japan will concur in any proposal of the United States to the United Nations to place under its trusteeship system, with the United States as the sole administering authority, Nansei Shoto south of 29° north latitude (including the Ryukyu Islands and the Daito Islands), Nanpo Shoto south of Sofu Gan (including the Bonin Islands, Rosario Island and the Volcano Islands) and Parece Vela and Marcus Island.

— Treaty of San Francisco (1951)

1. With respect to Nanpo Shoto and other islands, as defined in paragraph 2 below, the United States of America relinquishes in favor of Japan all rights and interests under Article 3 of the Treaty of Peace with Japan signed at the city of San Francisco on September 8, 1951, effective as of the date of entry into force of this Agreement. Japan, as of such date, assumes full responsibility and authority for the exercise of all and any powers of administration, legislation and jurisdiction over the territory and inhabitants of the said islands.

2. For the purpose of this Agreement, the term "Nanpo Shoto and other islands" means Nanpo Shoto south of Sofu Gan (including the Bonin islands, Rasairo Island, and the Volcano Islands) and Parece Vela and Marcus Island, including their territorial waters.

— Agreement between Japan and the United States of America Concerning Nanpo Shoto and Other Islands (1968)

Between 1987 and 1993 the government of Tokyo and later the central government built steel breakwaters and concrete walls to stop the erosion of Okinotori, which today leaves only three of the five rocks that were present in 1939 above water; in 1988 the Japan Marine Science and Technology Center built a marine investigation facility which it has since maintained following typhoon damage. Funding for full repairs was finally allocated in early 2016. The facility also doubles as an EEZ observation post for the Maritime Bureau of the Ministry of Land, Infrastructure, Transport and Tourism, being equipped with radar and various other sensors to help monitor activity in the zone.

On March 16, 2007, a light beacon was installed by the Japan Coast Guard. The beacon is plotted on the hydrographic chart.

== Geology ==
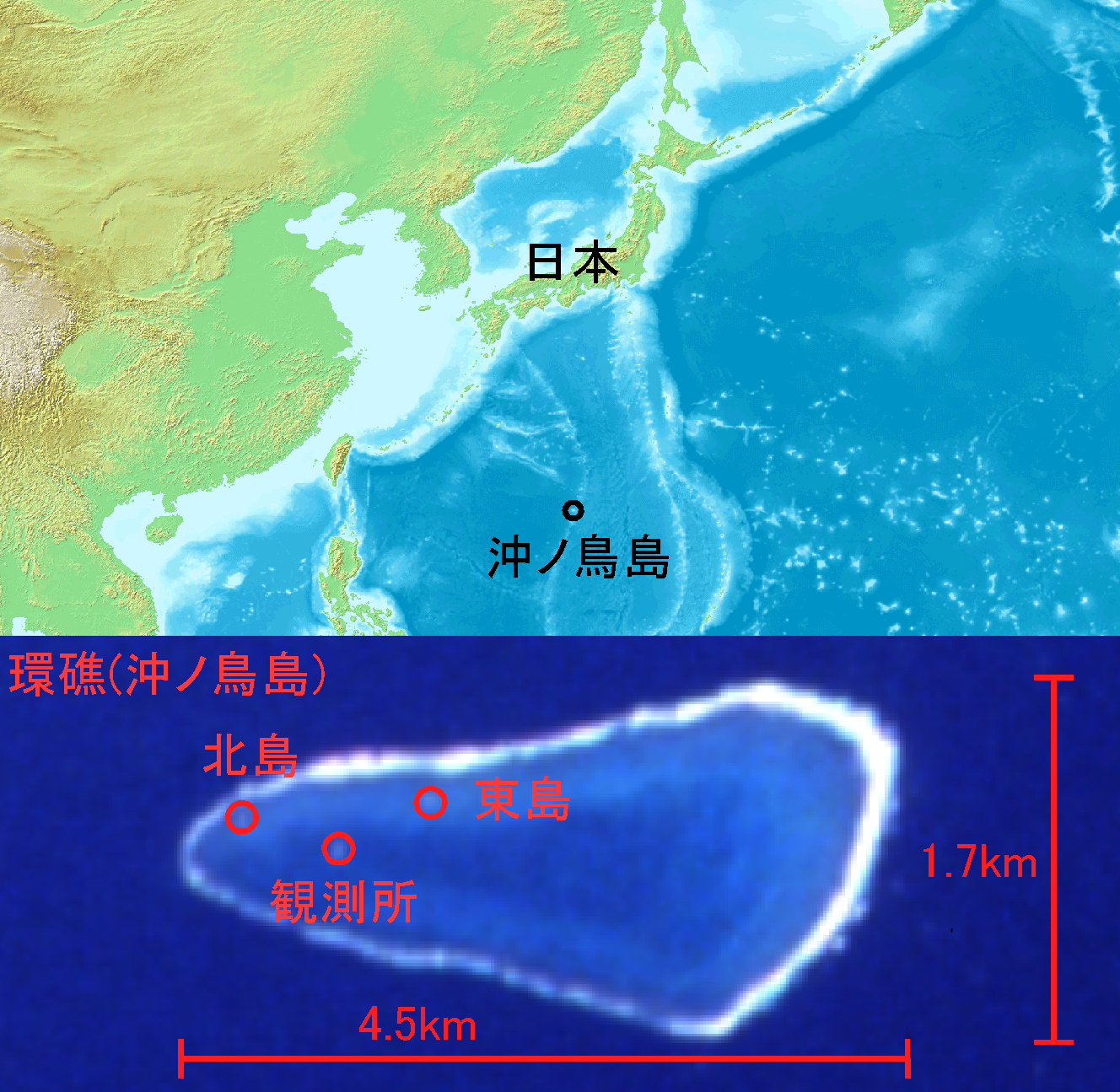
Location of Okinotori and details of the island

Geologically, the islets are a coral atoll, built on the Kyushu–Palau Ridge, the westernmost part of the Izu–Bonin–Mariana Arc system. The name Parece Vela Basin has been given to the extinct back-arc basin that lies immediately to the east (the northern half of this back-arc basin is known as the Shikoku Basin). This back-arc basin was formed by seafloor spreading between the late Oligocene and Miocene. The Parece Vela Basin contains the longest megamullion in the world. The original Spanish name of the islets is normally used for the geological formations, hence, Parece Vela megamullion, Parece Vela ridge, Parece Vela Rift or Parece Vela basin.

The waters around the reefs are potentially rich in oil and other mineral and fisheries resources and it lies in an area of potential military significance. At high tide, one area of the reef is 1.58 m^{2} (17.0 ft^{2}), roughly the size of a twin bed, and pokes just 7.4 cm (2.9 in) out of the ocean. The other is 7.86 m^{2} (84.6 ft^{2}), the size of a small bedroom, and rises 16 cm (6.3 in), about twice as high. The entire reef consists of approximately 7.8 km^{2} (3.0 sq mi), most of which is submerged even at low tide.

The area has three tiny individual islets:

- Higashi-Kojima (東小島, "Eastern Islet")
- Kita-Kojima (北小島, "Northern Islet"), nevertheless rather in the "West"
- Minami-Kojima (南小島, "Southern Islet")

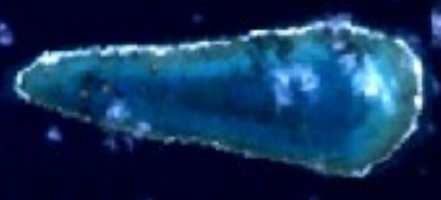
Satellite Image

Minami-Kojima is a completely artificial islet created in shallow water. But also the two original islets appear completely artificial today, with little if any trace of the two natural rocks that still appear on photographs of 1987. In 1925, there were still five above-water rocks, which have eroded since. A report from 1947 mentions five above-water rocks. Three smaller ones were on the west side, nearly impossible to see from seaward because of the breaking waves. The larger rocks on the southwest side and on the northeast side, possibly Kita-Kojima and Higashi-Kojima, were reported to be 0.6 and 0.4 m (24 and 16 in) high, respectively. The original rocks appeared barren, without any terrestrial vegetation. The current artificial dry land areas with their concrete surfaces appear unfit to support terrestrial vegetation either.

After concrete encasing, each of the islets appears as a circle with a diameter of 60 meters (196 ft) on detailed satellite images, which would correspond to a land area—albeit mostly artificial—of 2,827 m^{2} (0.699 acres) per islet, or 8,482 m^{2} (2.096 acres) in total. In addition, there is a platform on stilts in the shallow part of the lagoon 140 m (460 ft) east-northeast of the southern islet, built by the Japan Marine Science and Technology Center in 1988, which appears as a rectangle of 100 by 50 m (330 by 160 ft). The platform has a helicopter landing pad and a large three-story building with a marine investigation facility and a meteorological station.

The rocks are in the western part of a lagoon surrounded by a submerged coral reef, over which the waves break, and that extends 4.5 km (2.8 mi) east-west and 1.7 km (1.1 mi) north-south, with an area of roughly 5 km^{2} within the rim of the reef. The lagoon is 3 to 4.6 meters deep, but there are numerous coral heads of lesser depths throughout the area. The fringing reef of the atoll is pear-shaped in an east–west direction with its greatest width at the eastern end. There is a small boat channel into the lagoon in the southwest, about 15 m (49 ft) wide and 6 m (20 ft) deep, 250 m (820 ft) southeast of the artificial islet.

== Administration ==
Administratively, the island is considered part of Ogasawara village, Tokyo. In 1939, the construction of a naval base was started by Japan, but suspended in 1941, at the start of the Pacific War.

Typhoons are constant threats to Okinotori's existence. In the 1970s there were about five or six visible protrusions, but by 1989, only two were visible.

In order to prevent the island from submersion caused by erosion and maintain its claim to the EEZ, the Japanese government launched an embankment building project in 1987, and Higashikojima and Kitakojima were surrounded by concrete. Japan has encased the reefs with $280 million worth of concrete and covered the smaller one with a $50 million titanium net to shield it from debris thrown up by the ocean's waves. The Japanese government has spent over $600 million fortifying the reefs to prevent them from being completely washed away.

Furthermore, the Nippon Foundation has drawn plans to build a lighthouse and increase the size of the reef by breeding microorganisms known as foraminifera. Creating land using the microorganisms could take decades to a century before the island is large enough to be useful.

Currently, Japan carries out maritime research and observation of the area, as well as repair work on the embankment.

In 2005, the government installed a radar system (at the cost of ¥ 330 million), repaired a heliport, and placed an official address plaque saying, "1 Okinotori Island, Ogasawara Village, Tokyo" in Japanese. Fishing expeditions also support the claim of economic activity.

Former Tokyo Governor Shintaro Ishihara has talked of building a power station, despite protests by environmentalists. His government has helped fund expeditions to Okinotori by Japanese fishermen and scientists. Governor Ishihara himself toured the islands on May 20, 2005 to inspect the conservation and management efforts, went snorkeling to see firsthand the condition of the surrounding waters, and released Japanese horse mackerel fry to show support for the local fishing industry. The islands are an intermittent rallying point for Japanese nationalists, and, as such, a hot-button political issue in Japan.

== EEZ dispute ==
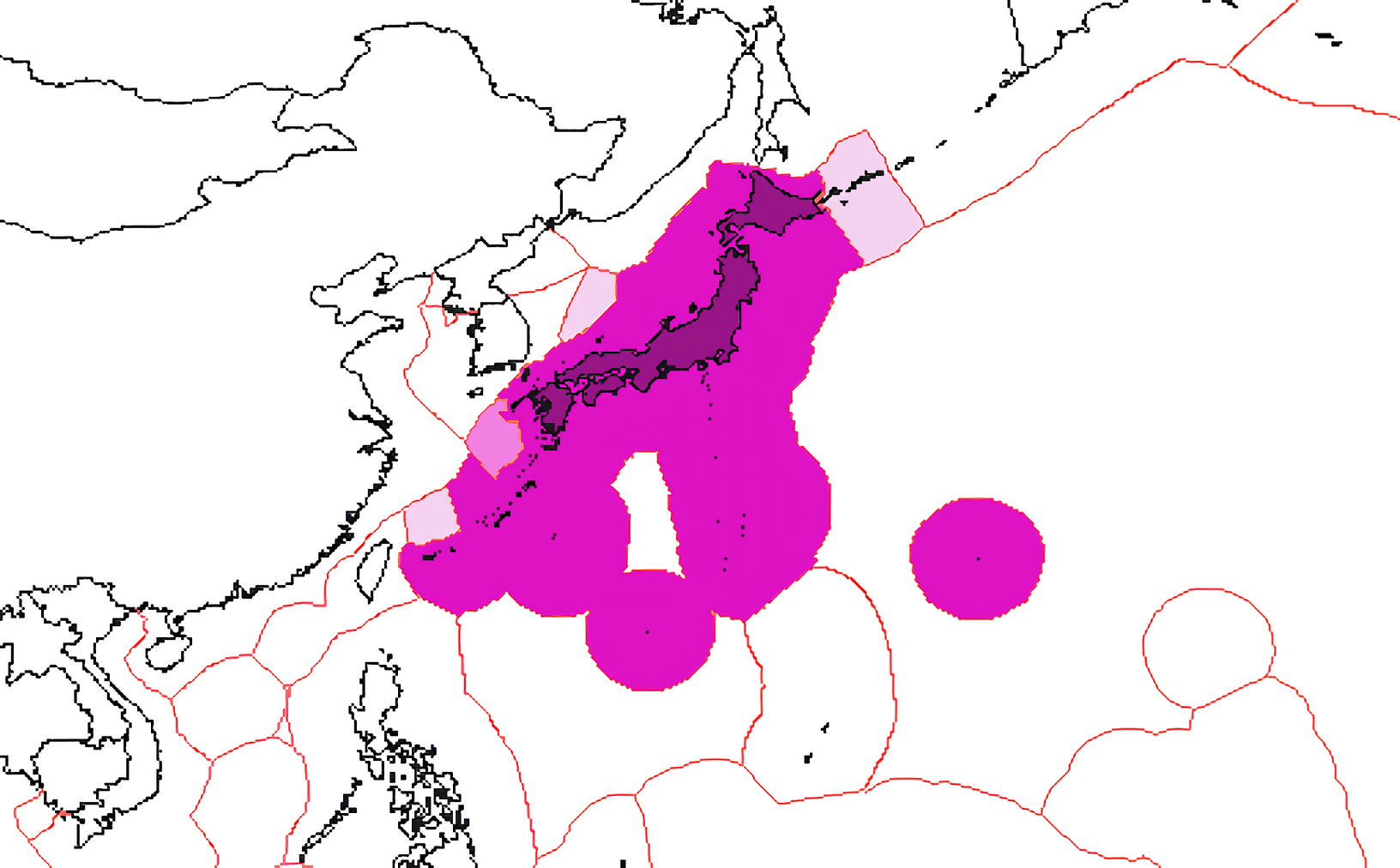
Exclusive economic zone of Japan. The lowermost purple near-circle is the area around Okinotori

In 1988, Jon van Dyke, a law professor at the University of Hawaii, challenged whether Okinotori met the requirements for establishing an exclusive economic zone (EEZ): "Article 121(3) of the 1982 Law of the Sea Convention, which Japan has signed, states that Rocks which cannot sustain human habitation or economic life of their own shall have no exclusive economic zone or continental shelf. Okinotori - which consists of two eroding protrusions no larger than king-size beds - certainly meets the description of an uninhabitable rock that cannot sustain economic life of its own. It is not, therefore, entitled to generate a 200-mile exclusive economic zone. The Law of the Sea Convention is also quite clear - in Article 60 (8) -that artificially built islands do not generate 200-mile resource zones. The more than $200 million the Japanese are spending to construct what is in essence an artificial island cannot, therefore, be the basis for a claim to the exclusive control over the resources in the waters around such a construction."

On 22 April 2004, Chinese diplomats stated during bilateral talks with Japan that they regarded Okinotori as an atoll, not an islet, and did not acknowledge Japan's claim to an EEZ stemming from Okinotori.

Under the United Nations Convention on the Law of the Sea, an island is "a naturally formed area of land, surrounded by water, which is above water at high tide". It states that "rocks which cannot sustain human habitation or economic life of their own shall have no exclusive economic zone." Japan signed the Convention in 1983; the Convention came into force in 1994–1996 for Japan.

Japan claims an EEZ over 400,000 square km (154,500 square miles) around Okinotori. China and South Korea dispute this claim in their addenda to the CLCS, saying the area only consists of rocks and not islands. Neither China nor South Korea have territorial claims regarding Okinotori, but foreign policy analysts speculated that they want to "investigate the surrounding seabed for submarine operations in case of military conflict involving the Republic of China (Taiwan)." Japan claims that rock is not defined in the convention. The construction of a port, lighthouse, and power station may be used as a counterargument for China's claim regarding "sustain[ing] human habitation or economic life"

The territory lies at a militarily strategic point, midway between Taiwan and Guam, the latter where U.S. forces are based. Vessels of the PRC are believed to have been mapping the ocean's bottom over which U.S. warships might pass on their way to Taiwan. The PRC conducted four maritime surveys near the Okinotori coral reefs in 2001, two in 2002, and one in 2003. However, the number of such incidents rose to four in 2004. These incidents have drawn protests from Japan.

Van Dyke has suggested that the situation is similar to the failed British attempt to claim an EEZ around Rockall, an uninhabited granite outcropping in the Atlantic Ocean. The UK eventually dropped its claim in the 1990s when other countries objected. Dr. Dyke has further asserted that it is impossible to make "a plausible claim that Okinotorishima should be able to generate a 200 [nautical]-mile zone". Tadao Kuribayashi, another law professor, disagrees, arguing in part that rocks and reefs differ in composition and structure, and that the intent of the provision was geared toward the former.

In 2016, Japan's arrest of a Taiwanese fishing ship's crew led Taiwan to protest against Japan's claim of island status for Okinotori and by extension the EEZ.

== See also ==
- Scarborough Shoal, another larger shoal with two skerries
- Hateruma
- Geography of Japan
- Japanese archipelago
- List of extreme points of Japan
- Territorial disputes of Japan
- Desert island
- List of islands
- Farallon de Pajaros
- Rockall
