= Cape Sōya =

Northernmost point of Hokkaidō, Japan

Cape Sōya 宗谷岬
- Cape
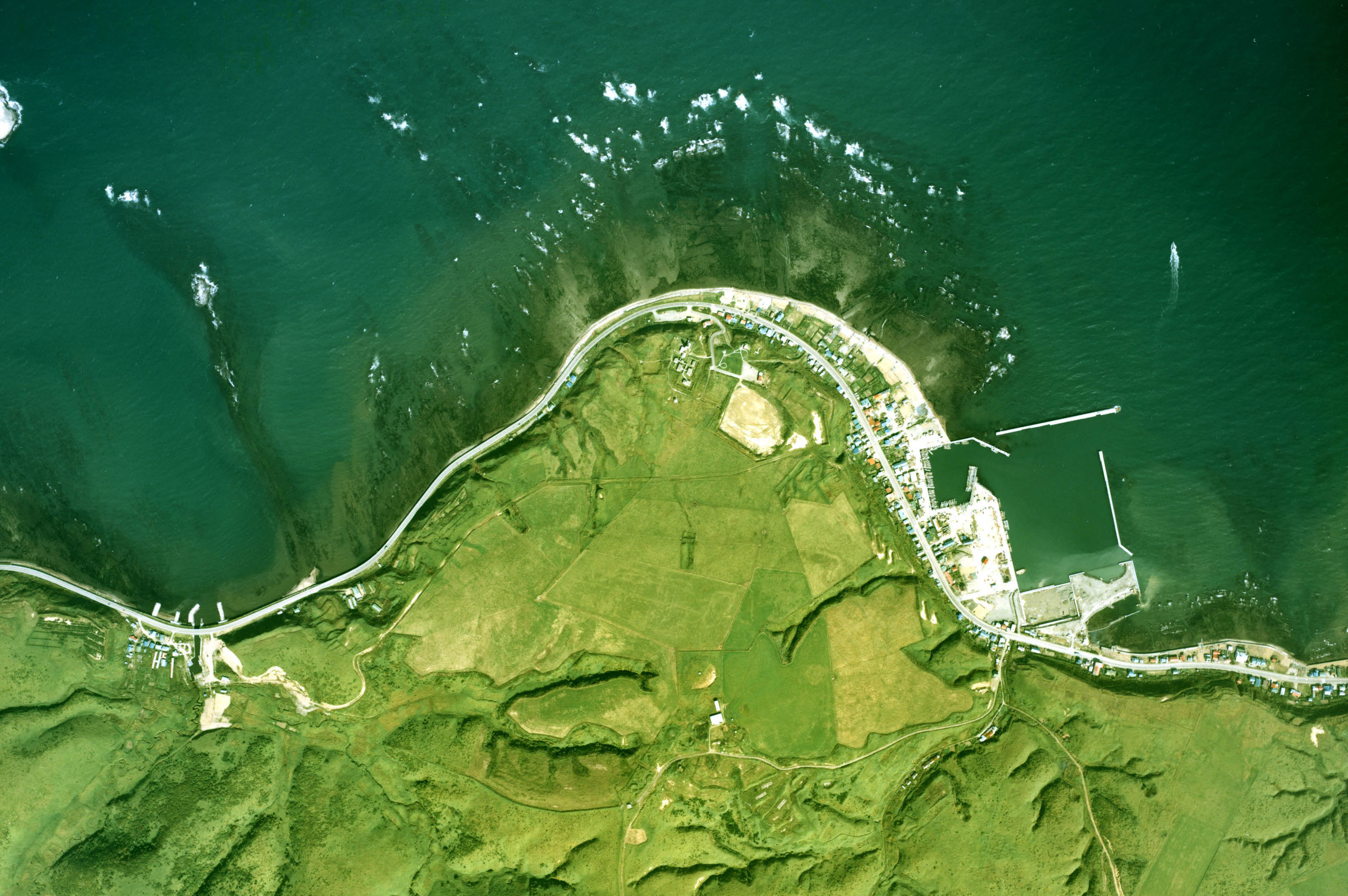
- Aerial image of the cape, 1977

- Location within Hokkaido Location within Japan
- Coordinates: 45°31′22″N 141°56′11″E
- Location: Wakkanai, Sōya Subprefecture, Japan
- Water bodies: Sea of Japan, Sea of Okhotsk

Cape Sōya (宗谷岬, Sōya-misaki) is the northernmost point of the island of Hokkaidō, Japan. It is situated in Wakkanai, Sōya Subprefecture. The Monument of the Northernmost Point of Japan (日本最北端の地の碑) is at the cape, although the true northernmost point under Japanese control is the small deserted island of Benten-jima, 1 kilometre (3,300 ft) northwest. Since the cape is just 43 kilometres (27 mi) away across La Perouse Strait from Cape Crillon, Sakhalin Island, it is possible to see the island of Sakhalin from Cape Sōya on a clear day.

There are more than ten monuments at Cape Sōya, including the Monument of the northernmost Point of Japan, the Tower of Prayer (a memorial to Korean Air Lines Flight 007, shot down in 1983), a statue of Mamiya Rinzō, the Monument of Peace (a memorial to the sunken submarine USS Wahoo, and others). Sōya Misaki settlement, east of the cape, has many facilities known to be "the northernmost in Japan", including the northernmost lighthouse (Cape Sōya Lighthouse), the northernmost filling station (Idemitsu Cape Sōya SS), and the northernmost elementary school (Ōmisaki Elementary School).

== Etymology ==
Cape Soya is called notetu in the Ainu language, where not means chin or cape, and etu means nose.

The name Soya is theorised to come from so ya in Ainu, meaning "Rocky shore".

== Monument of Peace ==
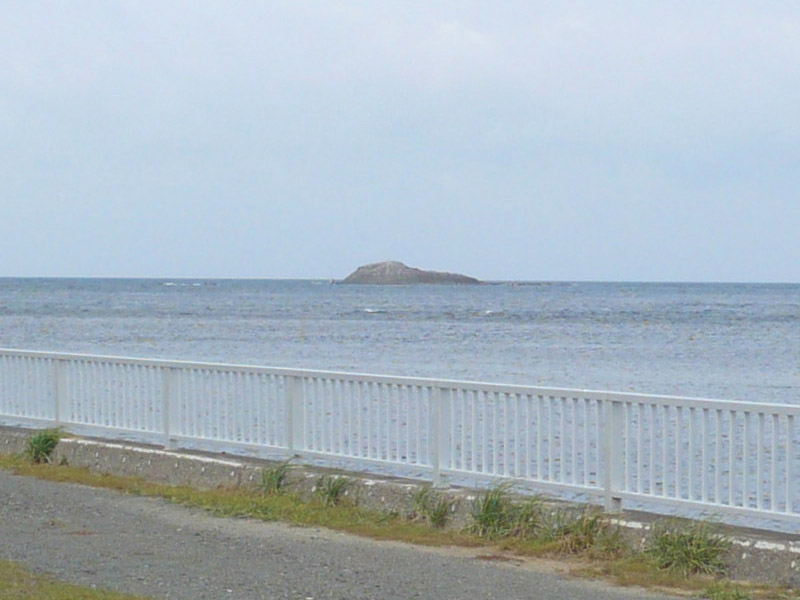
Benten-jima, viewed from Cape Sōya

On the site of Cape Sōya stands the Monument of Peace, a memorial to the USS Wahoo, sunk with 80 men aboard on October 11, 1943, as well as 5 Japanese merchant ships sunk with 690 people, attacked by Wahoo. The inscription on the memorial reads in part:

When the Wahoo was lost it was the highest-scoring submarine in the U.S. Navy. Eighty Americans sleep in the Soya Strait 12 miles northeast of here. Many Japanese sleep in the Sea of Japan from Wahoo attacks. This monument was erected by the members of the Japanese Attack Group and relatives of Americans lying in the Wahoo. Old enemies met as brothers to ensure that our countries will have lasting peace and war will never again destroy the friendship we enjoy today.

— George E. Logue

The exact position of Wahoo was confirmed by a dive team from the Sakhalin Energy Investment Company Ltd in July 2006.

== Tower of Prayer ==
Cape Sōya is the location of another memorial, the Tower of Prayer. The monument, which is 19.83 metres tall and constructed from granite, stands in remembrance of the 269 people that were killed during Korean Air Lines Flight 007 on 1 September 1983. In the incident, the aircraft operating the flight was shot down by a Soviet Air Forces Sukhoi Su-15 interceptor near Moneron Island, roughly 98 kilometres to the north of the cape.

== Climate ==
Climate data for Cape Sōya, elevation 26 m (85 ft), (1991–2020 normals, extremes 1978–present)
Month	Jan	Feb	Mar	Apr	May	Jun	Jul	Aug	Sep	Oct	Nov	Dec	Year
Record high °C (°F)	4.8 (40.6)	7.8 (46.0)	13.4 (56.1)	23.1 (73.6)	26.0 (78.8)	26.4 (79.5)	30.4 (86.7)	31.9 (89.4)	29.7 (85.5)	23.1 (73.6)	17.5 (63.5)	10.7 (51.3)	31.9 (89.4)
Mean daily maximum °C (°F)	−2.6 (27.3)	−2.4 (27.7)	1.0 (33.8)	7.1 (44.8)	11.7 (53.1)	15.2 (59.4)	19.0 (66.2)	21.6 (70.9)	19.6 (67.3)	13.8 (56.8)	6.1 (43.0)	0.0 (32.0)	9.2 (48.5)
Daily mean °C (°F)	−4.5 (23.9)	−4.6 (23.7)	−1.1 (30.0)	3.9 (39.0)	8.2 (46.8)	11.9 (53.4)	16.1 (61.0)	18.7 (65.7)	16.4 (61.5)	10.8 (51.4)	3.6 (38.5)	−2.1 (28.2)	6.4 (43.6)
Mean daily minimum °C (°F)	−6.6 (20.1)	−7.1 (19.2)	−3.7 (25.3)	0.8 (33.4)	5.1 (41.2)	9.2 (48.6)	13.7 (56.7)	16.2 (61.2)	13.4 (56.1)	7.6 (45.7)	1.0 (33.8)	−4.4 (24.1)	3.8 (38.8)
Record low °C (°F)	−16.3 (2.7)	−17.1 (1.2)	−14.9 (5.2)	−6.3 (20.7)	−1.5 (29.3)	1.7 (35.1)	5.7 (42.3)	10.2 (50.4)	5.0 (41.0)	−0.7 (30.7)	−10.0 (14.0)	−11.8 (10.8)	−17.1 (1.2)
Average precipitation mm (inches)	23.5 (0.93)	18.4 (0.72)	21.5 (0.85)	31.0 (1.22)	58.0 (2.28)	58.8 (2.31)	106.3 (4.19)	126.5 (4.98)	123.8 (4.87)	114.6 (4.51)	94.4 (3.72)	54.0 (2.13)	830.8 (32.71)
Average precipitation days (≥ 1.0 mm)	8.9	7.3	7.3	7.1	8.6	8.5	9.1	9.5	11.2	13.6	15.1	13.8	120
Mean monthly sunshine hours	49.9	91.5	156.0	187.1	177.9	142.0	123.1	153.1	179.2	141.7	61.0	29.0	1,490.5
Source 1: JMA
Source 2: JMA

== Gallery ==
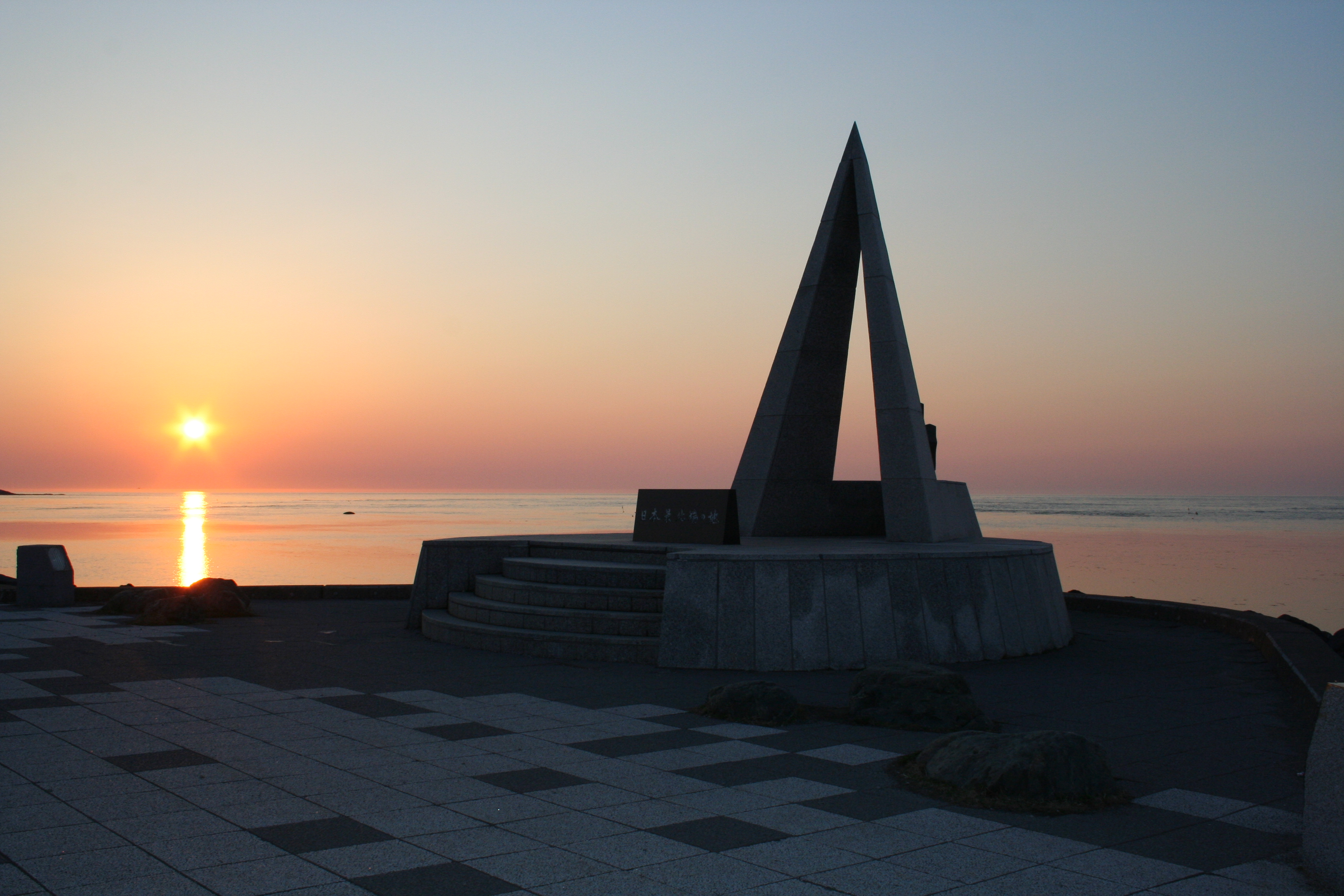
Sunset

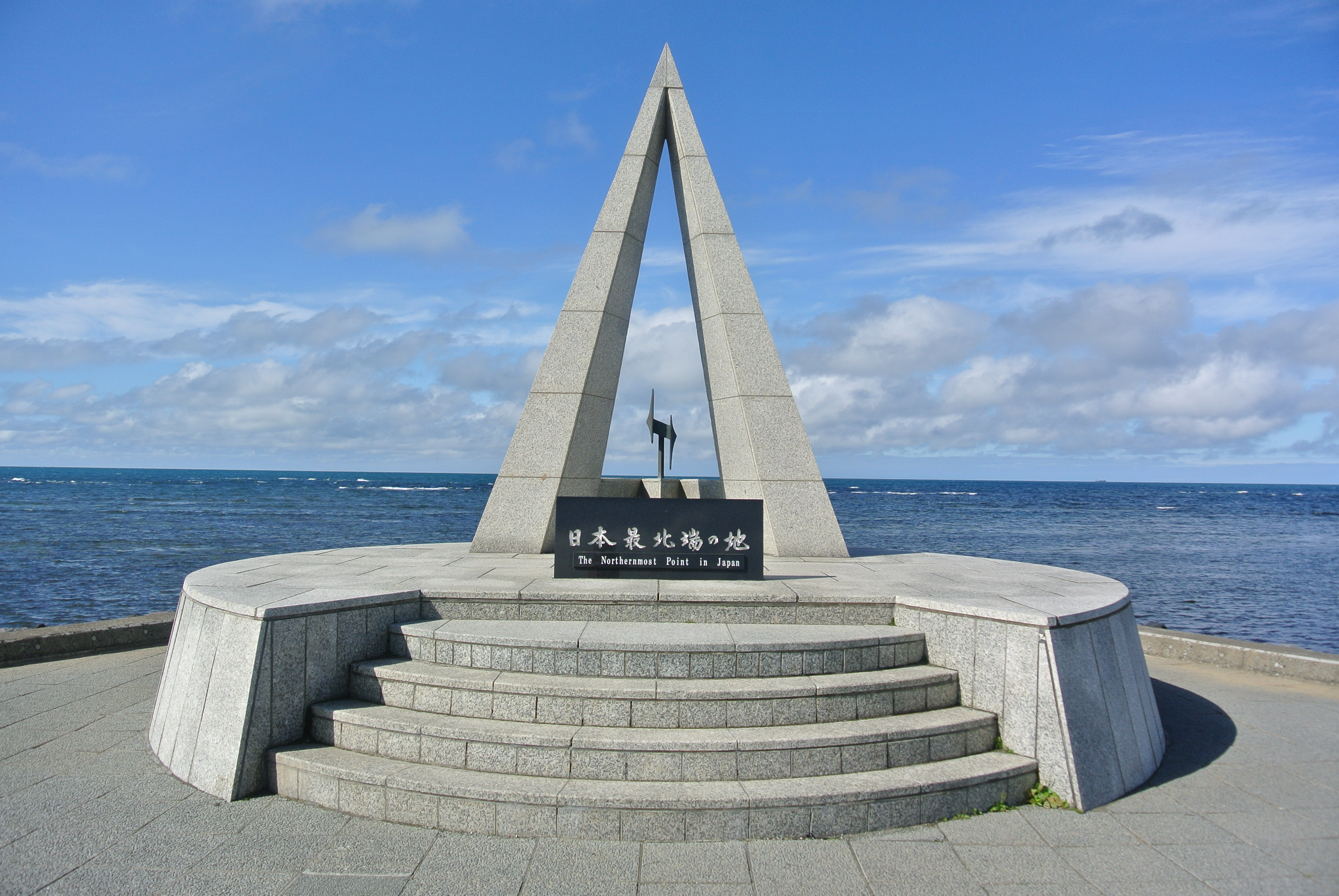
Monument of the northernmost Point of Japan

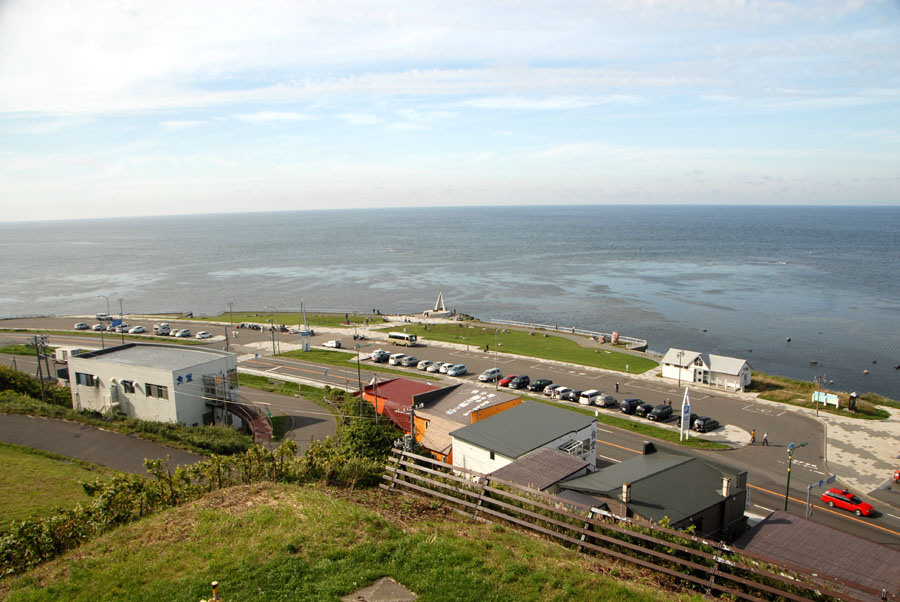
A view from a hill nearby

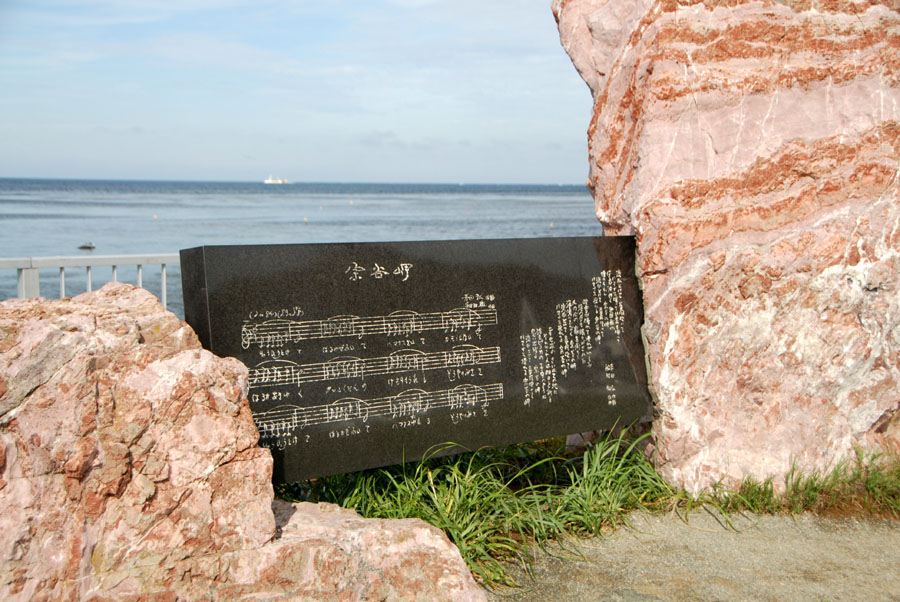
The "Music Monument" which automatically plays the song Sōya-misaki each time a visitor stands in front

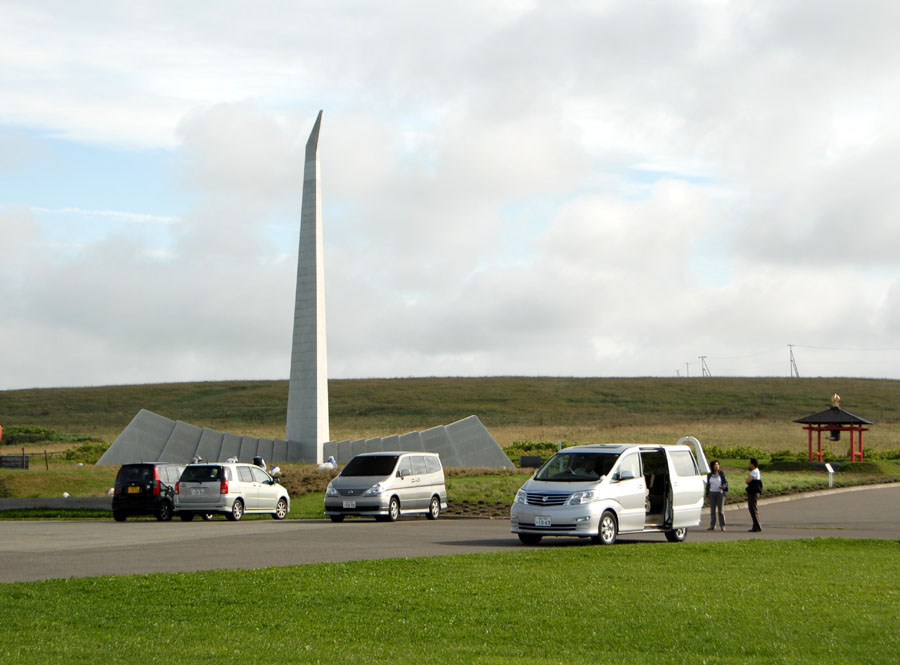
The Tower of Prayer, a memorial of Korean Air Lines Flight 007

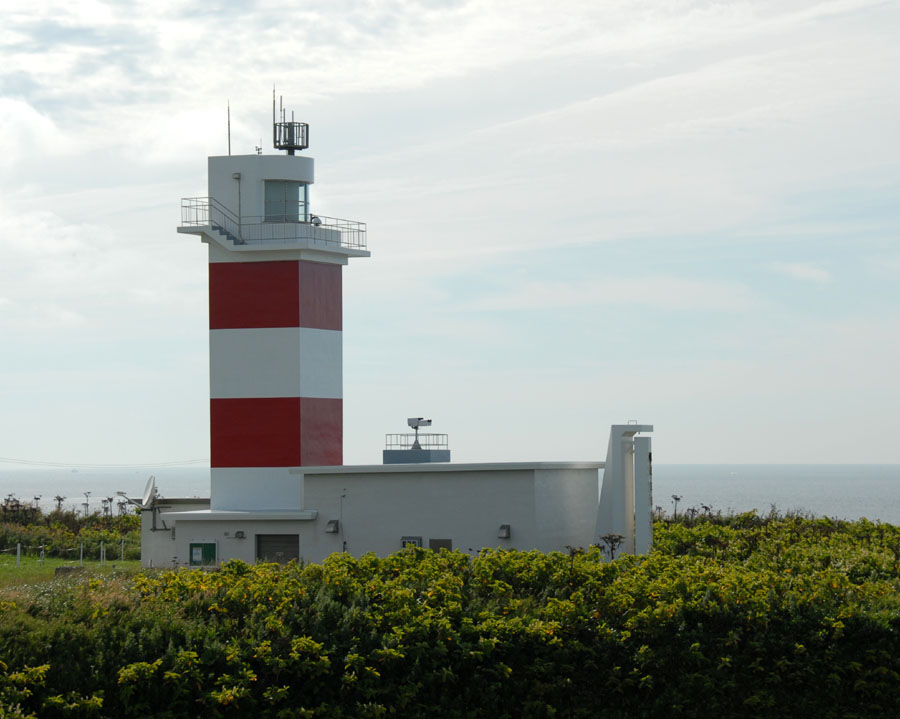
Cape Sōya Lighthouse

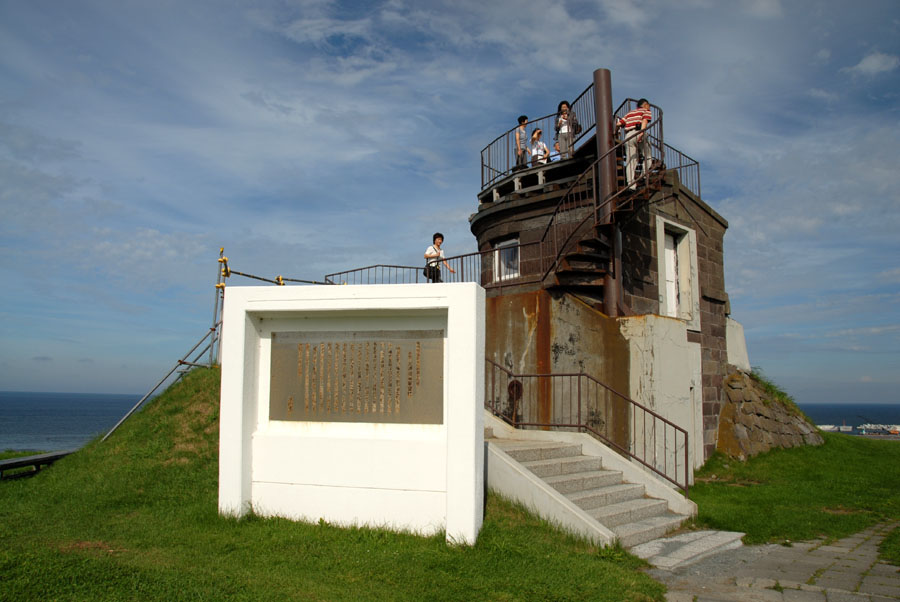
The observatory, used by the Imperial Japanese Navy to monitor the strait during the Russo-Japanese War

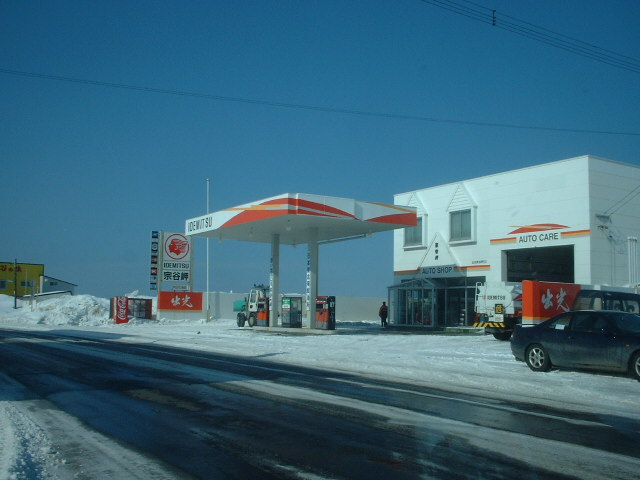
Idemitsu Cape Sōya SS, the northernmost filling station

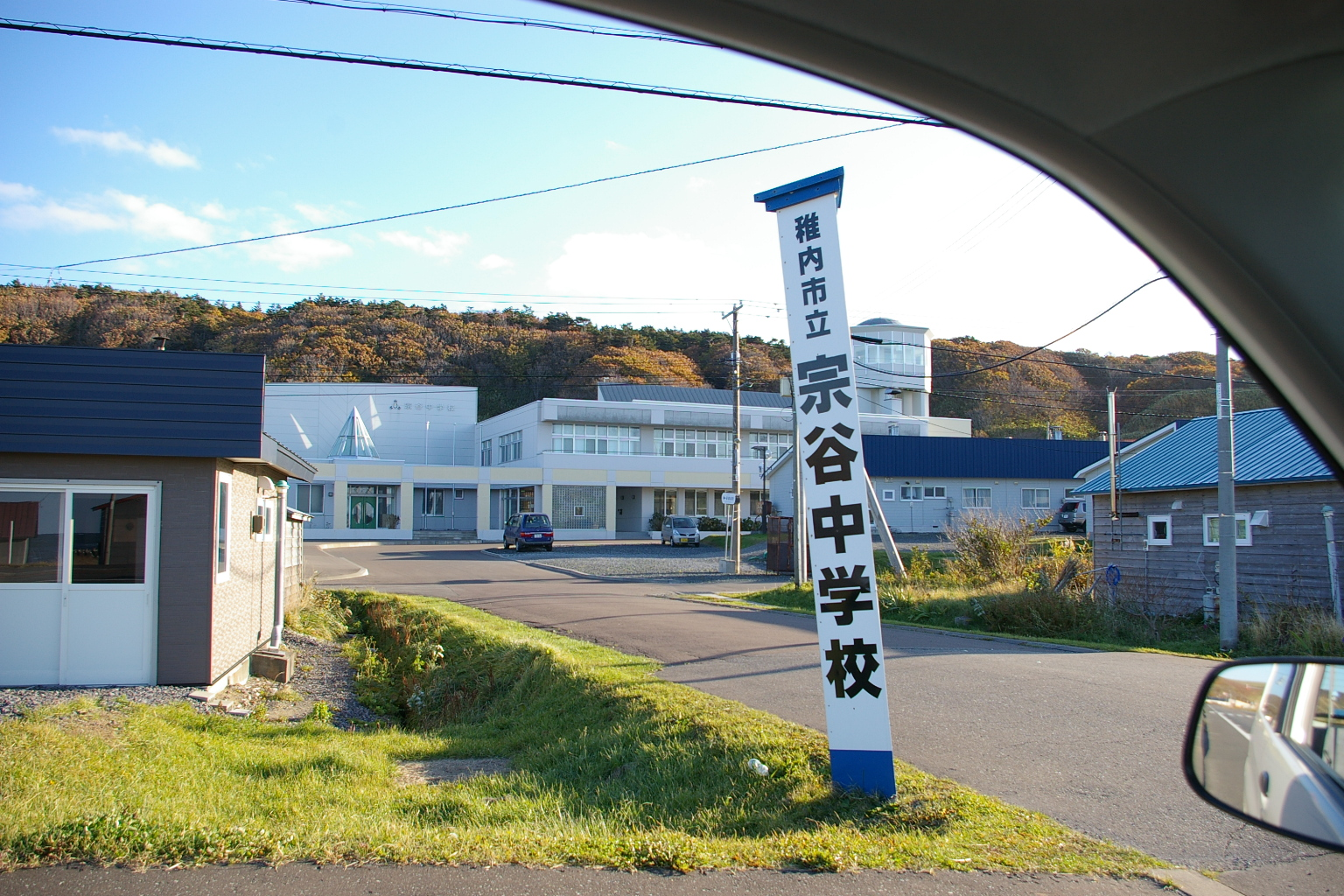
Sōya Junior High School, the northernmost junior high school

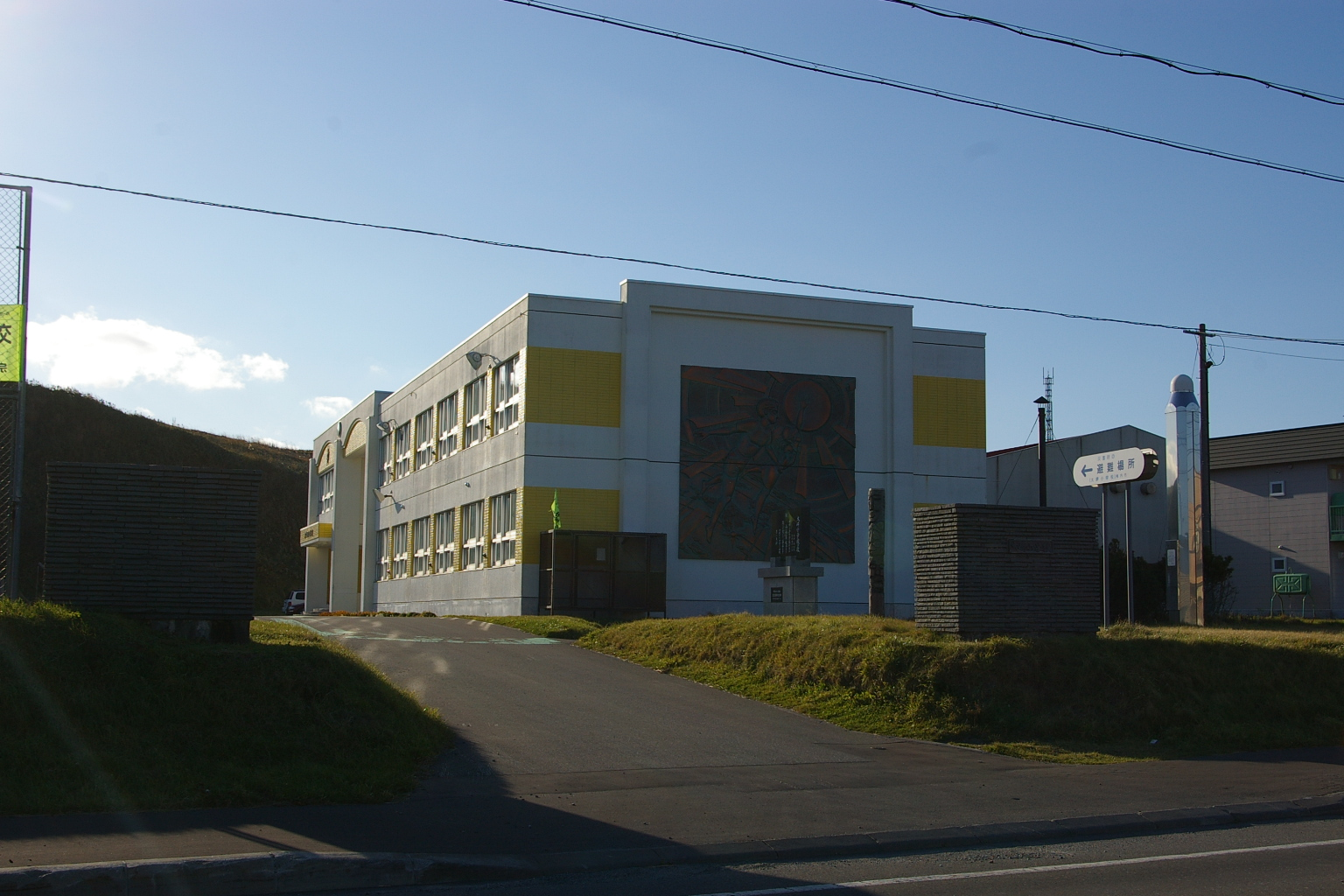
Ōmisaki Elementary School, the northernmost elementary school

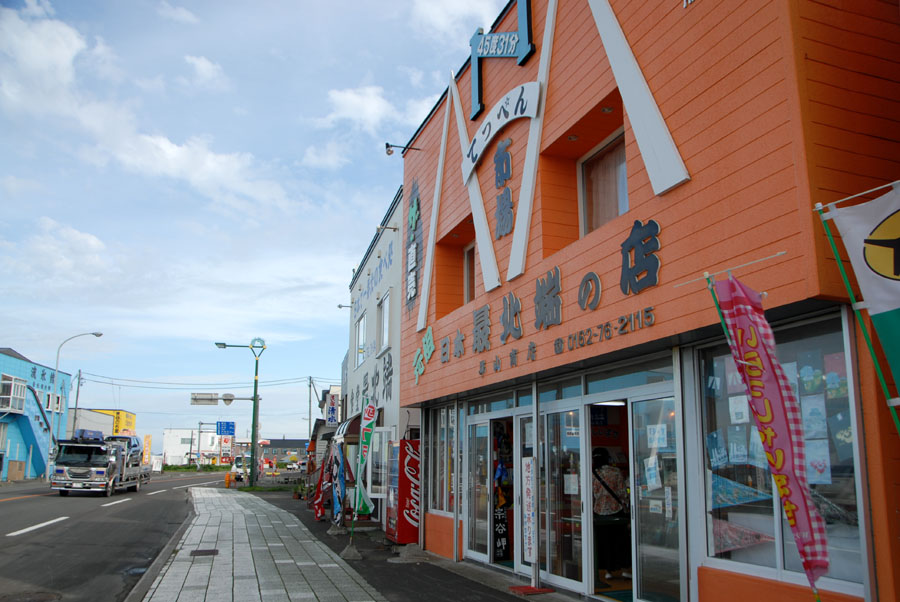
Vista of "northernmost" shops

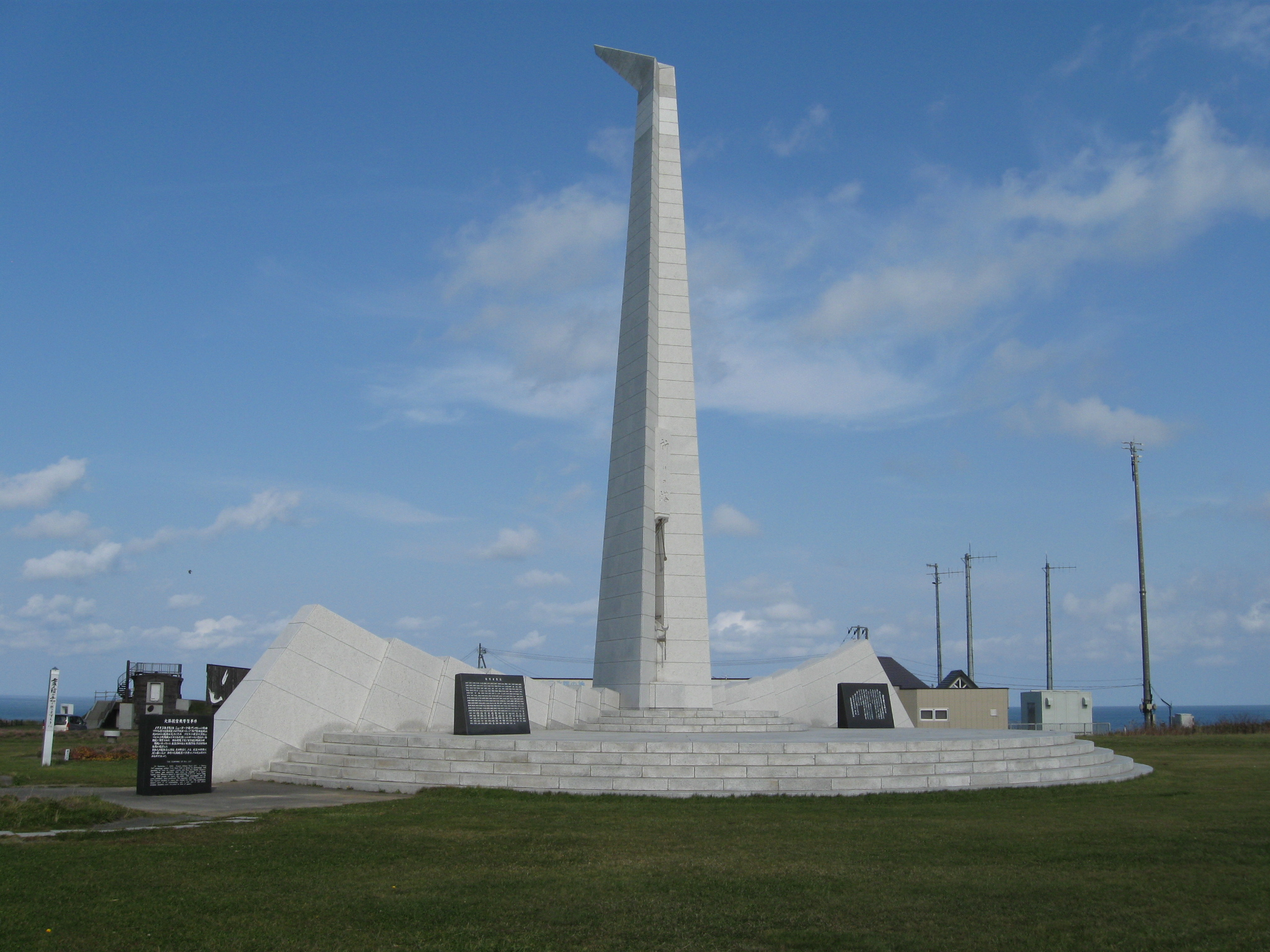
The Tower of Prayer

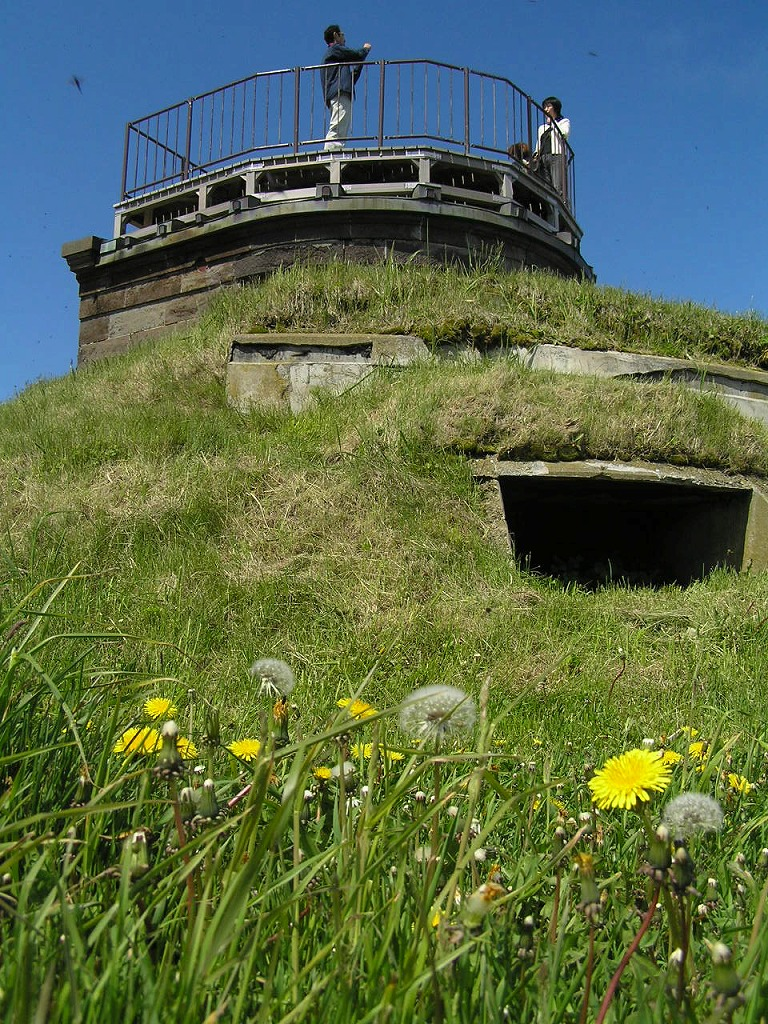
Old Navy Watch Tower (June 2006)

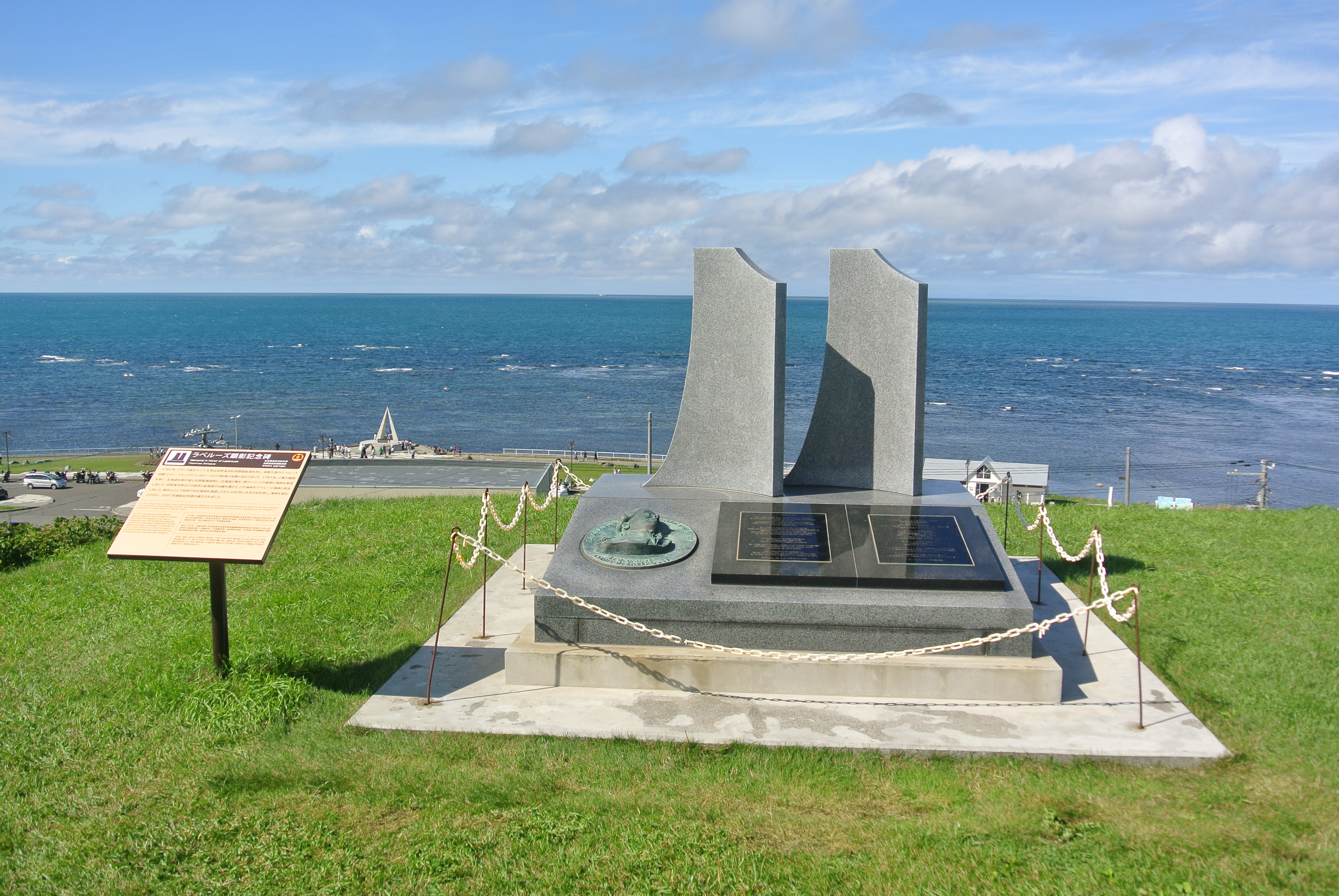
La Perouse monument

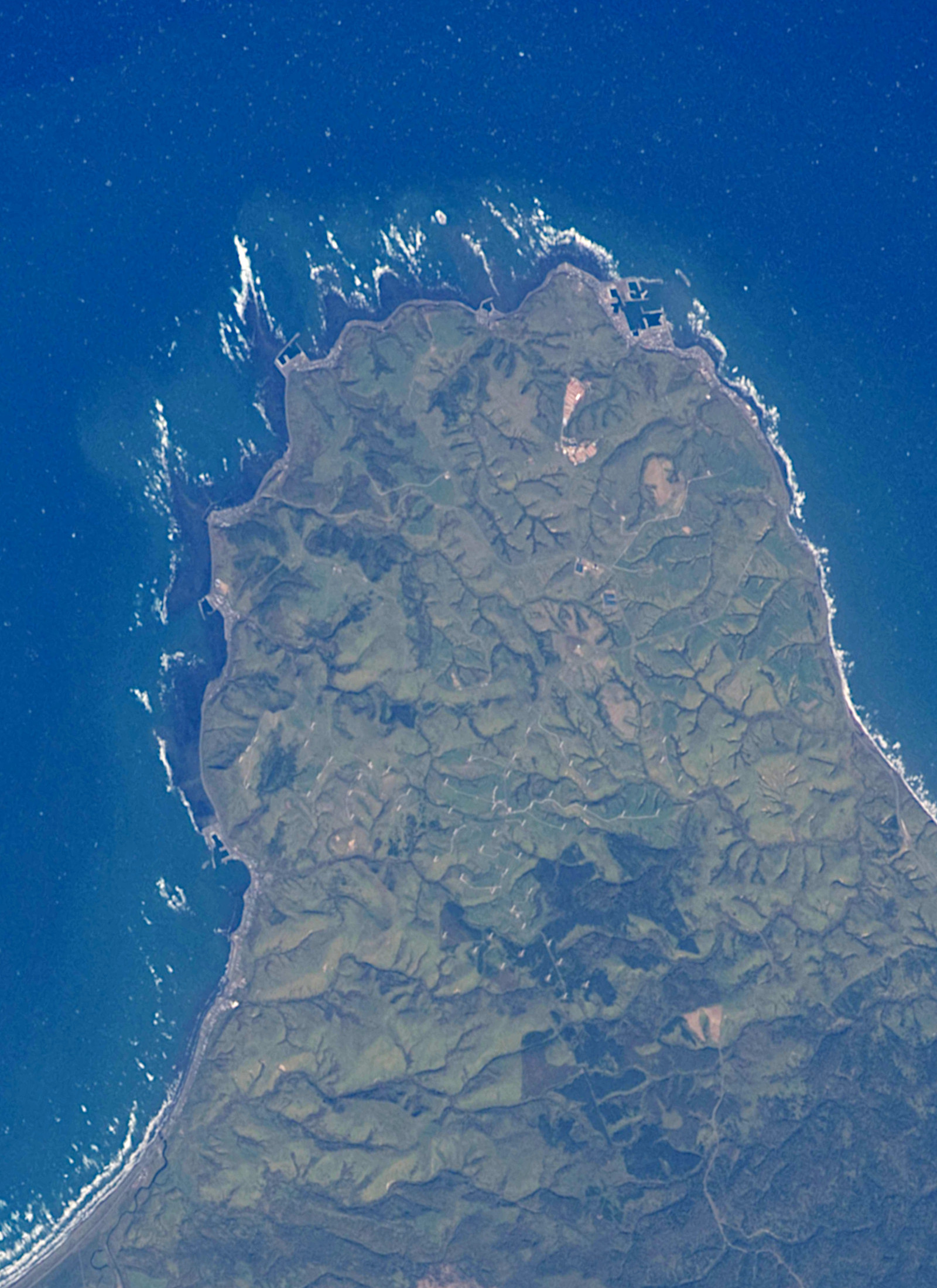
Satellite image of Cape Sōya (October 2009)

== See also ==
- Extreme points of Japan
