= Cape Koritsky =

Northernmost point of Iturup, Kuril Islands

Coordinates: 45°33′28″N 148°45′14″E

Cape Koritsky (Russian: Мыс Корицкий, Mys Koritsky) is the northernmost point of Iturup, one of the Kuril Islands. In Japanese, the cape is called either Cape Kamoiwakka (カモイワッカ岬, Kamoiwakka-misaki) or Cape Kamuiwakka (カムイワッカ岬, Kamuiwakka-misaki).

The Southern Kuril Islands, including Iturup, are currently administrated by Russia. However, Japan also claims these islands. Since the cape is the northernmost point of the Southern Kuriles, it is also the northernmost point under Japanese claim.

Under Russian administration, the cape is a part of Kurilsky District of Sakhalin Oblast. According to Japanese claim, the cape is a part of Shibetoro Village (蘂取村), Shibetoro District, Nemuro Subprefecture, Hokkaidō.

== See also ==
- Extreme points of Japan
