= Hachinohe mine =

Hachinohe Mine
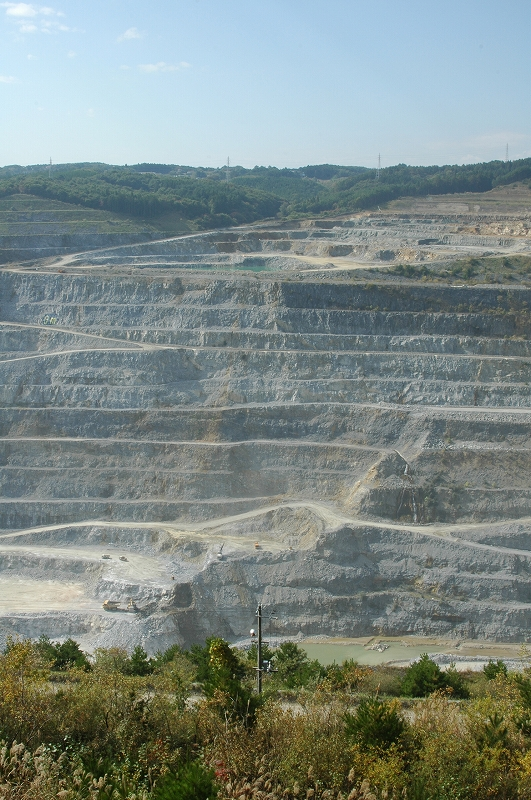
- Hachinohe Mine

- Location within Aomori Prefecture
- Location: Hachinohe, Aomori, Japan; 40°27′02″N 141°32′15″E
- Products: Limestone
- Type: Quarry (open pit)
- Greatest depth: 270 metres (890 ft)

The Hachinohe mine (八戸鉱山, Hachinohe Kōzan) is a limestone quarry in the city of Hachinohe, Aomori Prefecture, in the northern Tohoku region of northern Japan. It is operated by the Sumimetal Mining Company.

The mine is the lowest point in Japan at 170 metres (560 ft) below sea level, and digging still continues. The open pit has a north–south length of approximately 2 kilometers and an east–west width of 800 meters. The limestone excavated is transported by a 10 kilometer pipeline with belt conveyor to Port of Hachinohe.

The mine is locally nicknamed the "Hachinohe Canyon."

== See also ==
- Extreme points of Japan
