= Benten-jima (Wakkanai) =

Deserted island in Wakkanai, Hokkaido, Japan

Native name: 弁天島
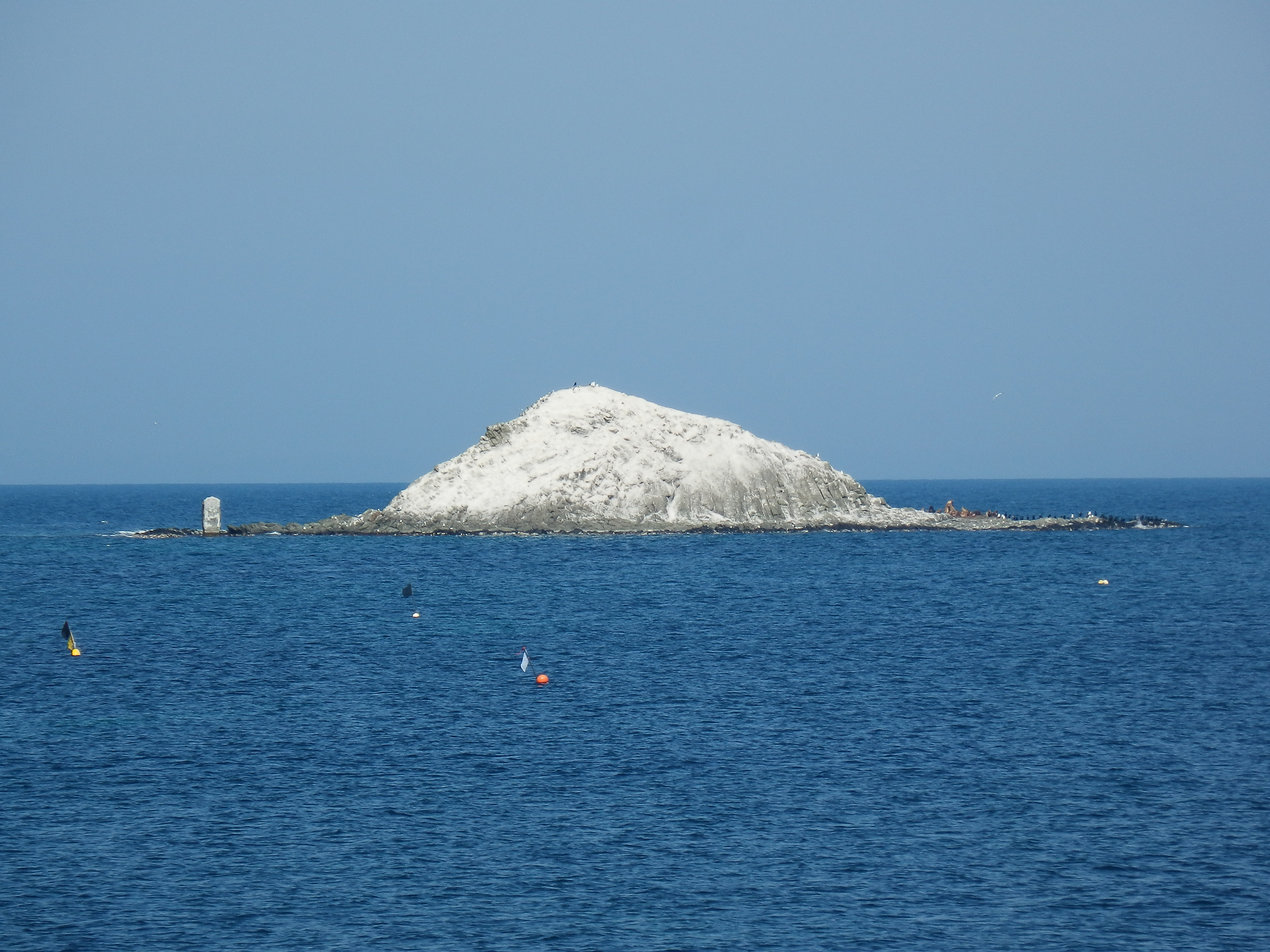

- Location within Japan

Geography
- Location: Sea of Japan (La Pérouse Strait)
- Coordinates: 45°31′35″N 141°55′09″E
- Area: 0.005 km^{2} (0.0019 sq mi)
- Coastline: .5 km (0.31 mi)
- Highest elevation: 20 m (70 ft)
- Highest point: unnamed point

Administration
- Japan
- Prefectures: Hokkaido
- Subprefecture: Sōya
- City: Wakkanai

Demographics
- Population: 0

Benten-jima (弁天島) is a small deserted island west by northwest of Cape Sōya, Wakkanai, Hokkaidō, Japan. It is the northernmost piece of land under Japanese control. The island is 1 km (0.54 nmi) north of Sannai settlement. Another island called Hira-shima (平島) lies southeast of Benten-jima.

Benten-jima is 0.5 hectares (1.2 acres) in area, its perimeter is roughly 500 metres (1,600 ft), and its highest point is 20 metres (66 ft) above sea level. It is named after Benzaiten, once enshrined on the island. The wildlife includes many seabirds, Steller sea lions, kombu kelp, and sea urchins; it has been recognised as an Important Bird Area (IBA) by BirdLife International because it supports a large breeding colony of black-tailed gulls.

According to local Ainu folklore, Benten-jima was considered the home of a spirit and connected with nearby Hira-shima in stories about marriage and supernatural treasures.

== Photos ==
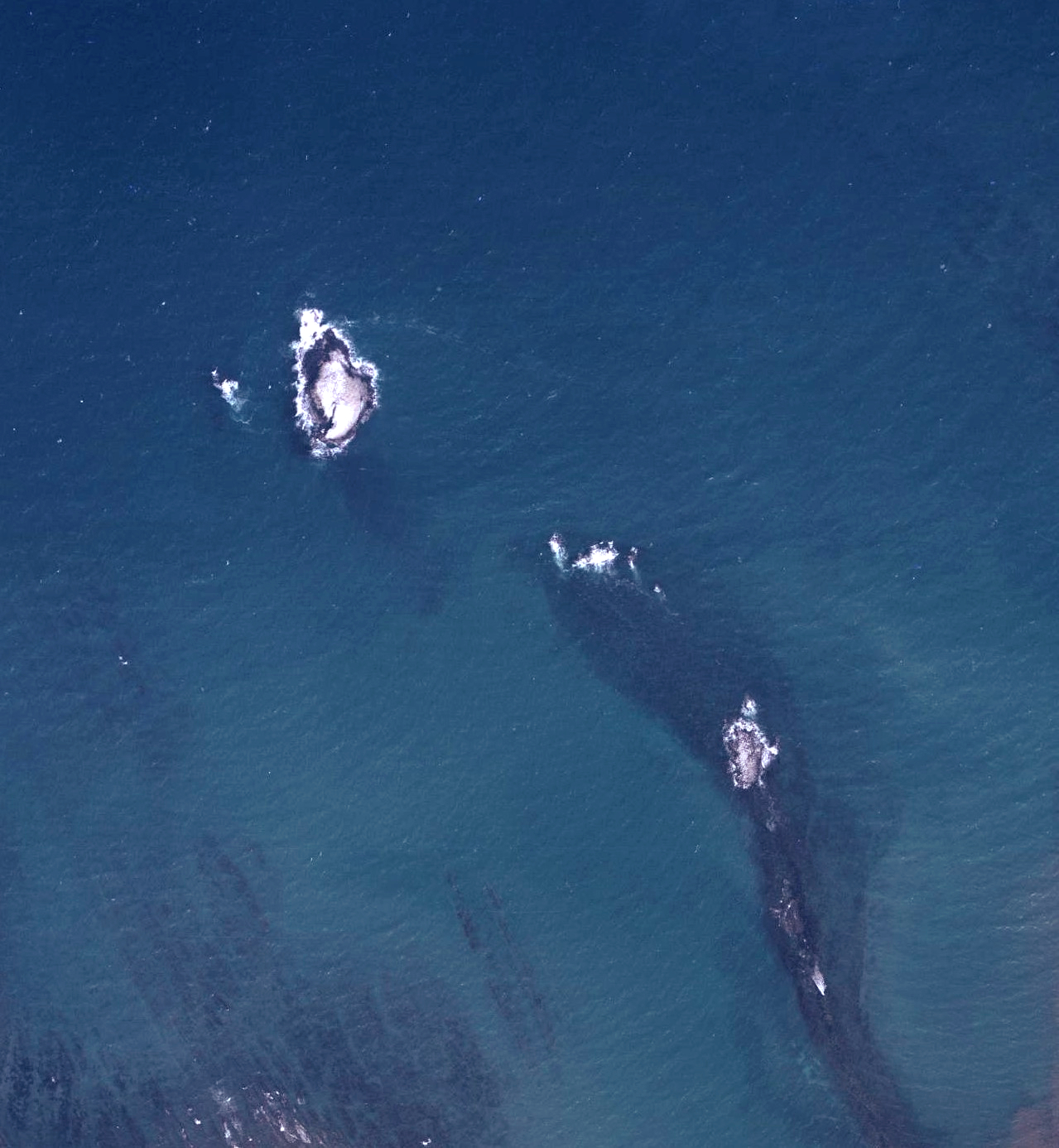
Aerial photo of Benten-jima from the Geospatial Information Authority of Japan

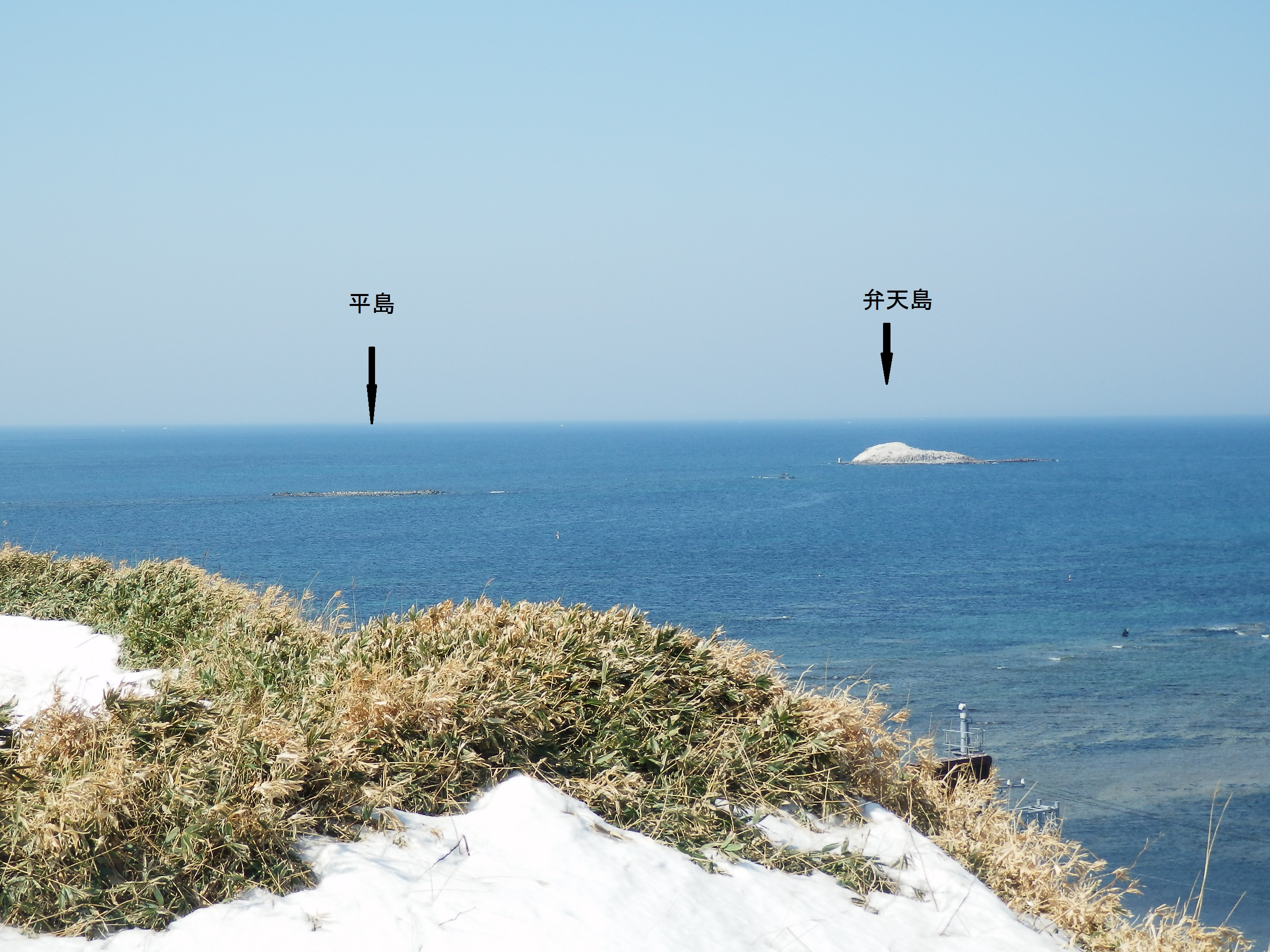
Benten-jima (弁天島) and Hira-shima (平島) seen from Cape Sōya

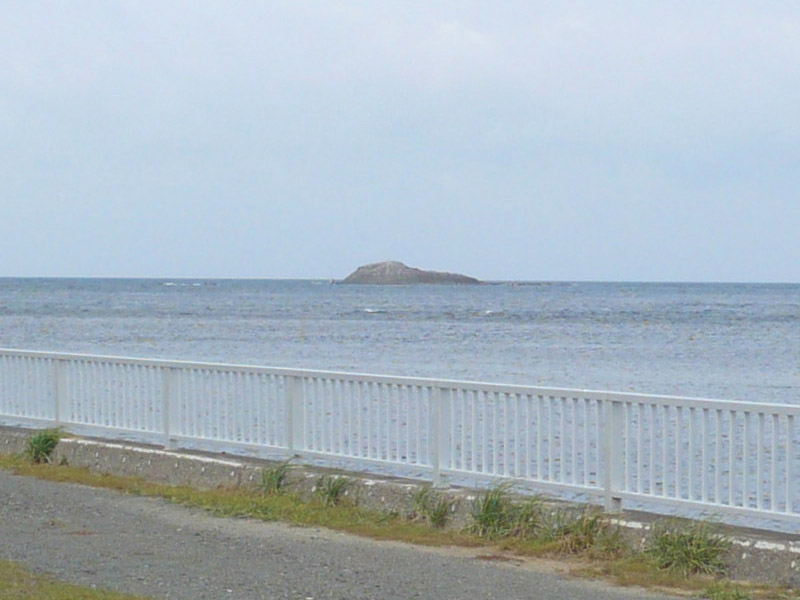
Benten-jima, viewed from Cape Sōya

== See also ==
- Geography of Japan
- Japanese archipelago
- Extreme points of Japan
- Desert island
- List of islands
