= Cape Shirakami =

Geographic point in Hokkaidō, Japan

Coordinates: 41°23′50.5″N 140°11′50.6″E

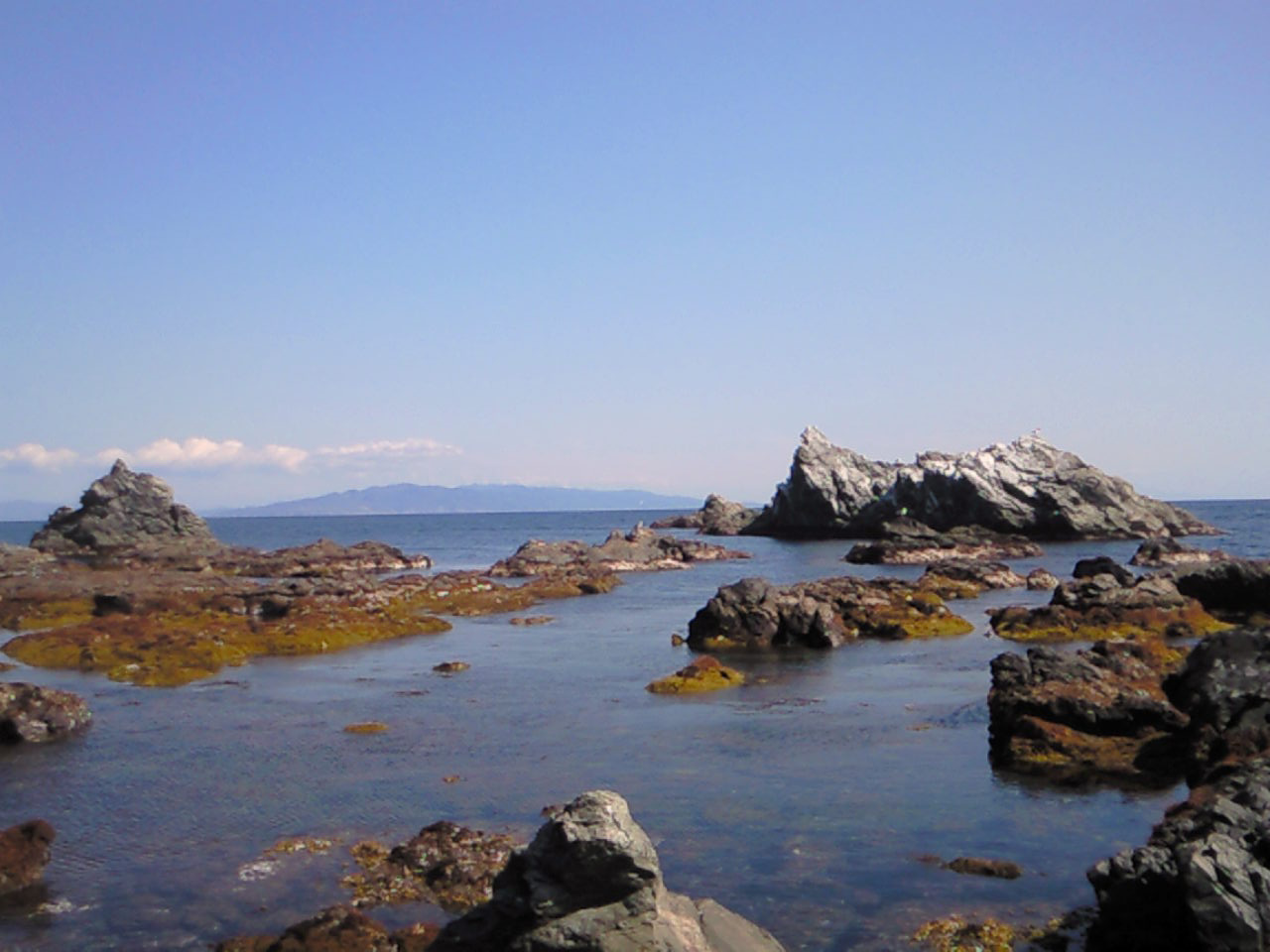
Cape Shirakami

Cape Shirakami (白神岬, Shirakami-misaki) is a cape located on the southernmost tip of the Oshima Peninsula in Matsumae, Hokkaidō, Japan. It is the southernmost point of Hokkaidō.

There are rugged, uniquely shaped rocks and sea cliffs. From the peak, on clear days, the view extends to Cape Tappi, the northernmost point on the Tsugaru Peninsula across the shore. During spring and autumn, this area becomes a resting spot for migrating birds and is a recommended area for bird watchers to visit. Depending on the season, one can spot approximately 300 out of the over 500 wild bird varieties known to inhabit Japan.

== See also ==
- Extreme points of Japan
