= List of extreme points of Japan =

Most prominent and distant parts of the East Asian country's physical boundaries

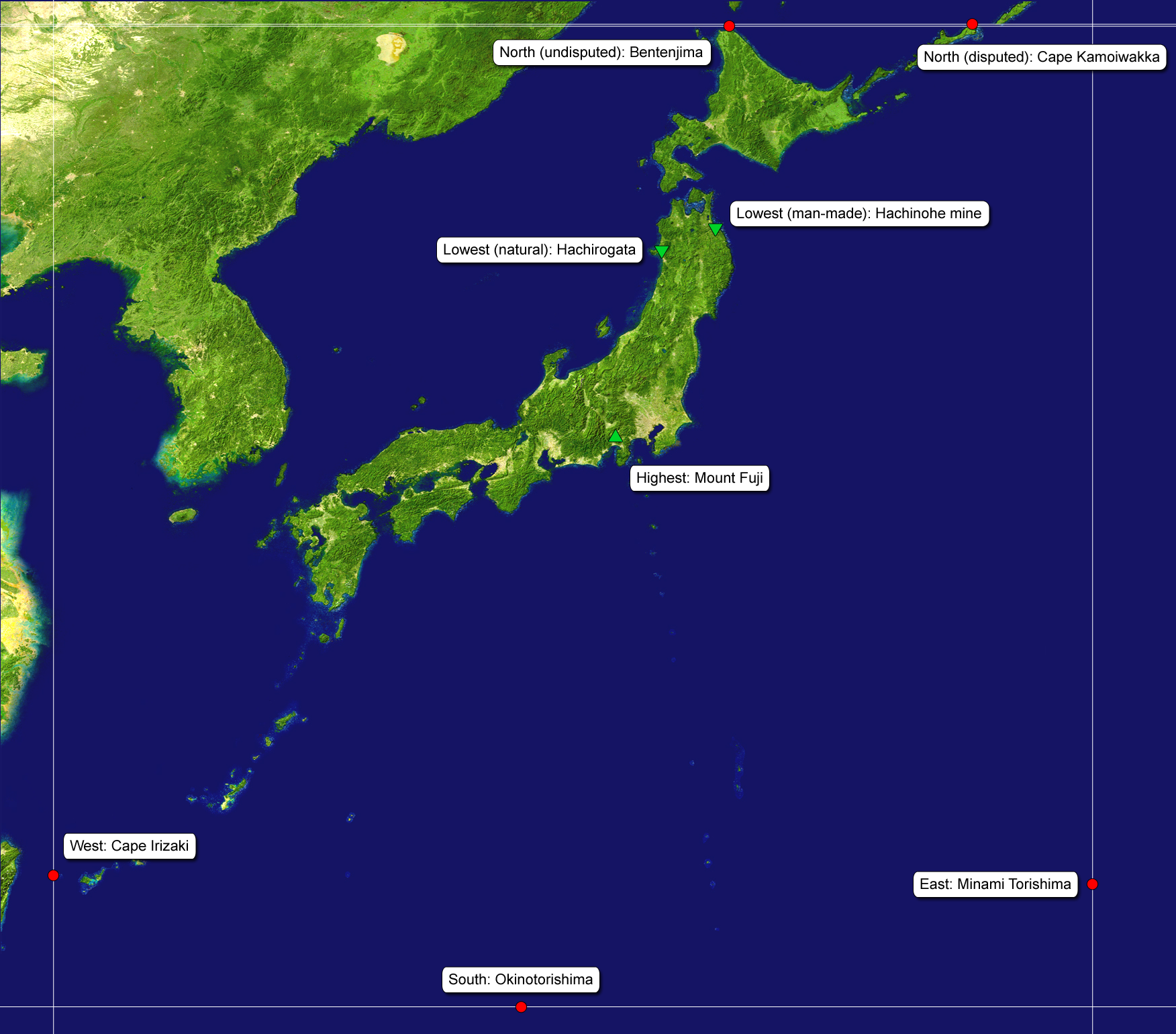
Extreme points of Japan marked on the map

The extreme points of Japan include the coordinates that are the farthest north, south, east and west in Japan, and the ones that are at the highest and the lowest elevations in the country. Japan's northernmost point is disputed, because Japan considers it to be on Iturup, an island de facto governed by Russia. The southernmost point is Okinotorishima; the westernmost is Tuishi near Yonaguni Island in Okinawa Prefecture, and the easternmost is Minami Torishima. The highest point in Japan is the summit of Mount Fuji at 3,776.24 m (12,389 ft). At 150 m (492 ft) below sea level, the bottom of Hachinohe mine is the country's lowest point. The surface of Hachirōgata is Japan's lowest natural point at 4 m (13 ft) below sea level. All extreme locations are uninhabited.

Japan extends from 20° to 45° north latitude (Okinotorishima to Benten-jima) and from 122° to 153° east longitude (Yonaguni to Minami Torishima). The coordinates used in this article are sourced from Google Earth, which makes use of the World Geodetic System (WGS) 84.

== Extreme points ==
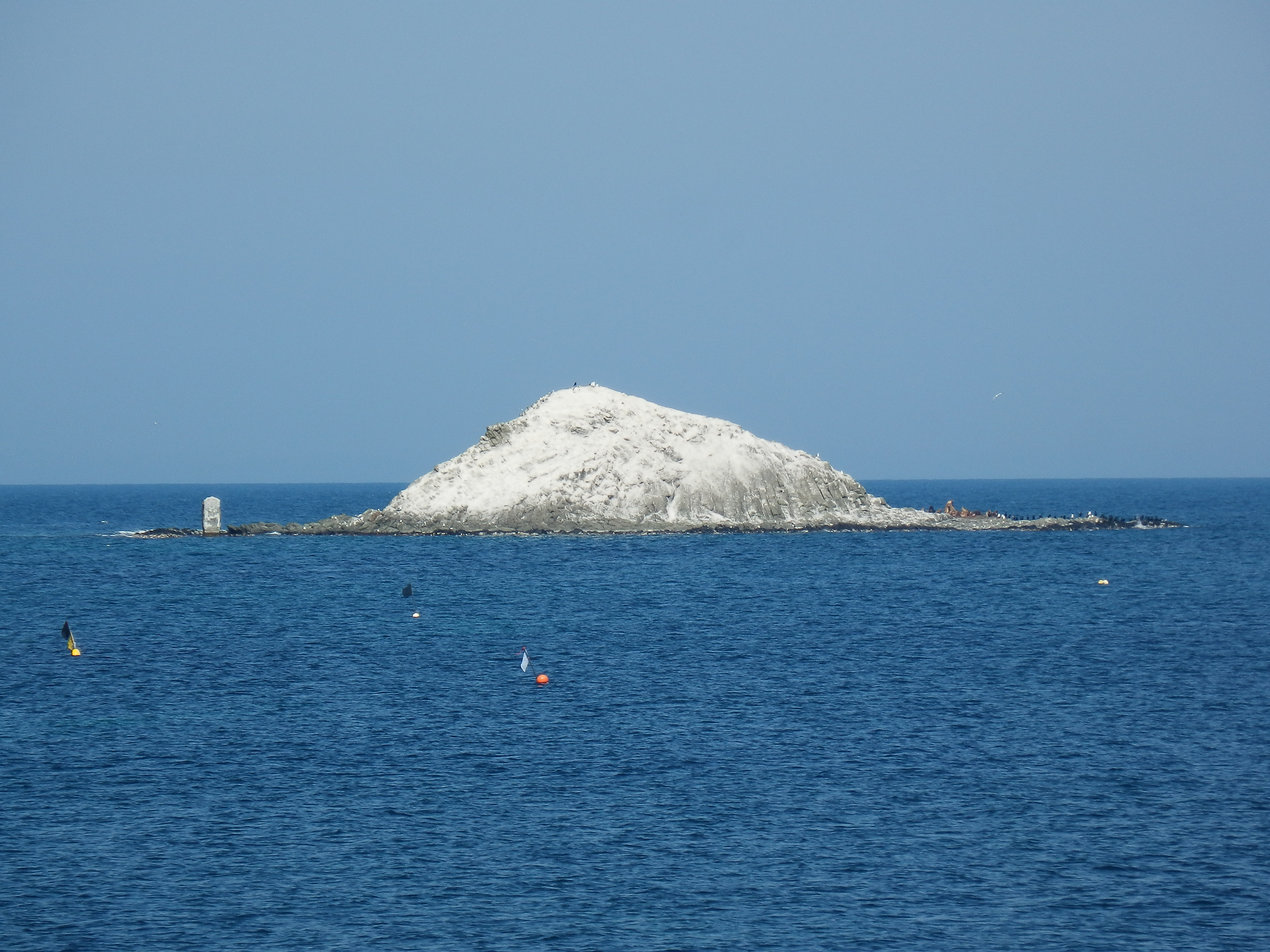
Benten Island, northernmost point under effective Japanese control

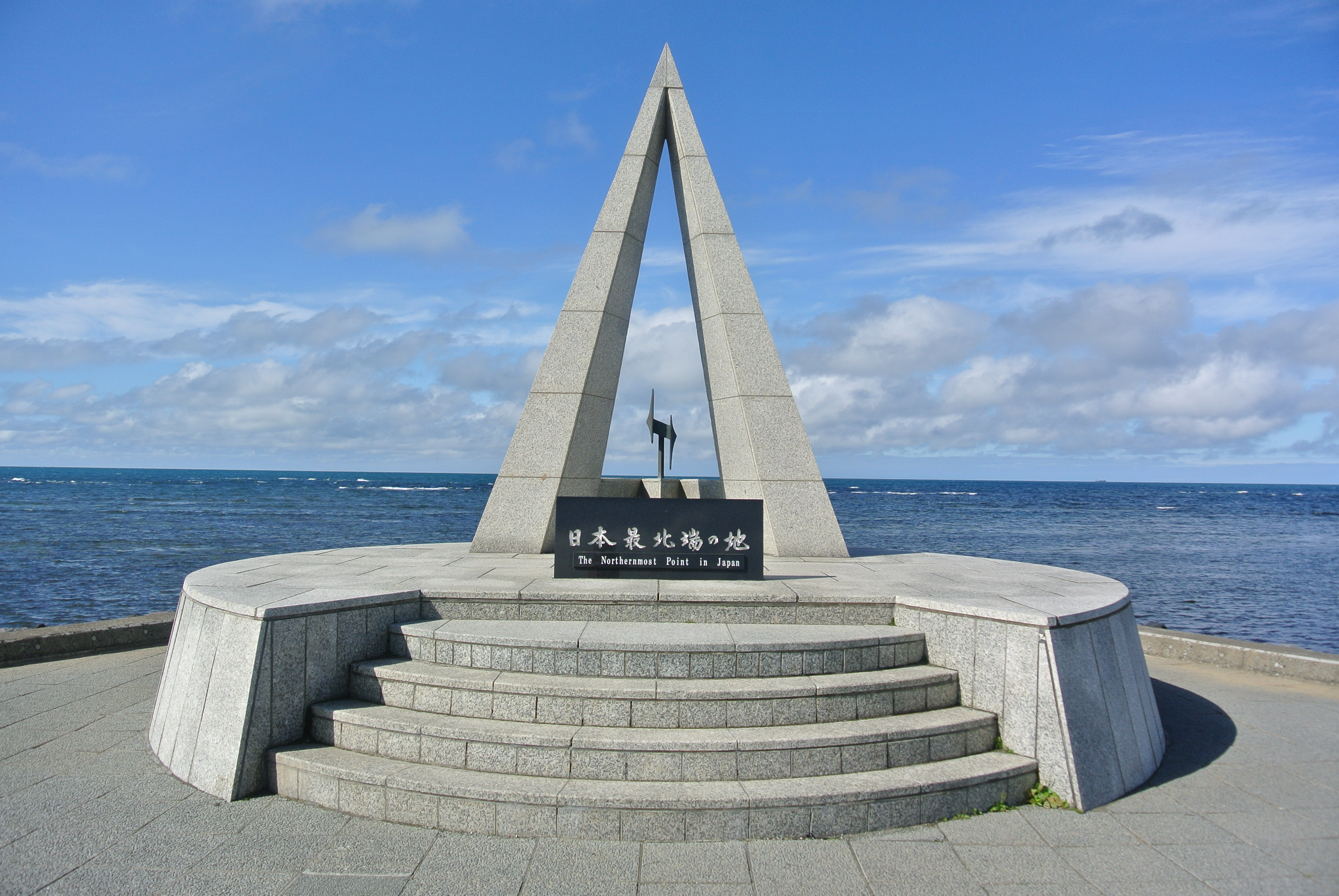
A monument indicates the northernmost point of Japan at Cape Sōya on Hokkaido.

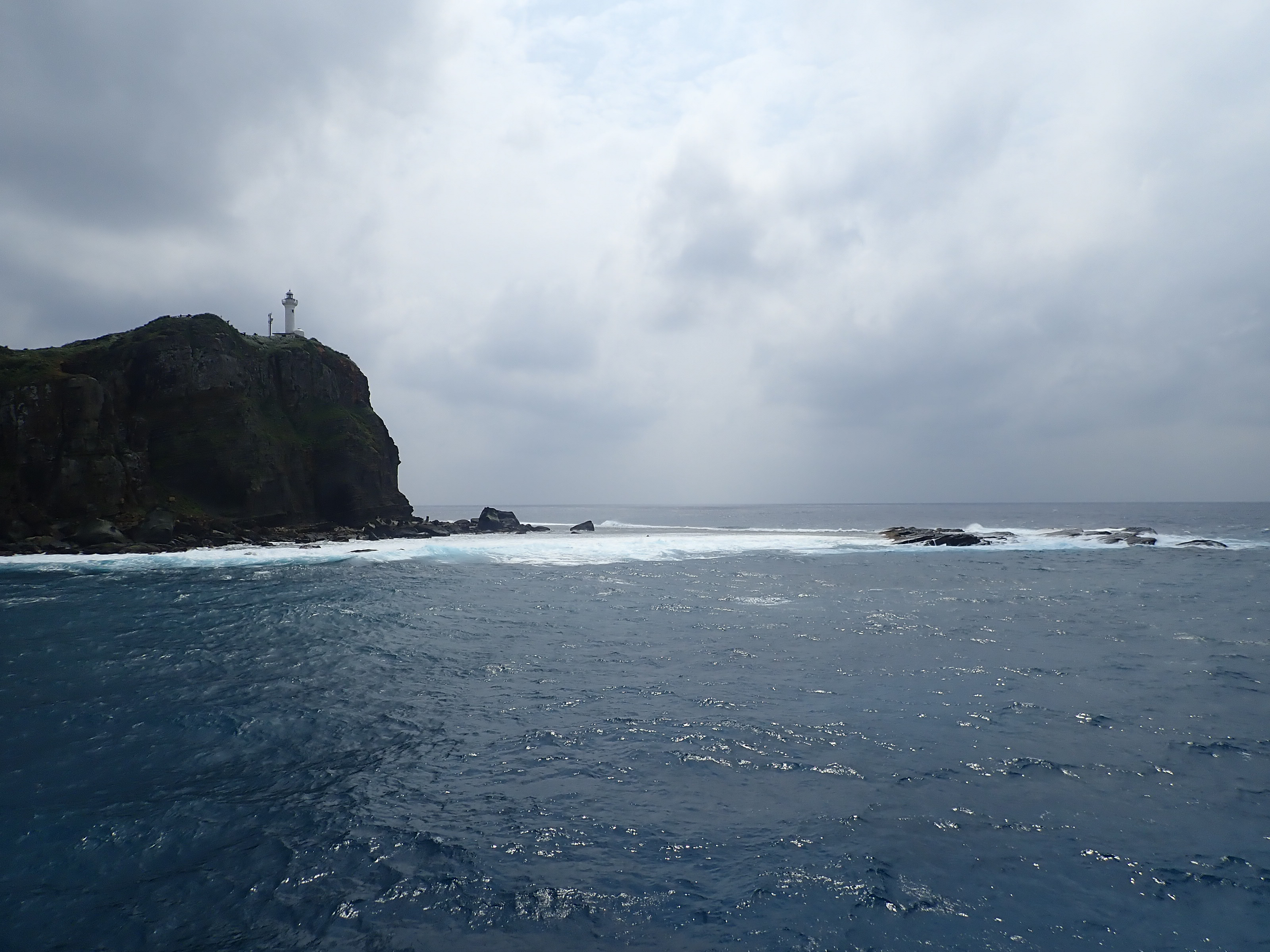
Tuishi, Japan's westernmost point off Yonaguni Island

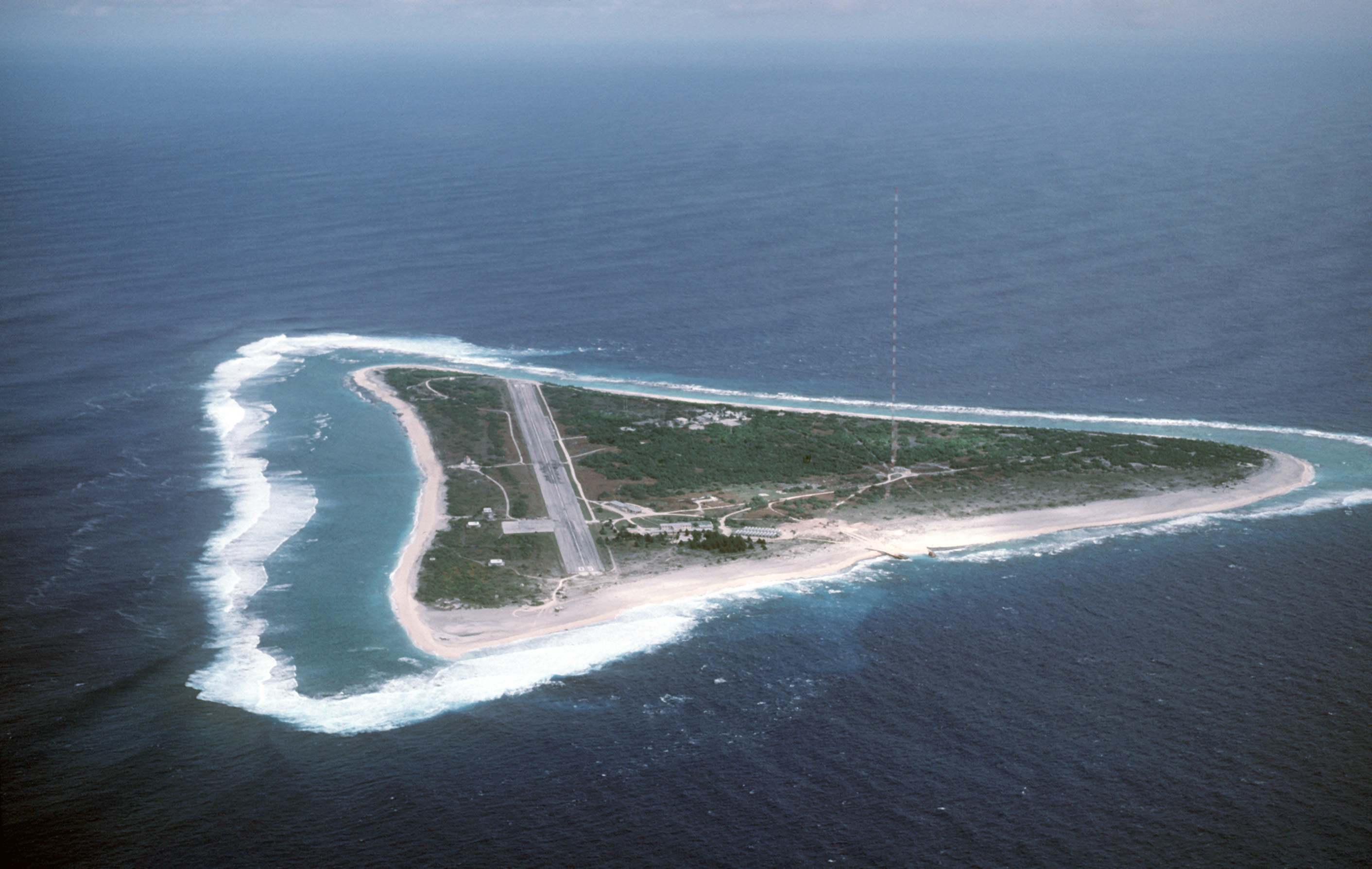
Japan's easternmost point lies on Minami Torishima in the Pacific Ocean.

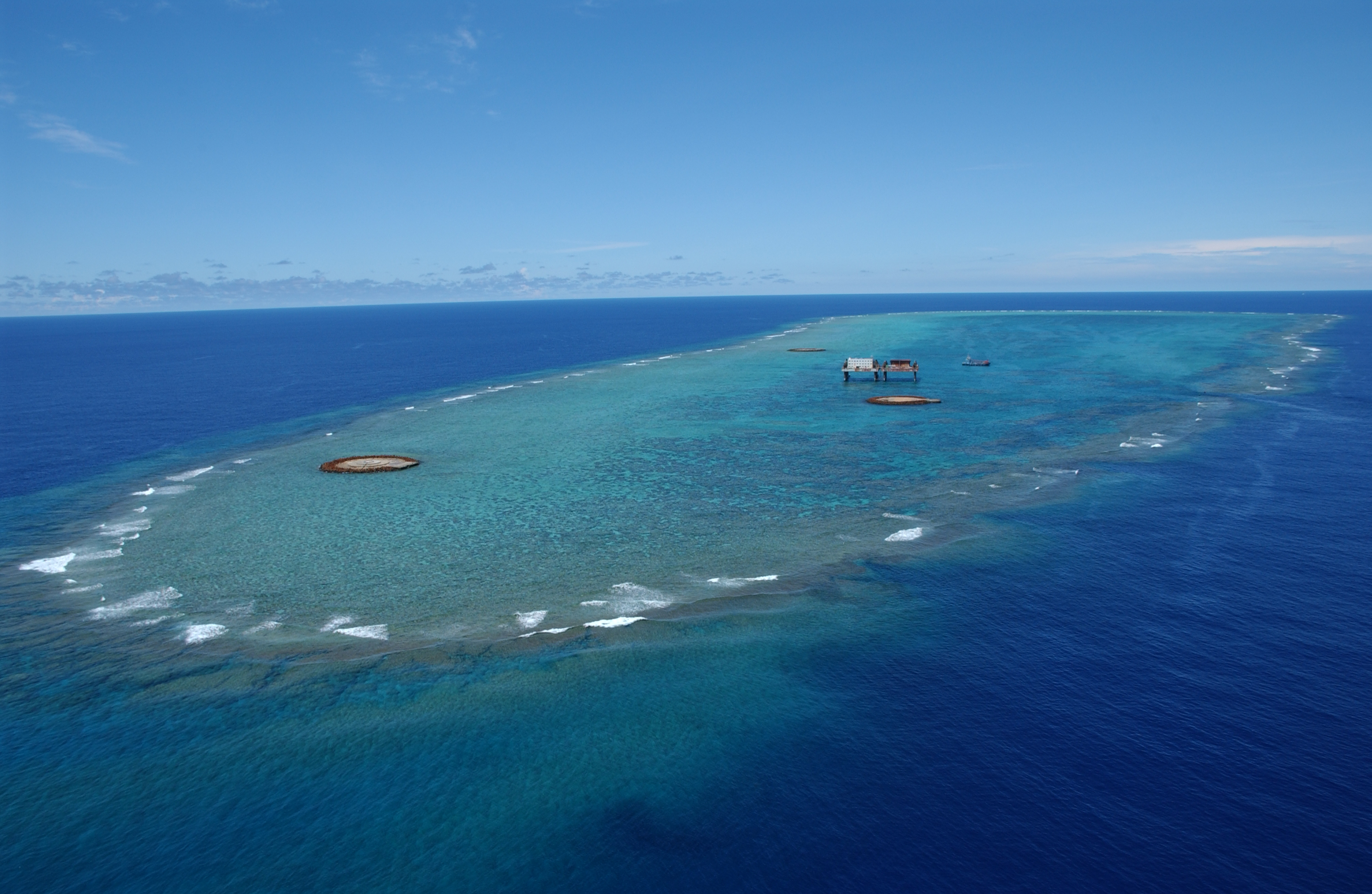
Okinotori Island, Japan's southernmost point

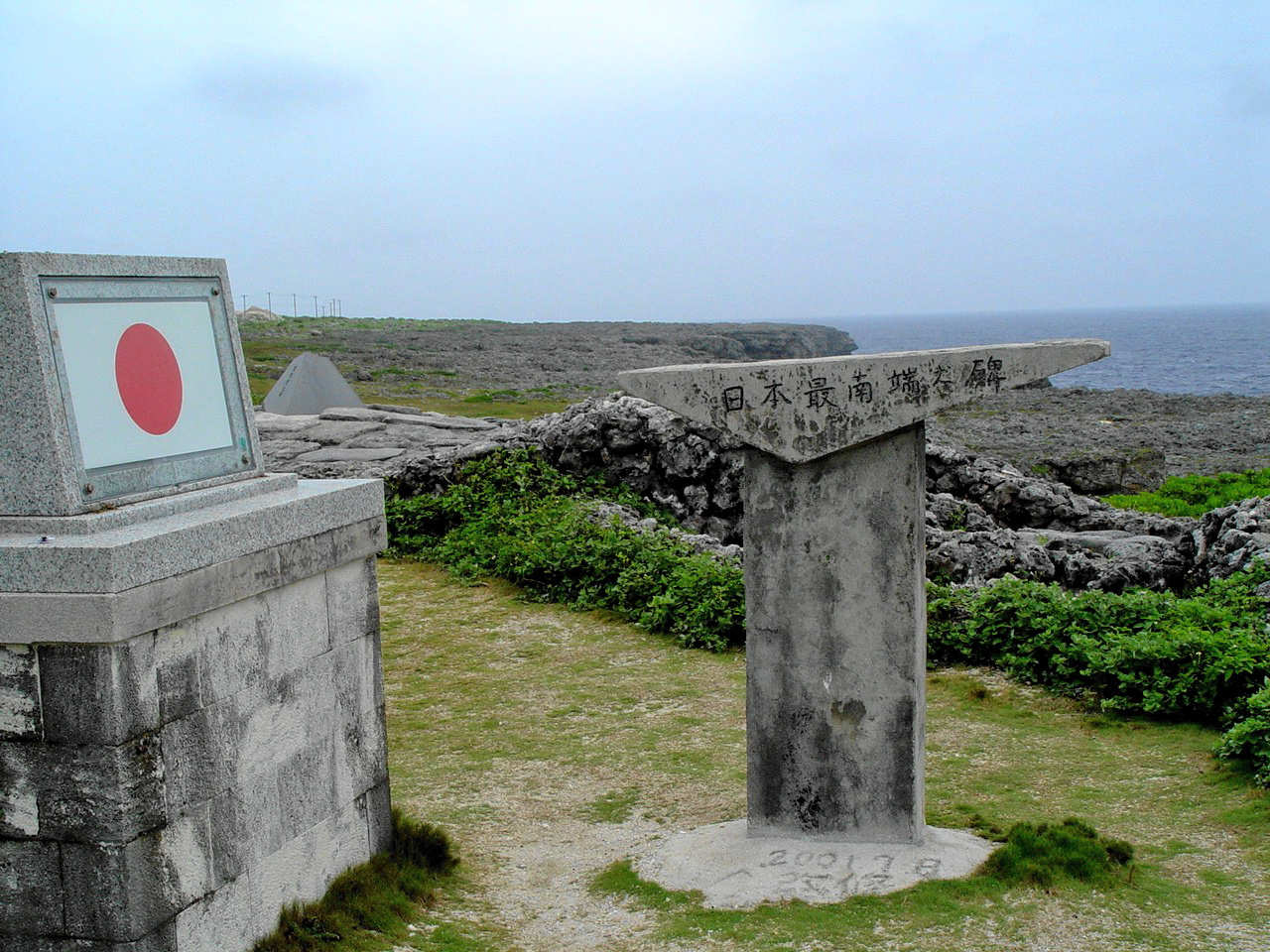
Hateruma Island, Japan's southernmost inhabited location

The northernmost point that Japan claims lies on the disputed island of Iturup. Japan's claim to the three southernmost islands of the Kuril Islands is disputed by Russia, which de facto controls the islands. This list provides the northernmost point as claimed by Japan as well as the northernmost undisputed point in Japan.

=== Overall ===
Heading	Location	Prefecture	Bordering entity	Coordinates^{[a]}	Ref.
North (disputed)	Cape Kamoiwakka	Hokkaidō^{[b]}	Sea of Okhotsk	45°33′26″N 148°45′09″E	
North (undisputed)	Benten-jima	Hokkaidō	La Pérouse Strait	45°31′38″N 141°55′06″E	
South	Okinotorishima^{[c]}	Tokyo	Philippine Sea	20°25′31″N 136°04′11″E	
East	Minami Torishima	Tokyo	Pacific Ocean	24°16′59″N 153°59′11″E	
West	Tuishi	Okinawa	East China Sea	24°27′5″N 122°55′57″E	

=== Five main islands ===
The five main islands of Japan are Honshū, Hokkaidō, Shikoku, Kyūshū and Okinawa. All of these points are accessible to the public.

Heading	Location	Prefecture	Bordering entity	Coordinates^{[a]}	Ref
North	Cape Sōya	Hokkaidō	La Pérouse Strait	45°31′22″N 141°56′11″E	
South	Cape Arasaki	Okinawa	Miyako Strait	26°04′28″N 127°40′38″E	
East	Cape Nosappu	Hokkaidō	Pacific Ocean	43°23′06″N 145°49′03″E	
West	Naha Airport	Okinawa	East China Sea	26°12′22″N 127°37′50″E	

==== Hokkaidō ====
Heading	Location	Prefecture	Bordering entity	Coordinates^{[a]}	Ref
North	Cape Sōya	Hokkaidō	La Pérouse Strait	45°31′22″N 141°56′11″E	
South	Cape Shirakami	Hokkaidō	Tsugaru Strait	41°23′51″N 140°11′51″E	
East	Cape Nosappu	Hokkaidō	Pacific Ocean	43°23′06″N 145°49′03″E	
West	Cape Obana	Hokkaidō	Sea of Japan	42°18′11″N 139°46′01″E	

==== Honshū ====
Heading	Location	Prefecture	Bordering entity	Coordinates^{[a]}	Ref
North	Cape Ōma	Aomori	Tsugaru Strait	41°32′47″N 140°54′45″E	
South	Cape Shionomisaki	Wakayama	Pacific Ocean	33°25′59″N 135°45′45″E	
East	Cape Todo	Iwate	Pacific Ocean	39°32′53″N 142°04′21″E	
West	Cape Bisha	Yamaguchi	Tsushima Strait	34°06′39″N 130°51′38″E	

==== Shikoku ====
Heading	Location	Prefecture	Bordering entity	Coordinates^{[a]}	Ref
North	Cape Takei	Kagawa	Bungo Channel	34°24′01″N 134°08′12″E	
South	Cape Ashizuri	Kochi	Philippine Sea	32°43′19″N 133°00′19″E	
East	Cape Gamōda	Tokushima	Kii Channel	33°50′03″N 134°45′00″E	
West	Cape Sada	Ehime	Hōyo Strait	33°20′38″N 132°00′45″E	

==== Kyūshū ====
Heading	Location	Prefecture	Bordering entity	Coordinates^{[a]}	Ref
North	Tachinoura Container Terminal	Fukuoka	Kanmon Straits	33°58′12″N 131°00′08″E	
South	Cape Sata	Kagoshima	East China Sea	30°59′40″N 130°39′37″E	
East	Cape Tsurumi	Oita	Hōyo Strait	32°44′54″N 132°05′04″E	
West	Kōzakihana	Nagasaki	East China Sea	33°12′33″N 129°33′18″E	

==== Okinawa ====
Heading	Location	Prefecture	Bordering entity	Coordinates^{[a]}	Ref
North	Cape Hedo	Okinawa	East China Sea, Pacific Ocean	26°52′24″N 128°15′53″E	
South	Cape Arasaki	Okinawa	Miyako Strait	26°04′28″N 127°40′38″E	
East	Sedakazaki	Okinawa	Pacific Ocean	26°44′58″N 128°19′37″E	
West	Naha Airport	Okinawa	East China Sea	26°12′22″N 127°37′50″E	

== Extreme altitudes ==
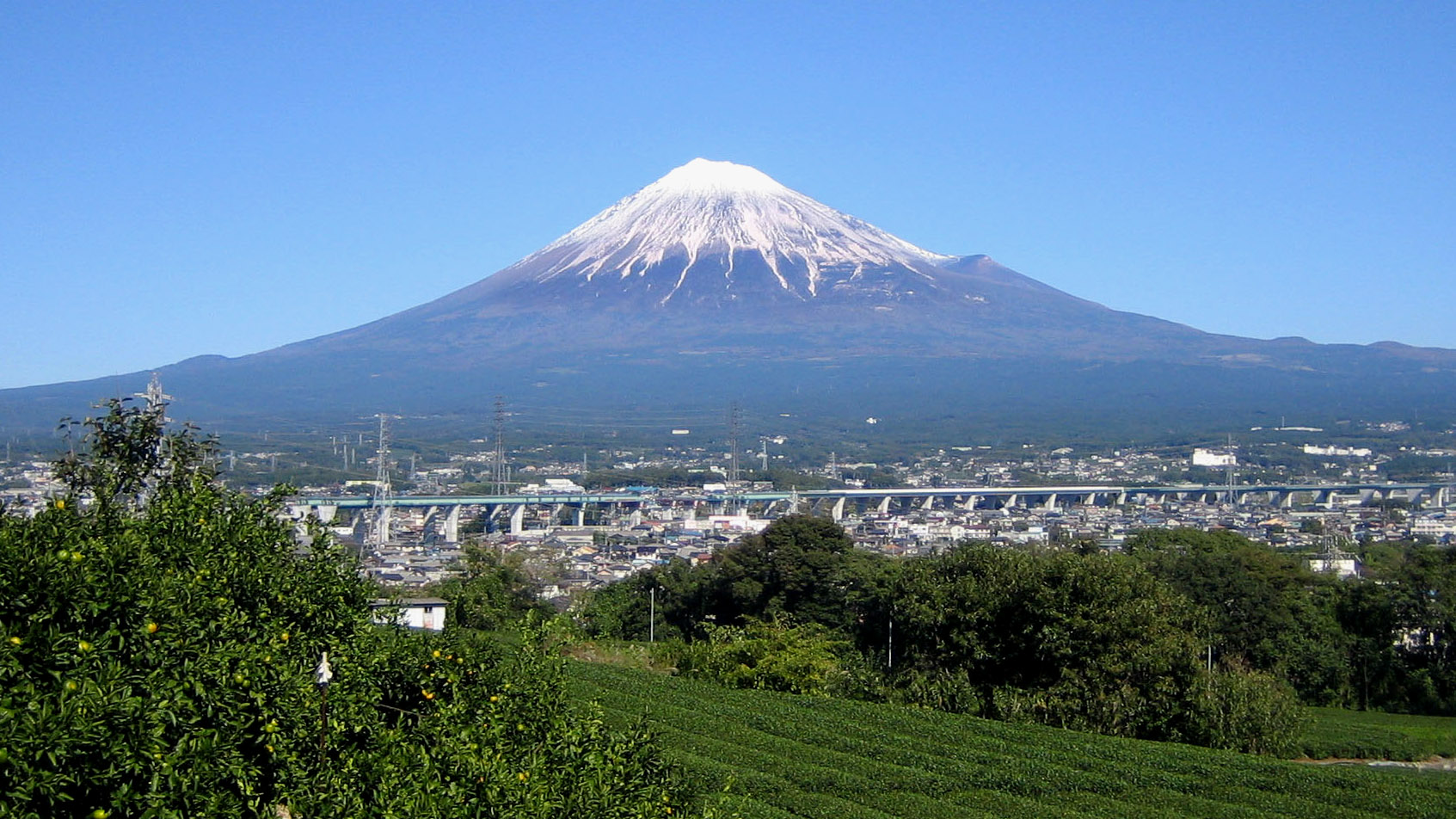
The summit of Mount Fuji is the highest point in Japan.

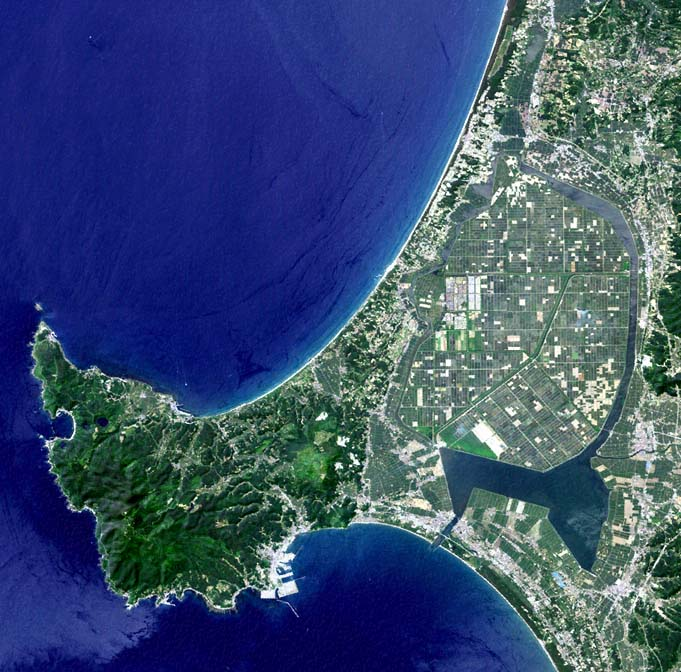
Hachirogata is the lowest natural point in Japan.

Extremity	Name	Altitude	Prefecture	Coordinates^{[a]}	Ref.
Highest	Mount Fuji	3,776 m (12,388 ft)	Yamanashi	35°21′29″N 138°43′52″E	
Lowest (man-made)	Hachinohe mine	−170 m (−558 ft)	Aomori	40°27′10″N 141°32′16″E	
Lowest (natural)	Hachirōgata	−4 m (−13 ft)	Akita	39°54′50″N 140°01′15″E	

== See also ==
- Geography of Japan
- Japanese archipelago
- List of Japanese islands
- Extreme points of Asia
- Kuril Islands dispute

== Notes ==
- ^{^a} Coordinates obtained from Google Earth. Google Earth makes use of the WGS84 geodetic reference system.
- ^{^b} Although Japan claims this island as part of Hokkaido, this territory is disputed and Iturup is currently under Russian administration.
- ^{^c} The monument marking the southernmost point of Japan is located in Haterume, because of the remote location of Okinotorishima.
