= Mining in Japan =

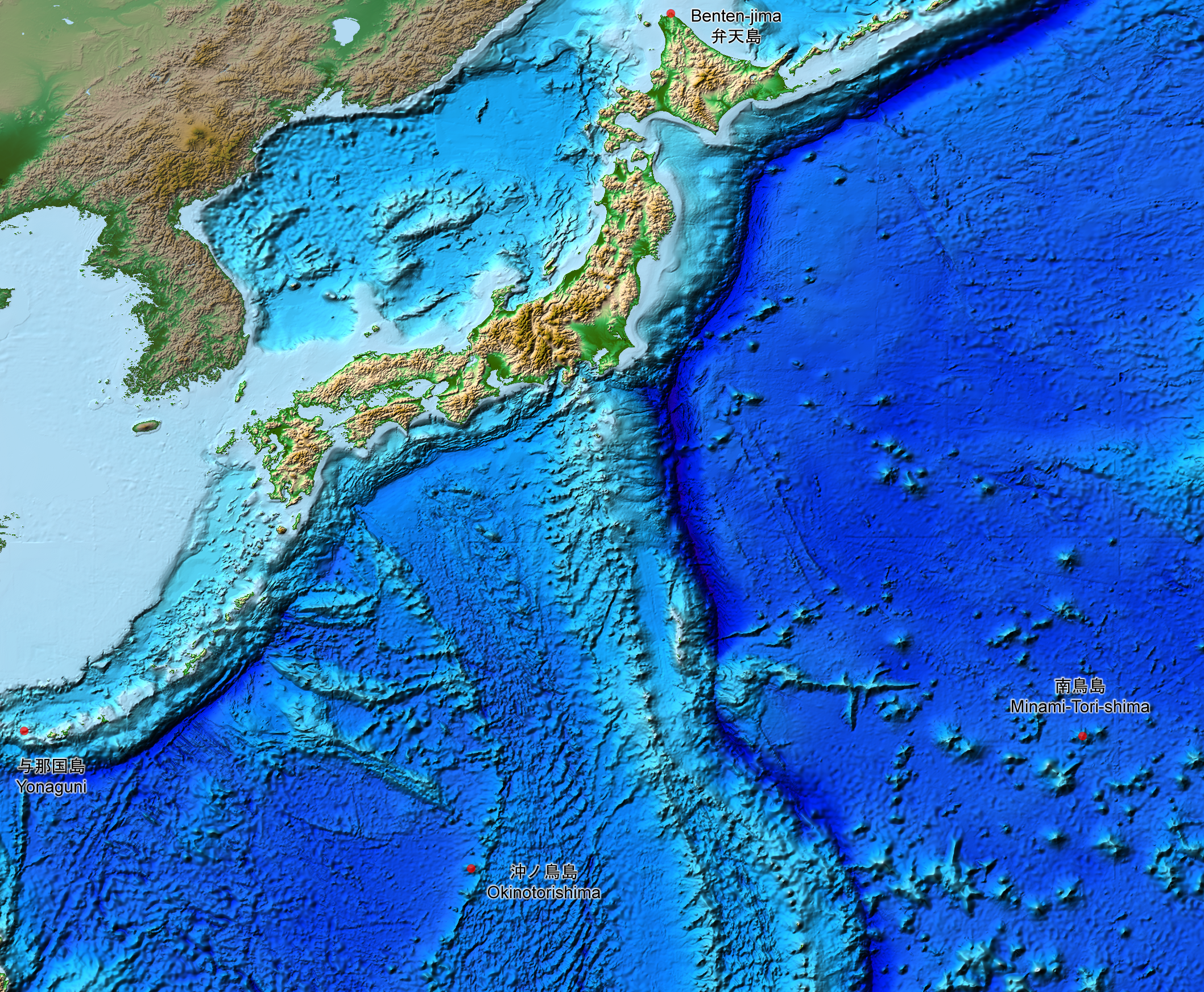
Japanese archipelago and the seabed

Mining in Japan is minimal because Japan does not possess many on-shore mineral resources. Many of the on-shore minerals have already been mined to the point that it has become less expensive to import minerals. There are small deposits of coal, oil, iron and minerals in the Japanese archipelago. Japan is scarce in critical natural resources and has been heavily dependent on imported energy and raw materials. There are major deep sea mineral resources in the seabed of Japan. These are not mined yet due to technological obstacles for deep sea mining.

In 2019, Japan was the second largest world producer of iodine, fourth largest worldwide producer of bismuth, the world's ninth largest producer of sulfur and the 10th largest producer of gypsum.

== History ==
The Japanese archipelago is in a subduction zone with great tectonic plate movement. The Philippine Sea Plate moves beneath the continental Amurian Plate and Okinawa Plate to the south. The oceanic Pacific Plate moves under the continental Okhotsk Plate to the north. These subduction plates have pulled Japan eastward and opened the Sea of Japan by back-arc spreading around 15 million years ago. It has uplifted the Japanese islands and created three oceanic trenches: the Kuril–Kamchatka Trench, Japan Trench and Izu–Ogasawara Trench. This has produced a wide variety of mineral resources, though not in large quantities on-shore. Most resources are in the seabed.

The earliest recorded silver production in Japan occurred on Tsushima Island in 674, while gold was first recorded as being produced in Mutsu Province in 749.

During the 16th century, Japan rose to become one of the world's major producers of silver, particularly after the development of the Iwami Ginzan Silver Mine in present day Shimane Prefecture. In 1533, shortly after the mine's discovery, the introduction of new cupellation techniques from the Korean Peninsula enabled the large scale production of high-purity silver, and these methods subsequently spread to other Japanese mines. Japanese silver became an important commodity in international trade, particularly with China and Portuguese merchants. Iwami Ginzan alone is estimated to have supplied at least 10% of internationally traded silver during the late 16th century.

Mining expanded further during the Edo period (1603–1868). Around the turn of the 17th century, Japanese metalworker Soga Riemon developed nanban-buki, a refining technique based on European liquation methods. This process introduced lead to extract silver from crude copper, increasing the recovery of precious metals while also yielding purer copper. In 1601, Tokugawa Ieyasu took control of Sado Island, where the Aikawa gold and silver mines became a crucial source of revenue for the Tokugawa shogunate, with output peaking during the following decades. Copper mining also expanded during the 17th century, with the opening of new mines such as the Besshi copper mine in 1691. During this period, Japan was a significant exporter of copper, supplying markets in East Asia via Chinese and Dutch trading networks.

During the Meiji period, mine development was promoted under the policy of the Fengoku Robe by developing coal mining, the Ashio Copper Mine (足尾銅山), and the Kamaishi Mine (釜石鉱山) with iron ore in Hokkaido and northern Kyushu. The production of high-value gold and silver, even in small quantities, was at the top of the world. The Ashio Copper Mine had existed since at least the 1600s, then owned by the Tokugawa shogunate. At that time, it produced about 1,500 tons annually. The mine was closed in 1800. In 1871 it became privately owned and reopened when Japan industrialized following the Meiji Restoration. By 1885, it produced 4,090 tons of copper (39% of Japan's copper production). Due to a lack of regulations it caused substantial pollution. In 1911, the government passed the Factory Law which was Japan's first law to address industrial pollution. It was closed again in 1973.

Until the 1960s, during a period of high economic growth, active mining continued at mines in various regions. However, large-scale mining was difficult, with mixed quality, and costs were high. So foreign resources with low cost and good quality were imported. This resulted in closures of mines in Japan.

Until the 1970s, Japan had a large amount of mines. Oil, natural gas (although a small amount) and coal mining, along with gold, silver, copper, iron, and zinc mining was done on a large scale. After the period of high economic growth, in addition to resource depletion or decreasing quality of gathered material, the mining cost rose and price competitiveness was lost. As a result, many mines stopped operations.

The Japanese mining industry began to decline rapidly in the 1980s. Coal production shrank from a peak of 55 million tons in 1960 to slightly more than 16 million tons in 1985, while coal imports grew to nearly 91 million tons in 1987. Domestic coal mining companies faced cheap coal imports and high production costs, which caused them chronic deficits in the 1980s. In the late 1980s, Japan's approximately 1 million tons of coal reserves were mostly hard coal used for coking. Most of the coal Japan consumed is used to produce electric power.

In the 21st century, mining has only been carried out in the Kushiro Coal Field (釧路炭田) for technology transfer. Other mines have lost their price competitiveness due to resource depletion, degrading quality, and increased mining costs including labor costs. So many mines closed. Only a small number of mines are operational.

Since gold and silver is highly profitable even in small quantities, metal mining corporations continue to conduct systematic exploration and operations such as the discovery of the Hishikari mine. The Hishikari mine has an estimated reserves of 8 million oz of gold. In addition, sulfur, iodine, limestone and quartzite are still sufficiently mined in Japan.

According to the Canadian Trade Commission for Japan: "In 2012, the Government of Japan increased the credit line for the Japan Bank for International Cooperation (JBIC) by 10 trillion yen (approximately C$105 billion) to further enable the Japanese private sector to secure strategic natural resources, and expanded JBIC's mandate to provide financial assistance for certain types of natural resource development projects in developed countries. Although this initiative has ended in June 2016, JBIC will continue this initiative to support the Japanese FDI opportunities in natural resources sector."

The country lacks significant domestic reserves of fossil fuel, except coal. Thus Japan imports substantial amounts of crude oil, natural gas, and other energy resources, including uranium. Japan relied on oil imports to meet about 84 percent of its energy needs in 2010. Japan was the first coal importer in 2010, with 187 Mt (20% of total world coal import), and the first natural gas importer with 99 bcm (12.1% of world total gas import).

The seabed of Japan has major mineral resources. In April 2018, it was reported that mud from the seabed off the island Minami-Tori-shima, some 1,150 miles southeast of Tokyo, contains more than 16 million tons of rare-earth oxides. This was reported to be the equivalent to 780 years' worth of yttrium supply, 620 years of europium, 420 years of terbium and 730 years of dysprosium, at current rates of global usage.

== Japanese fuels production (1916–1945) ==
=== Coal deposits ===
In 1925, Japan's Mining Office referred to coal reserves in the empire of 8,000 million tonnes, or 2,933 million tonnes (Kyūshū, Miiki and Mitsui deposits), 2,675 or 3,471 million tonnes (Hokkaidō, ones 1,113,600 million from Yubari mine), 1,362 million tonnes (Karafuto, in Kawakami deposits), 614 million tonnes (Honshū), 385 million tonnes (Formosa, in the Kirun area), 81 million tonnes (Korea). Extraction in Japan during 1912 was 20,000,000 tonnes, in 1932 in 30,000,000 tonnes and grew in 1941 to 55,500,000 tonnes and was divided between the following sources, in tonnes: Korea (5,000,000), Formosa (2,500,000) and Karafuto (2,500,000) and additional imports 4,000,000 tonnes from China and Indochina.

Japanese coal is found in the extreme ends of the country, in Hokkaidō and Kyūshū, which have, respectively, 45 and 40 percent of the country's coal deposits. Kyūshū's coal is generally of poor quality and hard to extract, but the proximity of the Kyūshū mines to ports facilitates transportation. In Hokkaido, the seams are wider, can be worked mechanically, and offer a higher-quality coal. Unfortunately, these mines are located well inland, making transportation difficult. In most Japanese coal mines, inclined galleries, which extended in some places to 9.7^{1} kilometers underground, were used instead of pits. This arrangement is costly, despite the installation of moving platforms. The result is that a miner's daily output is far less than in Western Europe and the United States, thus domestic coal costs far more than imported coal.

As the coal mining industry declined, so did the general importance of domestic mining to the whole economy. Only 0.2% of the labour force was engaged in mining operations in 1988 and the value added from mining was about 0.3% of the total for all mining and manufacturing. Domestic mining production supplies an important quantity of some nonmetals: silica sand, pyrophyllite clay, dolomite, and limestone. Domestic mines are contributing declining shares of the country's requirements for some metals: zinc, copper, and gold. Almost all of the ores used in the nation's sophisticated processing industries are imported.

=== Oil sources ===
In 1925, the local petroleum reserves were estimated at 2,956,000 barrels in the Niigata, Akita and Nutsu deposits and, additionally, at Sakhalin concessions. In 1941, Japanese petroleum production was 2,659,000 barrels — about the daily production in the U.S., and 0.1% of world petroleum production. In Manchukuo, oil wells gave Japan 1,000,000 of additional petroleum tonnes per year. The local oils fields of Akita, Niigata and Nutsu produced 2,659,000 barrels. Additionally, they obtained oil in Formosa (1,000,000), Soviet Sakhalin (1,000,000) and the Manchu oil distillery process.

Oil wells have been drilled off the west coast of Honshū and Japan has oil concessions in North Sakhalin. Iron is scarce outside of Hokkaidō and northwest Honshū, and iron pyrite has been discovered in Honshū, Shikoku and Karafuto. A modest quantity of copper and gold is mined around Honshū, Hokkaidō and Karafuto.

As of 2016, remaining active oil fields are:

- Gojonome field in Gojōme, Akita.
- Several oil and gas fields in Niigata prefecture, including Nanatani in Kamo, Niigata and Uonuma field in Uonuma, Niigata.
- Motojuku field in Shōwa, Gunma.

=== Natural gas ===
Significant natural gas reserves remain in:

- Mobara gas field in Chiba Prefecture.
- Sado island gas field (suspected offshore oil field have failed to materialize)

== Metal production locations ==
Production of copper in 1917 was 108,000 tonnes, in 1921 54,000 tonnes, in 1926 63,400 tonnes but this production was augmented to 70,000 tonnes in 1931–1937. Gold production in Korea was 6.2 ton in 1930 rising to 26.1 ton/year at peak. In rivers and mines, other deposits were in Saganoseki (Ōita) Honshū, Kyushu, and North Formosa. Also, Japan imported gold from overseas.

Other important iron sources were Muroran (Hokkaidō) and Kenji (Korea). Total reserves were 90 M tonnes of their own, 10 M or 50 M in Korea (Kenjiho) and Formosa. Japan imported iron from Tayeh (China), 500,000 tonnes in 1940, from Malacca, Johore and other points, 1,874,000 tonnes, from Philippines 1,236,000 tonnes, India sent 1,000,000 tonnes and 3,000,000 processed iron in bars and Australia sent a similar quantity. The principal silver mines were in Kosaki, Kawaga and Hitachi, and others in Karafuto with Iron Pyrite.

The production of gold was curbed in 1943 by Order for Gold Mine Consolidation to concentrate on the minerals more critical for the munitions production.

== Metal sources ==
Cobalt, copper, gold, iron, lead, manganese, silver, tin, tungsten and zinc are common and were extensively mined in Japan.

Barium, beryllium, bismuth, cadmium, chromium, indium, lithium, mercury, molybdenum, nickel, titanium, uranium and vanadium are uncommon but still were mined in Japan.

== Non-metal elemental sources ==
Antimony, arsenic, boron, germanium, graphite and sulphur were all mined in Japan.

== Complex mineral sources ==
Japan has a history of mining deposits of:

- Hard stone – granite, granodiorite, diorite, feldspar, quartz (silica stone), sand (including silica sand), petuntse (pottery stone), dunite.
- Carbonates – dolomite, limestone.
- Clays – kaolinite, sericite, bentonite, fuller's earth.
- Soft and heat insulating stone – pyrophyllite, talc, asbestos, diatomaceous earth, perlite.
- Rare Earth Elements – yttrium, europium, terbium, dysprosium.
- Other – emery, calcite, gypsum, fluorite, zeolite, phosphorite.

== Deep sea mining ==
Japan has the 8th largest Exclusive Economic Zone of 4,470,000 km^{2} (1,730,000 mi^{2}). There are estimated large quantities of mineral resources such as methane clathrate, natural gas, metallic minerals and rare-earth mineral reserves stored in Japan's EEZ. Seabed mineral resources such as manganese nodules, cobalt-rich crust and submarine hydrothermal deposits are located at depths over 1,000 m (3,300 ft). Most of these deep sea resources are unexplored at the seabed. Much of the seabed has a depth of 3,000 m (9,800 ft) to 6,000 m (20,000 ft). Japan's mining law restricts offshore oil and gas production. There are technological hurdles to mine at such extreme depths and to limit the ecological impact. There are no successful commercial ventures that mine the deep sea yet. So currently there are few deep sea mining projects to retrieve minerals or deepwater drilling on the ocean floor.

It is estimated that there are approximately 40 trillion cubic feet of methane clathrate in the eastern Nankai Trough of Japan. As of 2019, the Methane clathrate in the deep sea remains unexploited, because the necessary technology is not established yet. This is why currently Japan has very limited proven reserves like crude oil.

The Kantō region alone is estimated to have over 400 billion cubic meters of natural gas reserves. It forms a Minami Kantō gas field in the area spanning Saitama, Tokyo, Kanagawa, Ibaraki, and Chiba prefectures. However, mining is strictly regulated in many areas because it is directly below Tokyo, and is only slightly mined in the Bōsō Peninsula. In Tokyo and Chiba Prefecture, there have been frequent accidents with natural gas that was released naturally from the Minami Kantō gas field.

In March 2013, the Japan Oil, Gas and Metals National Corporation (JOGMEC) became the first to successfully extract methane hydrate from seabed deposits.

In 2018, 250 km (160 mi) south of Minami-Tori-shima at 5,700 m (18,700 ft) deep, approximately 16 million tons of rare-earth minerals were discovered by JAMSTEC in collaboration with Waseda University and the University of Tokyo.

In 2021, the Government of Japan decided to limit access to offshore rare earth deposits within the EEZ to only approved miners with a license of the Ministry of Economy, Trade and Industry. Japanese law will be updated to include regulations for domestic rare earth mining. JOGMEC will be permitted to invest up to 75% in mining projects and mineral-refining operations.

== See also ==
- Japan Oil, Gas and Metals National Corporation
- Japan Coal Miners' Union
- List of mines in Japan
- Geography of Japan
- Geology of Japan
