= Poultry feed =

Food for chickens

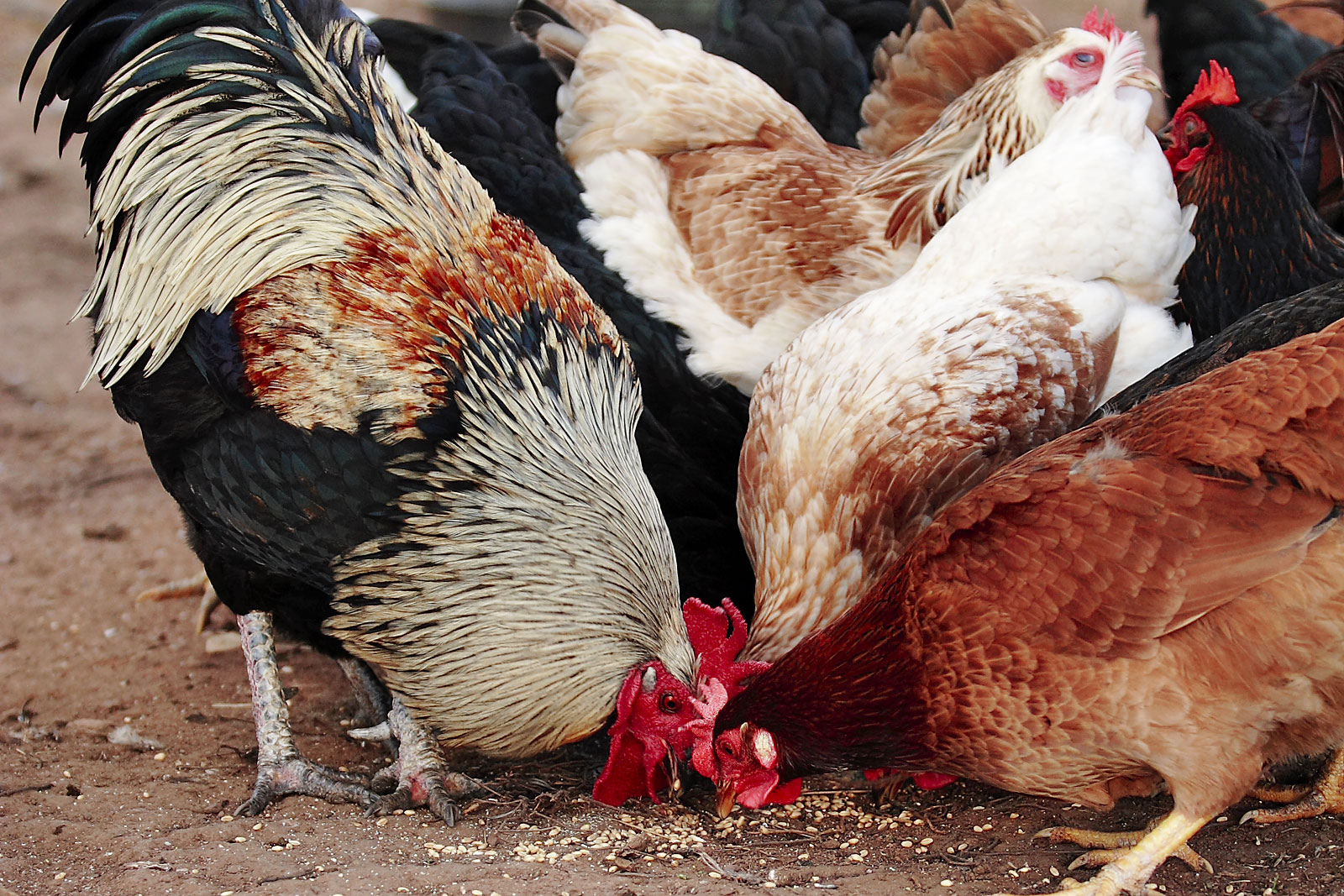
Chickens feeding on grain

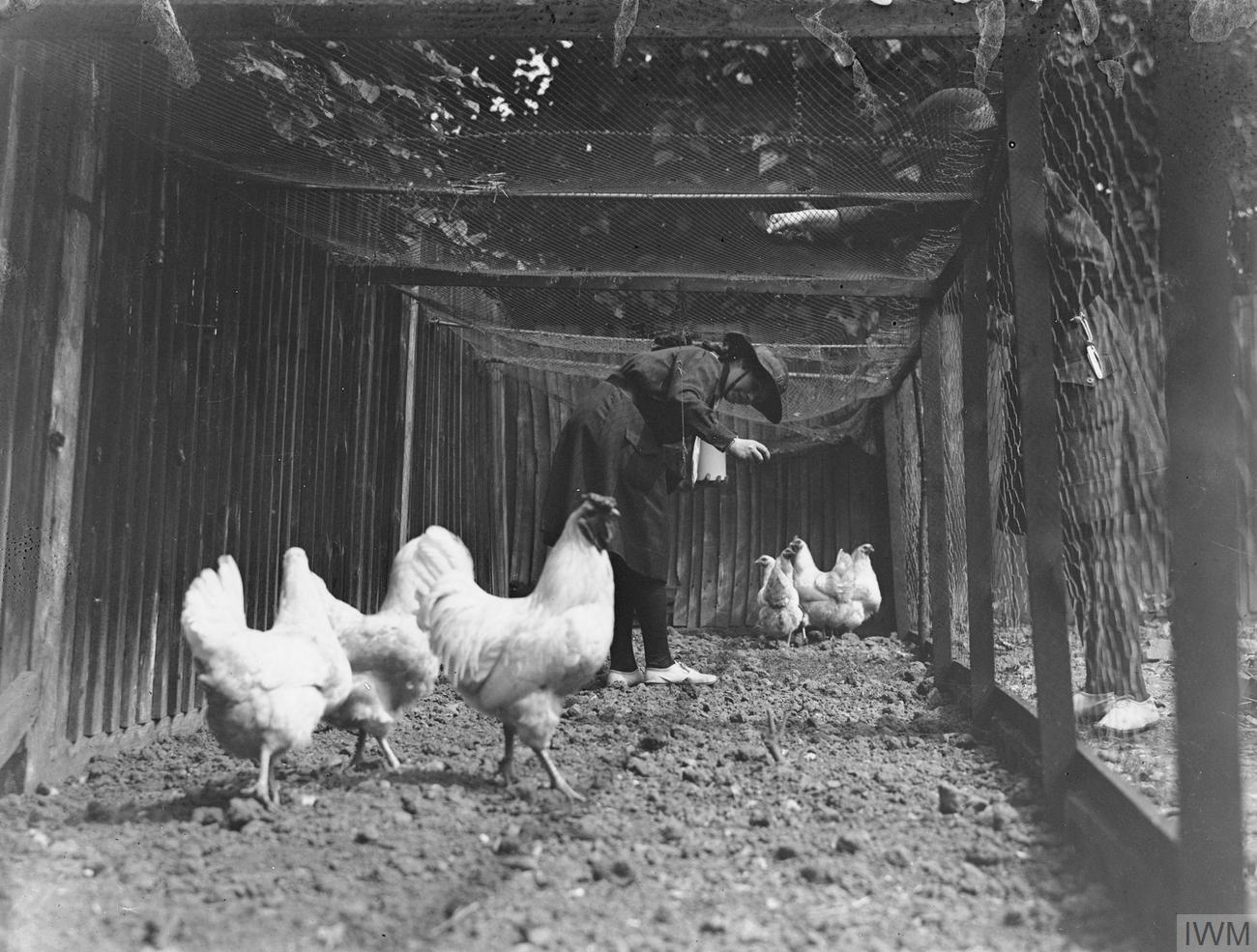
A Girl Guide in the United Kingdom feeding chickens during World War I

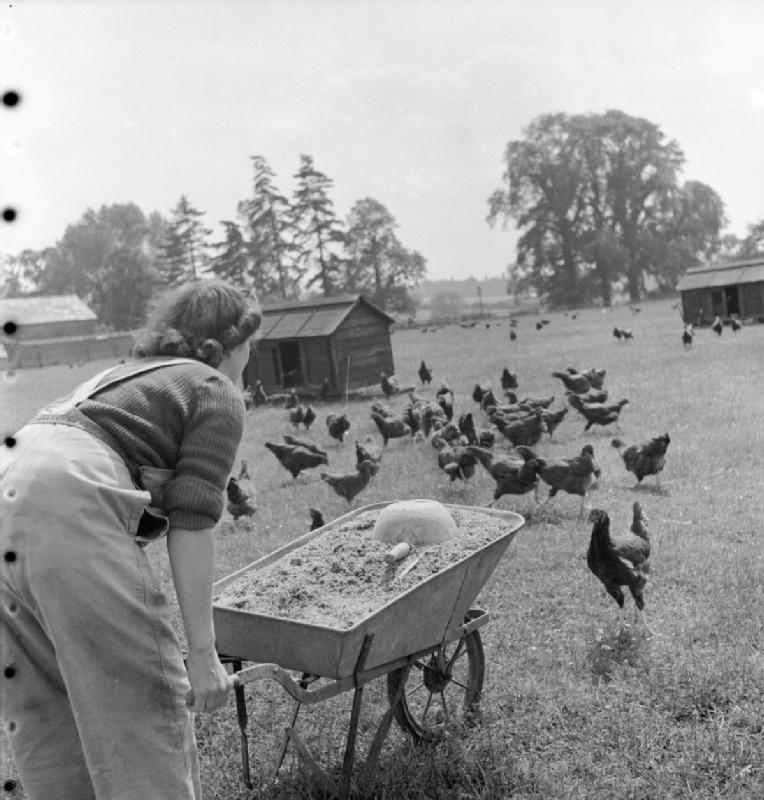
An agricultural worker pushing a wheelbarrow of chicken feed towards the chicken coops.

Poultry feed, also known as chicken feed, is food for farm poultry, including chickens, ducks, geese and other domestic birds.

Before the twentieth century, poultry were mostly kept on general farms, and foraged for much of their feed, eating insects, grain spilled by cattle and horses, and plants around the farm. This was often supplemented by grain, household scraps, calcium supplements such as oyster shell, and garden waste.

As farming became more specialized, many farms kept flocks too large to be fed in this way, and nutritionally complete poultry feed was developed. Modern feeds for poultry consists largely of grain, protein supplements such as soybean oil meal, mineral supplements, and vitamin supplements. The quantity of feed, and the nutritional requirements of the feed, depend on the weight and age of the poultry, their rate of growth, their rate of egg production, the weather (cold or wet weather causes higher energy expenditure), and the amount of nutrition the poultry obtain from foraging. This results in a wide variety of feed formulations. The substitution of less expensive local ingredients introduces additional variations.

Healthy poultry require a sufficient amount of protein and carbohydrates, along with the necessary vitamins, dietary minerals, and an adequate supply of water. Lactose-fermentation of feed can aid in supplying vitamins and minerals to poultry. Egg laying hens require 4 grams per day of calcium of which 2 grams are used in the egg. Oyster shells are often used as a source of dietary calcium. Certain diets also require the use of grit, tiny rocks such as pieces of granite, in the feed. Grit aids in digestion by grinding food as it passes through the gizzard. Grit is not needed if commercial feed is used. Calcium iodate is used as supplement of iodine.

The feed must remain clean and dry; contaminated feed can infect poultry. Damp feed encourages fungal growth. Mycotoxin poisoning, as an example, is "one of the most common and certainly most under-reported causes of toxicoses in poultry". Diseases can be avoided with proper maintenance of the feed and feeder. A feeder is the device that supplies the feed to the poultry. For privately raised chickens, or chickens as pets, feed can be delivered through jar, trough or tube feeders. The use of poultry feed can also be supplemented with food found through foraging. In industrial agriculture, machinery is used to automate the feeding process, reducing the cost and increasing the scale of farming. For commercial poultry farming, feed serves as the largest cost of the operation.

== Poultry feed terms ==
- Mash refers to a nutritionally complete poultry in a ground form. This is the earliest complete poultry ration.
- Pellets consist of a mash that has been pelletized; that is, compressed and molded into pellets in a pellet mill. Unlike mash, where the ingredients can separate in shipment and the poultry can pick and choose among the ingredients (many times picking out just the corn and leaving the rest), the ingredients in a single pellet stay together, and the poultry eat the pellets whole. Pellets are often too large for newly hatched poultry.
- Crumbles are pellets that have been sent through rollers to break them into granules. This is often used for chick feed.
- Scratch grain (or scratch feed) consists of one or more varieties of whole, cracked, or rolled grains. Unlike other feeds, which are fed in troughs, hoppers, or tube feeders, scratch grains are often scattered on the ground. Hence, a large particle size is desired. Because they consist only of grains, scratch grains are not a complete ration, and are used to supplement the balanced ration.

== See also ==
- Cattle feeding
- Insects as feed
