= Julius von Mayer =

German physician, chemist, knight, and physicist (1814–1878)

Julius Robert von Mayer
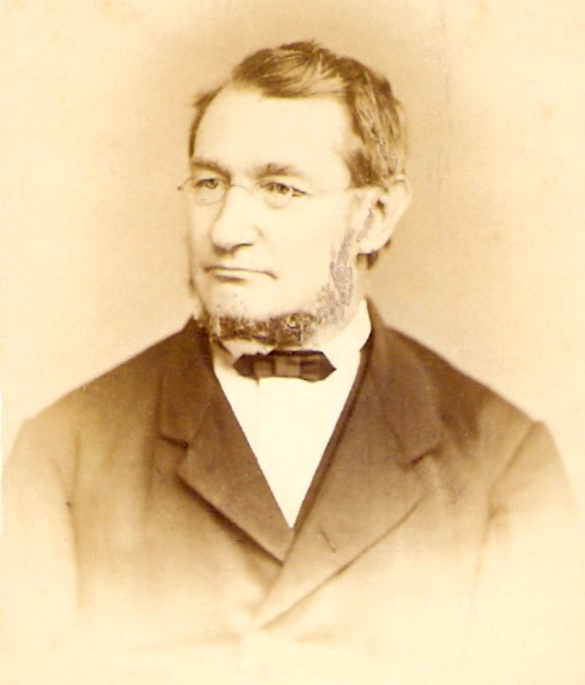
- Mayer in 1868
- Born: Julius Robert Mayer (Note: Ennobled in 1867.); 25 November 1814; Heilbronn, Kingdom of Württemberg
- Died: 20 March 1878 (aged 63); Heilbronn, Kingdom of Württemberg, German Empire
- Education: University of Tübingen
- Known for: First law of thermodynamics Mechanical equivalent of heat Mayer's reagent Mayer's relation
- Awards: Copley Medal (1871); Poncelet Prize (1869)
- Scientific career
- Fields: Physics

Julius Robert von Mayer (25 November 1814 – 20 March 1878) was a German physician, chemist, and physicist and one of the founders of thermodynamics. He is best known for enunciating in 1841 one of the original statements of the conservation of energy or what is now known as one of the first versions of the first law of thermodynamics, namely that "energy can be neither created nor destroyed". In 1842, Mayer described the vital chemical process now referred to as oxidation as the primary source of energy for any living creature. He also proposed that plants convert light into chemical energy.

His achievements were overlooked and priority for the discovery in 1842 of the mechanical equivalent of heat was attributed to James Joule in the following year.

== Early life ==
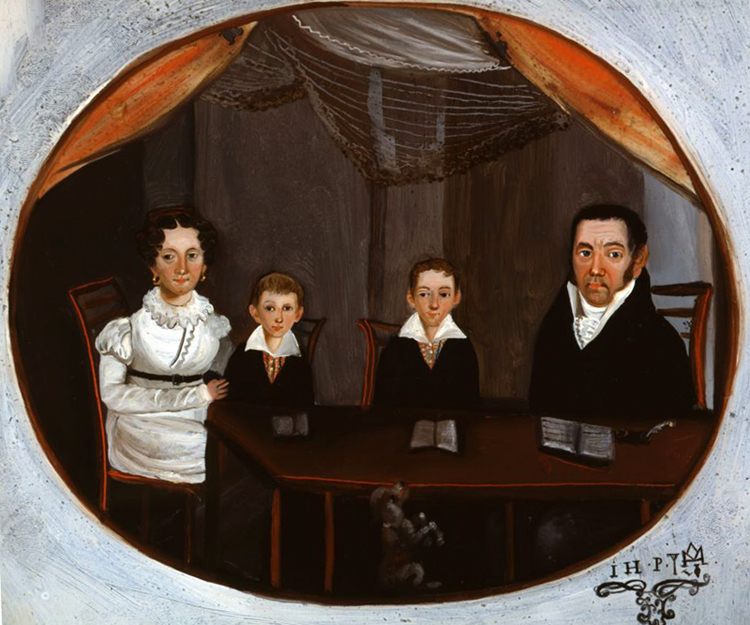
Pharmacist family Mayer from Heilbronn ca. 1820/25, the parents and two of the three sons are shown: probably Carl Gustav and Julius Robert.

Mayer was born on 25 November 1814 in Heilbronn, Württemberg (Baden-Württemberg, modern day Germany), the son of a pharmacist. He grew up in Heilbronn. After completing his Abitur, he studied medicine at the University of Tübingen, where he was a member of the Corps Guestphalia, a German Student Corps. During 1838 he attained his doctorate as well as passing the Staatsexamen. After a stay in Paris (1839/40) he left as a ship's physician on a Dutch three-mast sailing ship for a journey to Jakarta.

Although he had hardly been interested before this journey in physical phenomena, his observation that storm-whipped waves are warmer than the calm sea started him thinking about the physical laws, in particular about the physical phenomenon of warmth and the question whether the directly developed heat alone (the heat of combustion), or the sum of the quantities of heat developed in direct and indirect ways are to be accounted for in the burning process. After his return in February 1841 Mayer dedicated his efforts to solve this problem.

In 1841 he settled in Heilbronn and married.

== Development of ideas ==
Even as a young child, Mayer showed an intense interest with various mechanical mechanisms. He was a young man who performed various experiments of the physical and chemical variety. In fact, one of his favorite hobbies was creating various types of electrical devices and air pumps. It was obvious that he was intelligent. Hence, Mayer attended Eberhard-Karls University in May 1832. He studied medicine during his time there.

In 1837, he and some of his friends were arrested for wearing the couleurs of a forbidden organization. The consequences for this arrest included a one year expulsion from the college and a brief period of incarceration. This diversion sent Mayer traveling to Switzerland, France, and the Dutch East Indies. Mayer drew some additional interest in mathematics and engineering from his friend Carl Baur through private tutoring. In 1841, Mayer returned to Heilbronn to practice medicine, but physics became his new passion.

In June 1841 he completed his first scientific paper entitled "On the Quantitative and Qualitative Determination of Forces". It was largely ignored by other professionals in the area. Then, Mayer became interested in the area of heat and its motion. He presented a value in numerical terms for the mechanical equivalent of heat. He also was the first person to describe the vital chemical process now referred to as oxidation as the primary source of energy for any living creature.

In 1848 he calculated that in the absence of a source of energy the Sun would cool down in only 5000 years, and he suggested that the impact of meteorites kept it hot.

Since he was not taken seriously at the time, his achievements were overlooked and credit was given to James Joule. Mayer almost committed suicide after he discovered this fact. He spent some time in mental institutions to recover from this and the loss of some of his children. Several of his papers were published due to the advanced nature of the physics and chemistry. He was awarded an honorary doctorate in 1859 by the philosophical faculty at the University of Tübingen. His overlooked work was revived in 1862 by fellow physicist John Tyndall in a lecture at the London Royal Institution. In July 1867 Mayer published "Die Mechanik der Wärme." This publication dealt with the mechanics of heat and its motion. On 5 November 1867 Mayer was awarded personal nobility by the Kingdom of Württemberg (von Mayer) which is the German equivalent of a British knighthood. von Mayer died in Germany in 1878.

After Sadi Carnot stated it for caloric, Mayer was the first person to state the law of the conservation of energy, one of the most fundamental tenets of modern day physics. The law of the conservation of energy states that the total mechanical energy of a system remains constant in any isolated system of objects that interact with each other only by way of forces that are conservative. Mayer's first attempt at stating the conservation of energy was a paper he sent to Johann Christian Poggendorff's Annalen der Physik, in which he postulated a conservation of force (Erhaltungssatz der Kraft). However, owing to Mayer's lack of advanced training in physics, it contained some fundamental mistakes and was not published. Mayer continued to pursue the idea steadfastly and argued with the Tübingen physics professor Johann Gottlieb Nörremberg, who rejected his hypothesis. Nörremberg did, however, give Mayer a number of valuable suggestions on how the idea could be examined experimentally; for example, if kinetic energy transforms into heat energy, water should be warmed by vibration.

Mayer not only performed this demonstration, but determined also the quantitative factor of the transformation, calculating the mechanical equivalent of heat. The result of his investigations was published 1842 in the May edition of Justus von Liebig's Annalen der Chemie und Pharmacie. It was translated as Remarks on the Forces of Inorganic Nature In his booklet Die organische Bewegung im Zusammenhang mit dem Stoffwechsel (The Organic Movement in Connection with the Metabolism, 1845) he specified the numerical value of the mechanical equivalent of heat: at first as 365 kgf·m/kcal, later as 425 kgf·m/kcal; the modern values are 4.184 kJ/kcal (426.6 kgf·m/kcal) for the thermochemical calorie and 4.1868 kJ/kcal (426.9 kgf·m/kcal) for the international steam table calorie.

This relation implies that, although work and heat are different forms of energy, they can be transformed into one another. This law is now called the first law of thermodynamics, and led to the formulation of the general principle of conservation of energy, definitively stated by Hermann von Helmholtz in 1847.

=== Mayer's relation ===
Mayer derived a relation between specific heat at constant pressure and the specific heat at constant volume for an ideal gas. The relation is:

$C_{P,m} - C_{V,m} = R$,

where C_{P,m} is the molar specific heat at constant pressure, C_{V,m} is the molar specific heat at constant volume and R is the gas constant.

== Later life ==
Mayer was aware of the importance of his discovery, but his inability to express himself scientifically led to degrading speculation and resistance from the scientific establishment. Contemporary physicists rejected his principle of conservation of energy, and even acclaimed physicists Hermann von Helmholtz and James Prescott Joule viewed his ideas with hostility. The former doubted Mayer's qualifications in physical questions, and a bitter dispute over priority developed with the latter.

In 1848 two of his children died rapidly in succession, and Mayer's mental health deteriorated. He attempted suicide on 18 May 1850 and was committed to a mental institution. After he was released, he was a broken man and only timidly re-entered public life in 1860. However, in the meantime, his scientific fame had grown and he received a late appreciation of his achievement, although perhaps at a stage where he was no longer able to enjoy it.

He continued to work vigorously as a physician until his death.

== Honors ==
- 1840 Mayer received the Knight Cross of the Order of the Crown (Württemberg).
- 1869 Mayer received the prix Poncelet.
- The Robert-Mayer-Gymnasium and the Robert-Mayer-Volks- und Schulsternwarte in Heilbronn bear his name.

In chemistry, he invented Mayer's reagent which is used in detecting alkaloids.

== Works ==
- Ueber das Santonin : eine Inaugural-Dissertation, welche zur Erlangung der Doctorwürde in der Medicin & Chirurgie unter dem Praesidium von Wilhelm Rapp im July 1838 der öffentlichen Prüfung vorlegt Julius Robert Mayer . M. Müller, Heilbronn 1838 Digital edition by the University and State Library Düsseldorf
