= Bernard Courtois =

19th-century French chemist

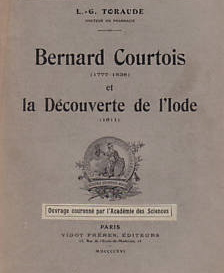
- Born: 8 February 1777; Dijon, France
- Died: 27 September 1838 (aged 61); Paris, France
- Occupation: chemist
- Known for: Discovery of: Iodine
- Spouse: Madeleine Morand
- Parents: Jean-Baptiste Courtois; Marie Blé Fairbanks

Bernard Courtois (French pronunciation: [bɛʁnaʁ kuʁtwa]), also spelled Barnard Courtois, (8 February 1777 – 27 September 1838) was a French chemist credited with first isolating iodine, making early photography possible.

By 1811 the Napoleonic Wars had made the government-controlled saltpeter business taper off since there was by then a shortage of wood ashes with which potassium nitrate was made. As an alternative, the needed potassium nitrate was derived from seaweed that was abundant on the Normandy and Brittany shores. The seaweed also had another, yet undiscovered, important chemical. One day towards the end of 1811 while Courtois was isolating sodium and potassium compounds from seaweed ash, he discovered iodine after he added sulfuric acid to the seaweed ash. He was investigating corrosion of his copper vessels when he noticed a vapor given off. It was in the form of an unusual purple vapor. Humphry Davy later records:

"This substance was accidentally discovered about two years ago by M. Courtois, a manufacturer of saltpetre at Paris. In his processes for procuring soda from the ashes of sea weeds, (cendres de vareck) he found the metallic vessels much corroded; and in searching for the cause of this effect, he made the discovery. The substance is procured from the ashes, after the extraction of the carbonate of soda, with great facility, and merely by the action of sulfuric acid:— when the acid is concentrated, so as to produce much heat, the substance appears as a vapour of a beautiful violet colour, which condenses in crystals having the colour and the lustre of plumbago."

== Later life ==
Courtois was acknowledged by Humphry Davy and Joseph Louis Gay-Lussac as the true discoverer of iodine. In 1822, he began manufacturing high-quality iodine and its salts. In 1831, he was awarded 6,000 francs as part of the Montyon Prize by L'Academie royale des sciences, for the medicinal value of the element. He struggled financially for the rest of his life and died 27 September 1838. He was 61 years old and had no assets to leave to his widow or son. In the year of his death, under the heading Obituary, the Journal de chimie médicale drily noted his passing with:

"Bernard Courtois, the discoverer of iodine, died at Paris the 27th of September, 1838, leaving his widow without fortune. If, on making this discovery, Courtois had taken out a certificate of invention, he would have realized a large estate."
