= Calcium iodate =

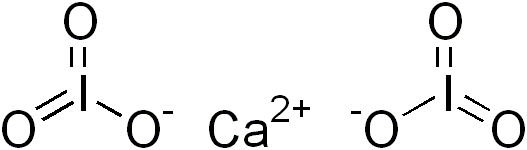

Names
- IUPAC name Calcium diiodate
- Other names Lautarite

Identifiers
CAS Number	7789-80-2 (anhydrous); 10031-33-1 (hexahydrate)
3D model (JSmol)	Interactive image
ChemSpider	23021
ECHA InfoCard	100.029.265
EC Number	232-191-3
E number	E916 (glazing agents, ...)
PubChem CID	24619
UNII	L8MN4Y57BR (anhydrous)
CompTox Dashboard (EPA)	DTXSID40960972
- InChI: InChI=1S/Ca.2HIO3/c;2*2-1(3)4/h;2*(H,2,3,4)/q+2;;/p-2 Key: UHWJJLGTKIWIJO-UHFFFAOYSA-L; InChI=1/Ca.2HIO3/c;2*2-1(3)4/h;2*(H,2,3,4)/q+2;;/p-2 Key: UHWJJLGTKIWIJO-NUQVWONBAT
- SMILES: [Ca+2].[O-]I(=O)=O.[O-]I(=O)=O

Properties
Chemical formula	Ca(IO_{3})_{2}
Molar mass	389.88 g/mol (anhydrous); 407.90 g/mol (monohydrate)
Appearance	white solid
Density	4.519 g/cm^{3} (monohydrate)
Melting point	540 °C (1,004 °F; 813 K) (monohydrate)
Boiling point	decomposes
Solubility in water	0.09 g/100 mL (0 °C); 0.24 g/100 mL (20 °C); 0.67 g/100 mL (90 °C)
Solubility product (K_{sp})	6.47×10^{−6}
Solubility	soluble in nitric acid insoluble in alcohol
Magnetic susceptibility (χ)	−101.4·10^{−6} cm^{3}/mol

Structure
Crystal structure	monoclinic (anhydrous) cubic (monohydrate) orthorhombic (hexahydrate)

Hazards
Flash point	non-flammable
- Except where otherwise noted, data are given for materials in their standard state (at 25 °C [77 °F], 100 kPa). verify (what is ?) Infobox references

Calcium iodate is any of two inorganic compounds with the formula Ca(IO_{3})_{2}(H_{2}O)_{x}, where x = 0 or 1. Both are colourless salts that occur as the minerals lautarite and bruggenite, respectively. A third mineral form of calcium iodate is dietzeite, a salt containing chromate with the formula Ca_{2}(IO_{3})_{2}CrO_{4}. These minerals are the most common compounds containing iodate.

== Production and uses ==
Lautarite, described as the most important mineral source of iodine, is mined in the Atacama Desert. Processing of the ore entails reduction of its aqueous extracts with sodium bisulfite to give sodium iodide. This comproportionation reaction is a major source of the sodium iodide.

Calcium iodate can be produced by the anodic oxidation of calcium iodide or by passing chlorine into a hot solution of lime in which iodine has been dissolved.

Calcium iodate is used as an iodine supplement in chicken feed. Ethylenediamine dihydroiodide (EDDI) is a more typical source of nutritional iodine.
