= Ethylenediamine dihydroiodide =

Names
- IUPAC name Ethane-1,2-diamine dihydroiodide
- Other names Ethylenediammonium diiodide Ethane-1,2-diammonium iodide Jodethamine; Hydrodine

Identifiers
| CAS Number | 5700-49-2 |
| 3D model (JSmol) | Interactive image; Interactive image |
| Abbreviations | EDDI |
| ChemSpider | 20604 |
| ECHA InfoCard | 100.024.715 |
| PubChem CID | 21921 |
| UNII | 721M52NQ5L |
| CompTox Dashboard (EPA) | DTXSID5044570 |
- InChI: InChI=1S/C2H8N2.2HI/c3-1-2-4;;/h1-4H2;2*1H Key: IWNWLPUNKAYUAW-UHFFFAOYSA-N; InChI=1/C2H8N2.2HI/c3-1-2-4;;/h1-4H2;2*1H Key: IWNWLPUNKAYUAW-UHFFFAOYAJ
- SMILES: NCCN.I.I; I.I.NCCN

Properties
| Chemical formula | C_{2}H_{10}I_{2}N_{2} |
| Molar mass | 315.92 g/mol |
| Appearance | Colorless to light yellow crystalline powder |
- Except where otherwise noted, data are given for materials in their standard state (at 25 °C [77 °F], 100 kPa). verify (what is ?) Infobox references

Ethylenediamine dihydroiodide (EDDI) is a water-soluble salt derived from ethylenediamine and hydroiodic acid. It is a colorless to light yellow crystalline powder. The salt consists of the ethylenediammonium dication C_{2}H_{4}(NH_{3})_{2}^{2+} and iodide anions.

== Application ==
EDDI is used as an additive in pet food and cattle feed with high bioavailability. Used to prevent iodine deficiency, this salt is one of the major uses of the element iodine. The United States Food and Drug Administration suggests a limit of intake to 50 mg/head/day. Although EDDI is generally recognized as safe (GRAS) only as a nutrient source of iodine, administration of EDDI also has preventative effects on foot rot in cattle.

Other iodine supplements for animal feed include calcium iodate (most stable) and potassium iodide.

== See also ==
Calcium iodates are another source of nutritional iodide.
