= Minami Kantō gas field =

Large gas field in Chiba, Japan

The Minami Kantō gas field (南関東ガス田, Minami Kantō gasuden) is a large gas field in Japan, east of Tokyo, in the Chiba prefecture.

== Natural resources ==
=== Natural gas ===
The basin holds the most prolific natural gas reserves in Japan, with ultimate gas production of 375 billion cubic meters.

=== Brine ===
In addition to natural gas, the field yields a brine rich in iodine. The iodine is extracted in large scale and makes this area the second largest producer after Chile, where the iodine is extracted from the caliche.
