= Mayer's reagent =

Helps to detect alkaloids

Mayer's reagent is an alkaloidal precipitating reagent used for the detection of alkaloids in natural products. Mayer's reagent is freshly prepared by dissolving a mixture of mercuric chloride (1.36 g) and of potassium iodide (5.00 g) in water (100.0 ml). Most alkaloids are precipitated from neutral or slightly acidic solution by Mayer's reagent (potassiomercuric iodide solution) to give a cream coloured precipitate. This test was invented by and named after the German chemist Julius Robert Von Mayer (1814–1878). Can be used as a visualization reagent in thin-layer chromatography (TLC) for the detection of alkaloids.
