= List of cultural properties of Japan – writings (Okinawa) =

This list is of the cultural properties of Japan designated in the categories of calligraphic works and classical texts (書跡・典籍, shoseki tenseki) and ancient documents (古文書, komonjo) for the Prefecture of Okinawa.

== National Cultural Properties ==
=== Classical texts ===
As of 1 August 2020, two Important Cultural Properties have been designated, being of national significance.

| Property | Date | Municipality | Ownership | Comments | Image | Coordinates | Ref. |
|---|---|---|---|---|---|---|---|
| Omoro Sōshi おもろさうし（内四冊補写） Omoro sōshi | 1710 | Naha | Okinawa Prefecture (kept at the Okinawa Prefectural Museum and Art Museum) | 22 volumes; taken to America after the Battle of Okinawa and returned in 1953 | | 26°13′36″N 127°41′38″E | |
| Konkōkenshū 混効験集〈乾坤／〉 Konkō kenshū | 1711 | Naha | Okinawa Prefecture (kept at the Okinawa Prefectural Museum and Art Museum) | 2 volumes; dictionary of archaic court speech with definitions of approximately 1,100 words | | 26°13′36″N 127°41′38″E | |

=== Ancient documents ===
As of 1 August 2020, two Important Cultural Properties have been designated.

| Property | Date | Municipality | Ownership | Comments | Image | Coordinates | Ref. |
|---|---|---|---|---|---|---|---|
| Dana Family Documents 田名家文書（三十二通） Dana-ke monjo | 1523–1850 | Naha | private (kept at the Okinawa Prefectural Museum and Art Museum) | 3 scrolls with 32 documents | | 26°13′36″N 127°41′38″E | |
| Stone Stelai from the Period of the Ryūkyū Kingdom 琉球国時代石碑; Ryūkyū-koku jidai sekihi | First and second Shō dynasty | Naha | Okinawa Prefecture (kept at the Okinawa Prefectural Museum and Art Museum & Okinawa Prefectural Archaeological Center) | 25 stelai, including one dating to 1427 (pictured) | | 26°13′36″N 127°41′38″E | |

== Prefectural Cultural Properties ==
=== Calligraphic works ===
As of 1 May 2019, four properties have been designated at a prefectural level.

| Property | Date | Municipality | Ownership | Comments | Image | Coordinates | Ref. |
|---|---|---|---|---|---|---|---|
| Works by Tei Junsoku 程順則の書; Tei Junsoku no sho | early Edo period | Naha | Okinawa Prefecture (kept at the Okinawa Prefectural Museum and Art Museum) | one scroll | | 26°13′36″N 127°41′38″E | for all refs see |
| Works by Sai On 蔡温の書; Sai On no sho | early Edo period | Naha | private | two scrolls, one with the brushwork 言多語失皆因酒 and the other 義断情疎只為銭 | | 26°13′20″N 127°41′00″E | |
| Plaque Inscribed 徳高 by Tei Gen'i 扁額徳高 鄭元偉書 hengaku toku takashi Tei Gen'i sho | late Edo period | Naha | Okinawa Prefecture (kept at the Okinawa Prefectural Museum and Art Museum) | | | 26°13′36″N 127°41′38″E | |
| Plaque Inscribed 凌雲 by Rin Rinshō 扁額凌雲 林麟焻書 hengaku ryōun Rin Rinshō sho | C17 | Naha | Okinawa Prefecture (kept at the Okinawa Prefectural Museum and Art Museum) | | | 26°13′36″N 127°41′38″E | |

=== Classical texts ===
As of 1 May 2019, four properties have been designated at a prefectural level.

| Property | Date | Municipality | Ownership | Comments | Image | Coordinates | Ref. |
|---|---|---|---|---|---|---|---|
| Chūzan Seikan 評定所格護定本 中山世鑑 hyōjōsho kakugo teihon Chūzan Seikan | 1650 | Naha | Okinawa Prefecture (kept at the Okinawa Prefectural Museum and Art Museum) | six volumes; the Mirror of Chūzan, by Haneji Chōshū, was the first official history of the kingdom | | 26°13′36″N 127°41′38″E | for all refs see |
| Chūzan Seifu 評定所格護定本 中山世譜 hyōjōsho kakugo teihon Chūzan Seifu | 1701 | Naha | Okinawa Prefecture (kept at the Okinawa Prefectural Museum and Art Museum) | nineteen volumes; official history | | 26°13′36″N 127°41′38″E | |
| Kunkunshi by Yakabi Chōki 屋嘉比朝寄作 工工四; Yakabi Chōki-saku Kunkunshī | mid-C18 | Nishihara | Japan (kept at the University of the Ryukyus Library) | one volume of 43 pages with text on both sides; notation for the sanshin | | 26°14′53″N 127°46′00″E | |
| Urasoe Family Copy of Ise Monogatari 浦添家本伊勢物語; Urasoe-ke bon Ise Monogatari | | Nishihara | Japan (kept at the University of the Ryukyus Library) | | | 26°14′53″N 127°46′00″E | |

=== Ancient documents ===
As of 1 May 2019, seven properties have been designated at a prefectural level.

| Property | Date | Municipality | Ownership | Comments | Image | Coordinates | Ref. |
|---|---|---|---|---|---|---|---|
| Warrant of Appointment to the Shuri Ōyako of Shimoji, Miyakojima 宮古島下地の首里大屋子への辞令書; Miyakojima Shimoji no Shuri Ōyako e no jireisho | 1595 | Naha | Okinawa Prefecture (kept at the Okinawa Prefectural Museum and Art Museum) | | | 26°13′36″N 127°41′38″E | for all refs see |
| Katsuren Magiri Haebaru Village Documents 勝連間切南風原村文書; Katsuren magiri Haebaru-mura monjo | 1887–1897 | Uruma | Haebaru District (kept at the Uruma City Ishikawa Museum of History and Folklore (うるま市石川歴史民俗資料館)) | 68 booklets and 29 cadastral maps | | 26°25′19″N 127°49′31″E | |
| Nakamura Family Documents 中村家文書; Nakamura-ke monjo | 1604, 1607, 1612 | Motobu | private | 3 documents | | 26°39′19″N 127°53′40″E | |
| Warrant of Appointment to the Shuri Ōyako of Nakada, Iheya Island 伊平屋島仲田の首里大屋子への辞令書; Iheyajima Nakada no Shuri Ōyako e no jireisho | 1587 | Naha | Okinawa Prefecture (kept at the Okinawa Prefectural Museum and Art Museum) | | | 26°13′36″N 127°41′38″E | |
| Warrant of Appointment to the Yaga Noro, Haneji Magiri 羽地間切の屋我のろへの辞令書; Haneji Magiri no Yaga noro e no jireisho | 1625 | Naha | Okinawa Prefecture (kept at the Okinawa Prefectural Museum and Art Museum) | | | 26°13′36″N 127°41′38″E | |
| Oyazato Family Documents 親里家文書; Oyazato-ke monjo | 1631–1652 | Tarama | private | 4 documents | | 24°40′06″N 124°42′01″E | |
| Inscription with the History of the Sanhoku Nakijin Castle Kanshu Administrator 山北今帰仁城監守来歴碑記; Sanhoku Nakijin-jō kanshu raireki hiki | 1749 | Nakijin | Nakijin Board of Education (kept at the Nakijin Centre for History and Culture (今帰仁村歴史文化センター)) | inscribed both front and back (rubbing pictured) | | 26°41′30″N 127°55′38″E | |

== Municipal Cultural Properties ==
=== Calligraphic works ===
As of 1 May 2019, six properties have been designated at a municipal level.

| Property | Date | Municipality | Ownership | Comments | Image | Coordinates | Ref. |
|---|---|---|---|---|---|---|---|
| Works by Tei Junsoku 程順則書軸; Tei Junsoku shojiku | | Nago | Nago Museum | | | 26°35′10″N 127°59′13″E | for all refs see |
| Poems by Wang Wenzhi 王文治詩文; Ō Bunchi shibun | | Onna | Onna Village (kept at the Onna Village Museum (恩納村博物館)) | | | 26°26′10″N 127°47′36″E | |
| Poems by Xu Baoguang 徐葆光詩文; Jo Hokō shibun | | Onna | Onna Village (kept at the Onna Village Museum (恩納村博物館)) | | | 26°26′10″N 127°47′36″E | |
| Board inscribed 寿 掛床(寿) kakedoko (ju) | | Tarama | Tarama Village (kept at the Furusato Minzoku Gakushūkan (ふるさと民俗学習館) | | | 24°40′13″N 124°41′46″E) | |
| Board inscribed 福 掛床(福) kakedoko (fuku) | | Tarama | Tarama Village (kept at the Furusato Minzoku Gakushūkan (ふるさと民俗学習館) | | | 24°40′13″N 124°41′46″E) | |
| Plaque inscribed 龍光 扁額(龍光) hengaku (ryūkō) | | Tarama | private | | | 24°40′09″N 124°42′07″E | |

=== Classical texts ===
As of 1 May 2019, ten properties have been designated at a municipal level.

| Property | Date | Municipality | Ownership | Comments | Image | Coordinates | Ref. |
|---|---|---|---|---|---|---|---|
| Gokyōjō by Sai On 蔡温の御教条(1冊); Sai On no Gokyōjō | | Motobu | private | 1 volume | | 26°12′49″N 127°42′25″E | for all refs see |
| Motomura Family Inscription 本村家「報本」碑; Motomura-ke "hōhon" hi | | Miyakojima | private | | | 24°48′10″N 125°16′49″E | |
| Onga Satonushi Pēchin Tombstone 恩河里之子親雲上の墓碑; Onga Satonushi Pēchin no bohi | | Miyakojima | private | | | 24°48′37″N 125°16′51″E | |
| Industrial Benefaction Monument 産業界之恩人記念碑 sangyōkai no onjin kinenhi | | Miyakojima | Miyako Jinja (宮古神社) | | | 24°48′28″N 125°16′50″E | |
| Swords and Ancient Documents 刀剣及び古文書 tōken oyobi komonjo | | Miyakojima | private | also classified as ancient documents | | 24°49′11″N 125°10′27″E | |
| Yoseyama Regulations 与世山規模帳; Yoseyama kibochō | | Tarama | private | | | 24°40′15″N 124°42′13″E | |
| Register from the Year of the Ox 丑年惣頭帳 ushidoshi sōzuchō | | Tarama | private (kept at the Furusato Minzoku Gakushūkan (ふるさと民俗学習館)) | | | 24°40′13″N 124°41′46″E | |
| Register from the Year of the Rat 子年惣頭帳 nedoshi sōzuchō | | Tarama | private (kept at the Furusato Minzoku Gakushūkan (ふるさと民俗学習館)) | | | 24°40′13″N 124°41′46″E | |
| Taijōkan Nōhen 太上感応篇; Taijōkan Nōhen | | Tarama | private (kept at the Furusato Minzoku Gakushūkan (ふるさと民俗学習館)) | Daoist text | | 24°40′13″N 124°41′46″E | |
| Wage Records 俸給文書 hōkyū monjo | | Tarama | private (kept at the Furusato Minzoku Gakushūkan (ふるさと民俗学習館)) | | | 24°40′13″N 124°41′46″E | |

=== Ancient documents ===
As of 1 May 2019, fifty properties have been designated at a municipal level.

| Property | Date | Municipality | Ownership | Comments | Image | Coordinates | Ref. |
|---|---|---|---|---|---|---|---|
| Warrant of Appointment to Nakamaura Gensei and Related Materials 仲村源正宛辞令書及び関係資料; Nakamura Gensei ate jireisho oyobi kankei shiryō | | Nakijin | Nakijin Village (kept at the Nakijin Centre for History and Culture (今帰仁村歴史文化センター)) | | | 26°41′30″N 127°55′38″E | for all refs see |
| Warrants of Appointment to Aragusuku Tokujo and Aragusuku Tokukō and Related Materials 新城徳助・徳幸宛辞令書及び関係資料; Aragusuku Tokujo・Tokukō ate jireisho oyobi kankei shiryō | | Nakijin | Nakijin Village (kept at the Nakijin Centre for History and Culture (今帰仁村歴史文化センター)) | | | 26°41′30″N 127°55′38″E | |
| Warrant of Appointment to Shokita Fukuan and Related Materials 諸喜田福安宛辞令書及び関係資料; Shokita Fukuan ate jireisho oyobi kankei shiryō | | Nakijin | Nakijin Village (kept at the Nakijin Centre for History and Culture (今帰仁村歴史文化センター)) | | | 26°41′30″N 127°55′38″E | |
| Warrants of Appointment 旧慣による役職辞令書 kyūkan ni yoru yakushoku jireisho (9通) | | Motobu | private | 9 documents | | 26°12′49″N 127°42′25″E | |
| Documents of Nakanoya, Gabusoka 我部祖河仲ノ屋文書; Gabusoka Nakanoya monjo | | Nago | private | | | 26°37′19″N 128°00′05″E | |
| Genealogy of the Kyoda Family and related Ancient Documents 許田家所蔵の家譜及び関連古文書類; Kyoda-ke shozō no kafu oyobi kanren komonjo-rui | | Ginoza | private | | | 26°29′17″N 127°59′01″E | |
| Nishihara Nakayama Family Documents 西原中山家文書; Nishihara Nakayama-ke monjo | | Nishihara | private | | | 26°13′40″N 127°46′04″E | |
| Document from Nishihara Magiri Tanabara Village to Ida Pechin 西原間切棚原村から伊田親雲上宛の板証書; Nishihara magiri Tanabara-mura kara Ida pēchin ate no ita shōsho | 1869 | Nishihara | private | board with 470 characters of sorobun (候文) in recognition of assistance after a number of disasters; 135 centimetres (53 in) by 40 centimetres (16 in) by 1.2 centimetres (0.47 in) | | 26°14′26″N 127°45′11″E | |
| Mashiki Sakima Family Documents 真志喜佐喜真家文書; Mashiki Sakima-ke monjo | | Ginowan | private | | | 26°16′15″N 127°44′23″E | |
| Shinshū Mie Bridge Inscription 新修美栄橋碑; Shinshū Miebashi hi | | Naha | Naha City | | | 26°13′09″N 127°41′03″E | |
| Cadastral Map of Takamiyagusuku Village 高宮城村地籍図; Takamiyagusuku-son chiseki-zu | | Naha | Naha City (kept at Naha City Museum of History) | | | 26°12′49″N 127°40′44″E | |
| Tomigusuku Magiri Kakazu Former Ōta Pechin Memorandum 豊見城間切嘉数前大田親雲上勤書「口上覚」 Tomigusuku magiri Kakazu saki no Ōta pēchin tsutomegaki "kōjō oboe" | | Tomigusuku | Tomigusuku City | | | 26°11′22″N 127°41′54″E | |
| Aza Yone Ōgusuku Family Documents 字与根大城家文書; Aza Yone Ōgusuku-ke monjo | | Tomigusuku | Tomigusuku City | | | 26°10′26″N 127°40′27″E | |
| Kakinohana Shitakarī Family Ancient Documents 垣花勢高殿家古文書; Kakinohana Shitakarī-ke komonjo | | Nanjō | Nanjō City | | | 26°10′34″N 127°44′40″E | |
| Yōhekisan 葉壁山; Yōhekisan | | Izena | Izena Village (kept at the Izena Fureai Folk Museum (伊是名村ふれあい民俗館) | | | 26°55′21″N 127°56′28″E | |
| Takewa 竹割; Takewa | | Izena | private | | | 26°55′33″N 127°56′55″E | |
| Copy of Forestry Ordinance 植林に対する言上写 shokurin ni taisuru gonjō utsushi | | Izena | private | | | 26°55′56″N 127°56′59″E | |
| Copy of Ordinance relating to the Shipwreck Rescue off the coast of Dana 田名沖における難破船救助に関する言上写; Dana oki ni okeru nanpasen kyūjo ni kansuru gonjō utsushi | | Izena | private | | | 26°55′52″N 127°56′57″E | |
| Cultivation Development Documents 山野開墾に関する書類綴; San'ya kaikon ni kansuru shorui tsuzuri | | Izena | private | | | 26°55′55″N 127°55′34″E | |
| Copy of Iheyajima Kyūki 伊平屋島旧記写; Iheyajima kyūki utsushi | | Izena | private | | | 26°55′56″N 127°56′55″E | |
| Swords and Ancient Documents 刀剣及び古文書 tōken oyobi komonjo | | Miyakojima | private | | | 24°49′10″N 125°10′36″E | |
| Kawamitsu Family Genealogy 河充氏の系図; Kawamitsu-uji no keizu | | Miyakojima | private | | | 24°44′40″N 125°16′45″E | |
| Warrant of Appointment to the Shuri Ōyako of Chōki of the San'yō Family 山陽氏長季宛大首里大屋子職補任辞令書; San'yō-uji Chōki ate Ō Shuri Ōyako shoku bunin jireisho | | Ishigaki | private | | | 24°20′41″N 124°09′20″E | |
| Warrant of Appointment to the Shuri Ōyako of Shinhan of the Chōei Lineage 長栄氏真般宛大首里大屋子職補任辞令書; Chōei-uji Shinhan ate Ō Shuri Ōyako shoku bunin jireisho | | Ishigaki | private (kept at the Ishigaki City Yaeyama Museum) | | | 24°20′17″N 124°09′34″E | |
| Warrant of Appointment to the Ō Shuri Ōyako of Ken'ei of the Karin Lineage 夏林氏賢永宛大首里大屋子職補任辞令書; Karin-uji Ken'ei ate Ō Shuri Ōyako shoku bunin jireisho | | Ishigaki | private | | | 24°20′39″N 124°09′30″E | |
| Warrant of Appointment to the Ō Shuri Ōyako of Chōchi of the San'yō Lineage 山陽氏長致宛大首里大屋子職補任辞令書; San'yō-uji Chōchi ate Ō Shuri Ōyako shoku bunin jireisho | | Ishigaki | private | | | 24°20′41″N 124°09′20″E | |
| Warrant of Appointment to the Ō Shuri Ōyako of Tōkoku of the Matsumo Lineage 松茂氏當克宛大首里大屋子職補任辞令書; Matsumo-uji Tōkoku ate Ō Shuri Ōyako shoku bunin jireisho | | Ishigaki | private | | | 24°20′28″N 124°09′35″E | |
| Warrant of Appointment to the Ō Shuri Ōyako of Chōen of the San'yō Lineage 山陽氏長演宛大首里大屋子職補任辞令書; San'yō-uji Chōen ate Ō Shuri Ōyako shoku bunin jireisho | | Ishigaki | private | | | 24°20′41″N 124°09′20″E | |
| Warrant of Appointment to the Ō Shuri Ōyako of Kensoku of the Karin Lineage 夏林氏賢則宛大首里大屋子職補任辞令書; Karin-uji Kensoku ate Ō Shuri Ōyako shoku bunin jireisho | | Ishigaki | private | | | 24°20′39″N 124°09′30″E | |
| Warrant of Appointment to the Ō Shuri Ōyako of Tōen of the Matsumo Lineage 松茂氏當演宛大首里大屋子職補任辞令書; Matsumo-uji Tōen ate Ō Shuri Ōyako shoku bunin jireisho | | Ishigaki | private | | | 24°20′28″N 124°09′35″E | |
| Warrant of Appointment to the Ō Shuri Ōyako of Ken'ei of the Karin Lineage 夏林氏賢栄宛大首里大屋子職補任辞令; Karin-uji Ken'ei ate Ō Shuri Ōyako shoku bunin jireisho | | Ishigaki | private | | | 24°20′39″N 124°09′30″E | |
| Warrant of Appointment to the Ō Shuri Ōyako of Chōhō of the San'yō Lineage 山陽氏長房宛大首里大屋子職補任辞令書; San'yō-uji Chōhō ate Ō Shuri Ōyako shoku bunin jireisho | | Ishigaki | private | | | 24°20′46″N 124°09′19″E | |
| Warrant of Appointment to the Ō Shuri Ōyako of Kenho of the Karin Lineage 夏林氏賢保宛大首里大屋子職補任辞令書; Karin-uji Kenho ate Ō Shuri Ōyako shoku bunin jireisho | | Ishigaki | private | | | 24°20′39″N 124°09′30″E | |
| Warrant of Appointment to the Ō Shuri Ōyako of Chōyū of the San'yō Lineage 山陽氏長有宛大首里大屋子職補任辞令書; San'yō-uji Chōyū ate Ō Shuri ōyako shoku bunin jireisho | | Ishigaki | private | | | 24°20′41″N 124°09′20″E | |
| Warrant of Appointment to the Ō Shuri Ōyako of Tōsō of the Matsumo Lineage 松茂氏當宗宛大首里大屋子職補任辞令書; Matsumo-uji Tōsō ate Ō Shuri Ōyako shoku bunin jireisho | | Ishigaki | private | | | 24°20′28″N 124°09′35″E | |
| Takehara Family Documents 竹原家文書; Takehara-ke monjo | | Ishigaki | Ishigaki City (kept at the Ishigaki City Yaeyama Museum) | | | 24°20′17″N 124°09′34″E | |
| Document of Assignment to the Post of Yaeyama Ōamu (Daughter-in-Law) 八重山嶋大阿母前阿母嫁まひなまへの大阿母補任辞令書(付山陽姓系図家譜); Yaeyama-jima ōamu saki no Amu yome Mahinama e no Ōamu bunin jireisho (tsuketari San'yō-sei keizu kafu) | | Ishigaki | private (kept at the Ishigaki City Yaeyama Museum) | designation includes a genealogy of the San'yō lineage | | 24°20′17″N 124°09′34″E | |
| Document of Assignment to the Post of Yaeyama Ōamu (Daughter) 八重山嶋大阿母女子いんつめいへの大阿母補任辞令書(付山陽姓系図家譜); Yaeyama-jima Ōamu joshi Intsumei e no Ōamu bunin jireisho (tsuketari San'yō-sei keizu kafu) | | Ishigaki | private (kept at the Ishigaki City Yaeyama Museum) | designation includes a genealogy of the San'yō lineage | | 24°20′17″N 124°09′34″E | |
| Tomikawa Wēkata Sailors Guild Records 富川親方八重山島船手座例帳; Tomikawa Wēkata Yaeyama-jima funade za rei chō | | Ishigaki | Ishigaki City (kept at the Ishigaki City Yaeyama Museum) | | | 24°20′17″N 124°09′34″E | |
| Tomikawa Wēkata Village Public Records (Tōzato Village) 富川親方八重山島諸村公事帳（桃里村） Tomikawa Wēkata Yaeyama-jima sho mura kujichō (Tōzato-mura) | | Ishigaki | Ishigaki City (kept at the Ishigaki City Yaeyama Museum) | | | 24°20′17″N 124°09′34″E | |
| Tomikawa Wēkata Village Public Records (Komi Village) 富川親方八重山島諸村公事帳（古見村） Tomikawa Wēkata Yaeyama-jima sho mura kujichō (Komi-mura) | | Ishigaki | Ishigaki City (kept at the Ishigaki City Yaeyama Museum) | | | 24°20′17″N 124°09′34″E | |
| Tomikawa Wēkata Village Public Records (Kabira Village) 富川親方八重山島諸村公事帳（川平村） Tomikawa Wēkata Yaeyama-jima sho mura kujichō (Kabira-mura) | | Ishigaki | Ishigaki City (kept at the Ishigaki City Yaeyama Museum) | | | 24°20′17″N 124°09′34″E | |
| Tomikawa Wēkata Warehouse Overseer Public Records 富川親方八重山島蔵元公事帳; Tomikawa Wēkata Yaeyama-jima kuramoto kujichō | | Ishigaki | Ishigaki City (kept at the Ishigaki City Yaeyama Museum) | | | 24°20′17″N 124°09′34″E | |
| Yoseyama Wēkata Yaeyama Agricultural Books 与世山親方八重山島農務帳; Yoseyama Wēkata Yaeyama-jima nōmu chō (Miyara-mura) | | Ishigaki | Ishigaki City (kept at the Ishigaki City Yaeyama Museum) | | | 24°20′17″N 124°09′34″E | |
| Tomikawa Wēkata Yaeyama Notebooks (Miyara Village) 富川親方八重山島諸締帳（宮良村） Tomikawa Wēkata Yaeyama-jima sho shime chō (Miyara-mura) | | Ishigaki | Ishigaki City (kept at the Ishigaki City Yaeyama Museum) | | | 24°20′17″N 124°09′34″E | |
| Tomikawa Wēkata Yaeyama Notebooks (Kabira Village) 富川親方八重山島諸締帳（川平村） Tomikawa Wēkata Yaeyama-jima sho shime-chō (Kabira-mura) | | Ishigaki | Ishigaki City (kept at the Ishigaki City Yaeyama Museum) | | | 24°20′17″N 124°09′34″E | |
| Miyagi Shin'yū Family Funerary Records 宮城信勇家覚（葬札） Miyagi Shin'yū-ke oboe (sōsatsu) | | Ishigaki | Ishigaki City (kept at the Ishigaki City Yaeyama Museum) | | | 24°20′17″N 124°09′34″E | |
| Uehara Village Poll Tax Receipt Book 上原村人頭税請取帳; Uehara-mura jintōzei uketori-chō | | Ishigaki | Ishigaki City (kept at the Ishigaki City Yaeyama Museum) | | | 24°20′17″N 124°09′34″E | |
| Yasumura Family Documents 安村家文書; Yasumura-ke monjo | | Ishigaki | Ishigaki City (kept at the Ishigaki City Yaeyama Museum) | | | 24°20′17″N 124°09′34″E | |
| Star Chart 星圖 hoshi zu | | Ishigaki | Ishigaki City (kept at the Ishigaki City Yaeyama Museum) | | | 24°20′17″N 124°09′34″E | |

== See also ==
- Cultural Properties of Japan
- List of National Treasures of Japan (writings: Chinese books)
- List of National Treasures of Japan (writings: Japanese books)
- List of National Treasures of Japan (writings: others)
- List of National Treasures of Japan (ancient documents)
- Rekidai Hōan
- List of Cultural Properties of Japan - historical materials (Okinawa)
- Writing in the Ryukyu Kingdom
