= Okinawa Prefecture Archaeological Center =

Archaeology museum in Nishihara, Japan

- 沖縄県立埋蔵文化財センター
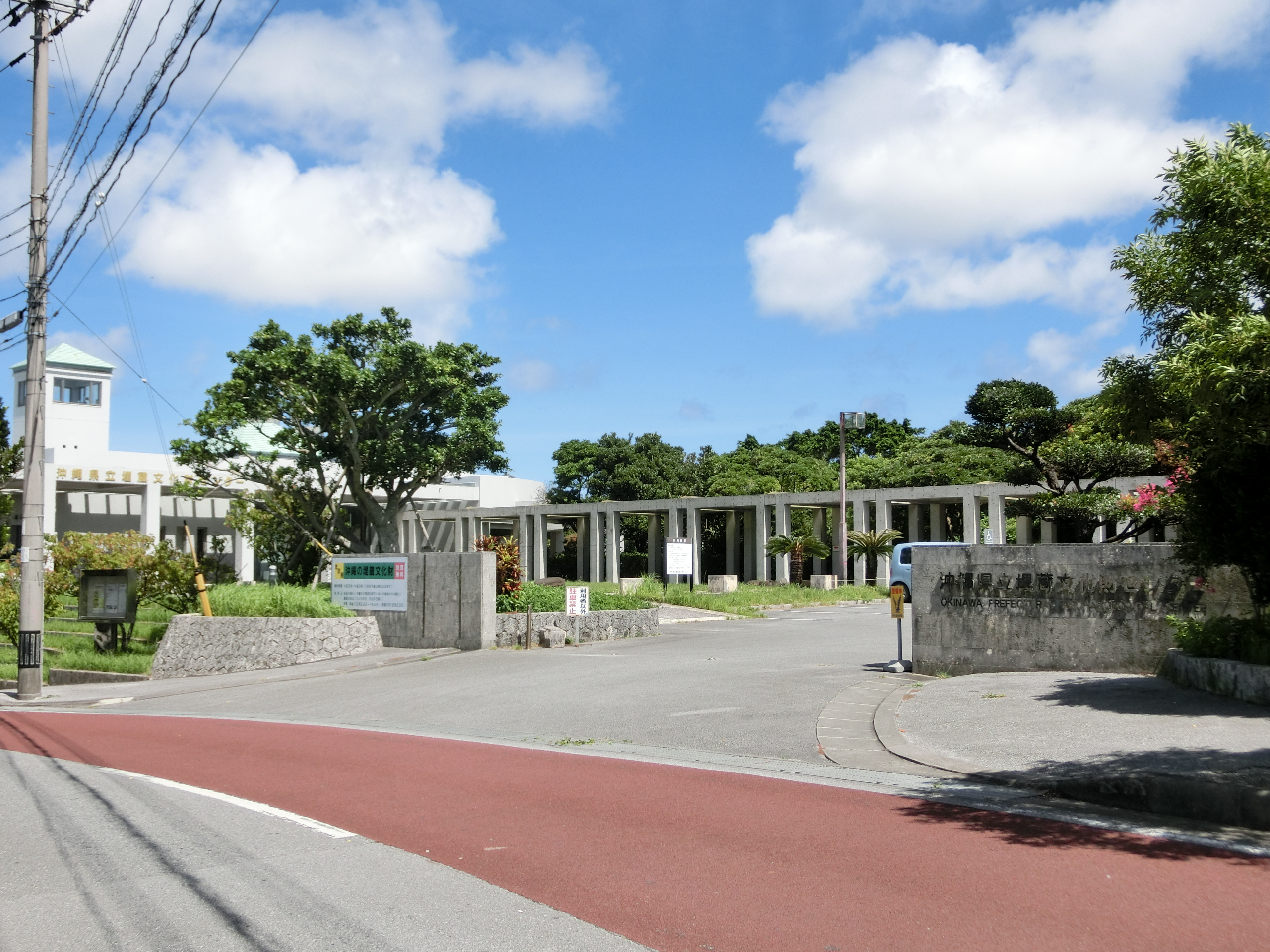

General information
- Location: 193-7 Uehara, Nishihara, Okinawa Prefecture, Japan
- Coordinates: 26°14′36″N 127°45′34″E
- Opened: 1 April 1990

Website
- Official website (ja)

The Okinawa Prefecture Archaeological Center (沖縄県立埋蔵文化財センター, Okinawa-ken Maizō Bunkazai Sentā) opened in Nishihara, Okinawa Prefecture, Japan in 2000. The facility researches, preserves, and utilizes through display and other activities the prefecture's Buried Cultural Properties. As of the early Reiwa era, around four thousand such sites have been identified in Okinawa Prefecture, from the Palaeolithic to modern times, including shell mounds, settlements, tombs, gusuku, underwater sites, and war ruins.

== See also ==
- Okinawa Prefectural Museum
- List of Historic Sites of Japan (Okinawa)
- List of Cultural Properties of Japan - archaeological materials (Okinawa)
- List of Cultural Properties of Japan - historical materials (Okinawa)
- Ryukyu University Museum (Fūjukan)
