= List of cultural properties of Japan – historical materials (Okinawa) =

This list is of the cultural properties of Japan designated in the category of historical materials (歴史資料, rekishi shiryō) for the Prefecture of Okinawa.

== National Cultural Properties ==
As of 1 August 2020, six Important Cultural Properties have been designated (including one *National Treasure), being of national significance.

Property	Date	Municipality	Ownership	Comments	Image	Coordinates	Ref.
*Materials relating to the Shō Family of Ryūkyū Kings 琉球国王尚家関係資料; Ryūkyū kokuō Shō-ke kankei shiryō	The reigns of the second Shō dynasty to Meiji period	Naha	Naha City (kept at the Naha City Museum of History)	1,251 items, of which 85 are craft works and the remainder writings; the former comprise (a) royal costume (8 items): royal crown known as Hibenkan or Tamanchaabui, black silk with 288 gold, silver, crystal, and coral beads and a gold kanzashi engraved with a dragon; two ceremonial costumes of Chinese cloth; two belts - one with twenty previous stones, the other braided; a pair of boots; undergarments; (b) clothing (57 items): 42 bingata robes and 15 of orimono, some with banana fibre cloth; (c) metalwork (5 items): a gold cup, silver rinsing bowl, pair of silver bowls with stands, set of six octagonal silver goblets, and pair of tin bottles covered with glass beads; (d) lacquerware (9 items): of red lacquer - a covered multi-tiered food box, a set of footed trays, a rinsing bowl with stand, and a writing box; of black lacquer - a set of dishes and case, incense box, tray for scrolls, writing-paper box, and inkstone case; (e) ceramics (3 items of Tsuboya Ware (壷屋焼)): a candle-stand, portable brazier, and jar; (f) swords (3 items): sword known as Chiyoganemaru (千代金丸) with which, according to the Kyūyō Chronicles, the King of Hokuzan committed suicide in 1416; sword known as Chiganemaru (治金丸) which, according to the Kyūyō, Nakasone Toyomiya gave to Shō Shin in 1522; and sword known as Chatan Nakiri (北谷菜切)		26°12′50″N 127°40′45″E	
Letter from the Ming Dynasty Hongzhi Emperor to Shō Shin 明孝宗勅諭〈琉球国中山王尚真宛／〉 Min Kōsō chokuyu (Ryūkyū-koku Chūzan-ō Shō Shin ate)	1487	Naha	Okinawa Prefecture (kept at the Okinawa Prefectural Museum and Art Museum)	47.05 centimetres (18.52 in) by 178.8 centimetres (70.4 in)		26°13′36″N 127°41′38″E	
Photographs by Kamakura Yoshitarō for his Investigation into Ryūkyū Art 琉球芸術調査写真<鎌倉芳太郎撮影／> Ryūkyū geijutsu chōsa shashin (Kamakura Yoshitarō satsuei)	Taishō period	Naha	Okinawa Prefecture (kept at the Okinawa Prefectural University of Arts)	2,080 items		26°13′10″N 127°43′08″E	
Map of the Ryūkyū Kingdom - Maps of the Magiri 琉球国之図・間切図; Ryūkyū-koku no zu・magiri-zu	C18	Naha	Okinawa Prefecture (kept at Okinawa Prefectural Museum and Art Museum)	8 items; one scroll of the whole kingdom and seven maps of the magiri		26°13′36″N 127°41′38″E	
Materials relating to the Ie Udun Family 伊江御殿家関係資料; Ie udun-ke kankei shiryō	Second Shō dynasty to Meiji period		private	146 items			
Sketches of the Yaeyama Kuramoto Master Painter (Miyara Ansen's former possession) 八重山蔵元絵師画稿類（宮良安宣旧蔵） Yaeyama kuramoto eshi gakō-rui (Miyara Ansen kyūzō)	Second Shō dynasty to Meiji period	Ishigaki	Ishigaki City (kept at the Ishigaki City Yaeyama Museum)	90 items		24°20′17″N 124°09′34″E	

== Prefectural Cultural Properties ==
As of 1 May 2019, six properties have been designated at a prefectural level.

Property	Date	Municipality	Ownership	Comments	Image	Coordinates	Ref.
Remains of a Bronze Bell (former Naminoue-gū Korean bell) 銅鐘残欠 (旧波上宮朝鮮鐘) dōshō zanketsu (kyū Naminōe-gū Chōsen shō)	Goryeo	Naha	Okinawa Prefecture (kept at the Okinawa Prefectural Museum and Art Museum)	the lengthy inscription dates the bell to Kentoku 3 (顕徳) or 956; the bell, designated a National Treasure in 1907 in accordance with the 1897 Ancient Temples and Shrines Preservation Law, was largely destroyed in 1945		26°13′36″N 127°41′38″E	for all refs see
Ankokuzan Stele of Flowers and Trees 安国山樹花木記碑; Ankokuzan jukaboku kihi	1427	Naha	Okinawa Prefecture (kept at the Okinawa Prefectural Museum and Art Museum)	now an Important Cultural Property in the ancient documents category		26°13′36″N 127°41′38″E	
Sanpu Ryūmyaku-hi 三府龍脈碑; Sanpu ryūmyaku hi	1750	Nago	Nago City (kept at the Nago Museum)	the inscription records a proposal to relocate the capital of the three kingdoms (Hokuzan, Chūzan, and Nanzan) from Shuri to Nago		26°35′11″N 127°59′13″E	
Materials relating to the Uezu Family 上江洲家資料; Uezu-ke shiryō		Kumejima	private (kept at the Kumejima Museum and Uezu Family Residence (上江洲家住宅) )	1790 items, comprising 42 calligraphic works, 14 paintings, 109 craftworks, and 1,625 records relating to the early modern and modern period		26°20′30″N 126°45′50″E	
Sketches by the Kuramoto Painter 蔵元絵師の画稿; Kuramoto eshi no gakō	C18/19	Ishigaki	Ishigaki City (kept at the Ishigaki City Yaeyama Museum)	114 items		24°20′17″N 124°09′34″E	
Materials relating to the Ie Family 伊江家資料; Ie-ke shiryō		Naha	private (kept at the Naha City Museum of History)	122 items, with 29 associated items comprising 14 letters, 11 calligraphic works, 1 painting, and 3 pieces of lacquerware; 113 items have since been designated an Important Cultural Property as Materials relating to the Ieudun Family (see above), leaving 11 items (sic), with the associated items		26°12′50″N 127°40′45″E	

== Municipal Cultural Properties ==
As of 1 May 2019, forty-three properties have been designated at a municipal level.

Property	Date	Municipality	Ownership	Comments	Image	Coordinates	Ref.
Maps of the Villages in Nakijin Magiri, Kunigami District 国頭郡今帰仁間切各村全図及び字図; Kunigami-gun Nakijin magiri kakuson zenzu oyobi aza-zu		Nakijin	Nakijin Village			26°41′30″N 127°55′38″E	for all refs see
Maps of Heshiki Village in Nakijin Magiri 今帰仁間切平敷村略図及び平敷村字図; Nakijin magiri Heshiki-son ryakuzu oyobi Heshiki-son aza-zu		Nakijin	Nakijin Village			26°41′30″N 127°55′38″E	
Former Jahana Elementary School Site Hō-an-den 旧謝花尋常高等小学校跡 奉安殿 kyū Jahana jinjō kōtō shōgakkō ato hōanden	Empire of Japan	Motobu	Motobu Town			26°41′02″N 127°53′50″E	
Tōjin Baka Tombstone 唐人墓の墓碑; Tōjin baka no bohi		Onna	Onna Village			26°26′17″N 127°48′08″E	
Onna Village Shirube-ishi 恩納村の印部石; Onna-son no shirube ishi		Onna	Onna Village			26°26′17″N 127°48′08″E	
Kunigami District Onna Magiri: Maps of Each Village, etc 国頭郡恩納間切各村全図及び字図等; Kunigami-gun Onna magiri kaku-son zen-zu oyobi aza-zu tō		Onna	Onna Village			26°26′17″N 127°48′08″E	
Genealogy of the Tan Lineage: Branch Line 「湛姓家譜」支流一冊; Tan-sei kafu shiryū issatsu		Ginoza	Ginoza Village			26°29′17″N 127°59′02″E	
Materials from Ginoza Village relating to the Battle of Okinawa 沖縄戦関連宜野座村資料; Okinawa-sen kanren Ginoza-son shiryō		Ginoza	Ginoza Village			26°28′57″N 127°58′24″E	
Survey Stone ハル石(印部石 ミ 赤ひら原); Haru-ishi		Okinawa	Okinawa Municipal Museum (沖縄市立郷土博物館)			26°19′54″N 127°47′42″E	
Survey Stone ハル石(印部石 ア 木の下原); Haru-ishi		Okinawa	Okinawa Municipal Museum (沖縄市立郷土博物館)			26°19′54″N 127°47′42″E	
Survey Stone ハル石(印部石 さ さく原); Haru-ishi		Okinawa	Okinawa City			26°20′45″N 127°48′53″E	
Yomitan Zero Milestone 読谷村道路元標; Yomitan-son dōro genpyō		Yomitan	Yomitan Village			26°23′57″N 127°45′30″E	
Hija Bridge Inscription 比謝橋碑文; Hija-bashi hibun		Yomitan	Yomitan Village			26°22′13″N 127°45′23″E	
Kamuiyaki Excavated from Uchima, Nishihara 西原町内間散布地No.1出土のカムィ焼; Nishihara-chō Uchima sanpuchi No.1 shutsudo no kamuiyaki		Nishihara	Nishihara Town			26°13′16″N 127°45′36″E	
Meiji Land Registry Map 明治土地台帳附属地図; Meiji tochi daichō fuzoku chizu		Ginowan	Ginowan City			26°17′24″N 127°46′54″E	
Madan Bridge Inscription 重修真玉橋碑文; Chōshū Madan-bashi hibun		Tomigusuku	private			26°10′26″N 127°40′27″E	
Meiji Land Registry Map 明治土地台帳附属地図; Meiji tochi daichō fuzoku chizu		Nanjō	Nanjō City			26°10′34″N 127°44′40″E	
Miyagusuku Bridge Restoration Stele 修宮城橋碑; Shū Miyagusuku-bashi no hi		Haebaru				26°11′13″N 127°43′50″E	
Uhwi Bridge Stele 宇平橋碑; Uhwi-hashi no hi		Haebaru				26°11′13″N 127°43′50″E	
Shirube dote-ishi 印部土手石; Shirube dote ishi		Haebaru				26°11′13″N 127°43′50″E	
Public records of Kumejima Nakazato Magiri 久米仲里間切公事帳; Kume Nakazato magiri kuji-chō		Kumejima	Kumejima Town Board of Education (久米島町教育委員会)			26°20′26″N 126°48′19″E	
Public records of the villages of Kumejima Nakazato Magiri 久米仲里間切諸村公事帳; Kume Nakazato magiri shoson kuji-chō		Kumejima	Kumejima Town Board of Education (久米島町教育委員会)			26°20′26″N 126°48′19″E	
Criminal Records 科人公事帳 toganin kuji-chō		Kumejima	Kumejima Town Board of Education (久米島町教育委員会)			26°20′26″N 126°48′19″E	
Anchor Stones from Uegusuku Castle 宇江城城跡の碇石; Uegusuku-jō ato no ikariishi		Kumejima	Kumejima Town Board of Education (久米島町教育委員会)			26°20′26″N 126°48′19″E	
Materials relating to the Nakasone Family of the Chūdō Lineage 忠導氏仲宗根家関係資料; Chūdō-uji Nakasone-ke kankei shiryō		Miyakojima	Miyakojima City Museum			24°47′47″N 125°19′04″E	
Materials relating to the Motomura Family of the Shōei Lineage 向裔氏本村家関係資料; Shōei-uji Motomura-ke kankei shiryō		Miyakojima	private			24°48′10″N 125°16′49″E	
Genealogy of the Main Line of the Ntabaru Lineage 土原氏正統系図、家譜; Natabaru-uji seitō keizu, kafu		Tarama	private			26°09′51″N 127°42′12″E	
Genealogy of the Branch Line of the Ntabaru Lineage 土原氏支流系図、家譜; Natabaru-uji shiryū keizu, kafu		Tarama	private			24°40′08″N 124°42′12″E	
Genealogy of the Main Line of the Shōei Lineage 向裔氏正統系図、家譜; Shōei-uji seitō keizu, kafu		Tarama	private			24°40′14″N 124°42′09″E	
Genealogy of a Branch Line of the Shōei Lineage 向裔氏支流系図、家譜; Shōei-uji shiryū keizu, kafu		Tarama	private			26°13′02″N 127°41′56″E	
Genealogy of a Branch Line of the Shōei Lineage 向裔氏支流系図、家譜; Shōei-uji shiryū keizu, kafu		Tarama	private			26°14′38″N 127°43′38″E	
Genealogy of a Branch Line of the Shōei Lineage 向裔氏支流系図、家譜; Shōei-uji shiryū keizu, kafu		Tarama	private			26°13′14″N 127°43′09″E	
Genealogy of the Chūdō Lineage 忠導氏系図、家譜; Chūdō-uji keizu, kafu		Tarama	private			24°40′13″N 124°42′12″E	
Genealogy of the Urato Lineage 浦渡氏系図、家譜; Urato-uji keizu, kafu		Tarama	private			24°40′09″N 124°42′11″E	
Land Register 土地台帳 tochi daichō		Tarama	Tarama Village			24°40′10″N 124°42′06″E	
Land Tax Register 地租名寄帳 chiso nayose-chō		Tarama	Tarama Village			24°40′10″N 124°42′06″E	
Land Registry Map 地籍図 chiseki-zu		Tarama	Tarama Village			24°40′10″N 124°42′06″E	
Sample Patterns 御絵図 miezu	early C18	Ishigaki	Ishigaki City (kept at the Ishigaki City Yaeyama Museum)	46 items; designs for tribute cloth for the Ryūkyū court; also a Municipal Cultural Property - Craftworks		24°20′17″N 124°09′34″E	
Letter of Appreciation to Toyokawa Zensa for the Rescue Operation in the Senkaku Islands 豊川善佐宛尖閣列島遭難救護の感謝状; Toyokawa Zensa ate Senkaku rettō sōnan kyūgo no kanshajō	1920	Ishigaki	private (kept at the Ishigaki City Yaeyama Museum)	sent by the Consul of the Republic of China in Nagasaki on 20 May 1920 for the rescue the previous winter by villagers from Ishigaki of 31 Chinese fishermen shipwrecked in the Senkaku Islands		24°20′17″N 124°09′34″E	
Letter of Appreciation to Tamayose Sonhan for the Rescue Operation in the Senkaku Islands 玉代勢孫伴宛尖閣列島遭難救護の感謝状; Tamayose Sonhan ate Senkaku rettō sōnan kyūgo no kanshajō	1920	Ishigaki	Ishigaki City (kept at the Ishigaki City Yaeyama Museum)	sent by the Consul of the Republic of China in Nagasaki on 20 May 1920 for the rescue the previous winter by villagers from Ishigaki of 31 Chinese fishermen shipwrecked in the Senkaku Islands		24°20′17″N 124°09′34″E	
Tile Document 瓦証文 kawara shōmon		Ishigaki	private (kept at the Ishigaki City Yaeyama Museum)			24°20′17″N 124°09′34″E	
Tōjin Baka Stele 唐人墓碑; Tōjin bohi		Ishigaki	Ishigaki City (kept at the Ishigaki City Yaeyama Museum)	commemorates the Chinese coolies who, after suffering indignities such as having their pigtails cut, mutinied aboard the Robert Bowne in 1852 while on their way from Amoy to San Francisco and put ashore in Ishigaki		24°20′17″N 124°09′34″E	
Tonoshiro Elementary School Hō-an-den 旧登野城尋常高等小学校の奉安殿 kyū-Tonoshiro jinjōkōtō shōgakkō no hōanden	Empire of Japan	Ishigaki	Ishigaki City (at Tonoshiro Elementary School (登野城小学校))			24°20′32″N 124°09′49″E	

== See also ==
- Cultural Properties of Japan
- List of National Treasures of Japan (historical materials)
- List of Historic Sites of Japan (Okinawa)
- List of Cultural Properties of Japan - archaeological materials (Okinawa)
- Writing in the Ryukyu Kingdom
