= List of former cultural properties (Japan) =

This list is of former cultural properties of Japan that have been struck from the register as a result of heavy damage or total destruction during the twentieth and early twenty-first centuries, as identified and catalogued by the Agency for Cultural Affairs.

== Structures ==
101 properties

=== Castles ===
17 properties

Property	Date	Municipality	Date of designation	Date of loss	Comments	Image	Coordinates
Fukuyama (Matsumae) Castle; Tenshu, East Wall of Main Gate 福山城 (松前城) 天守、本丸御門東塀; Fukuyama-jō (Mastumae-jō) tenshu, honmaru gomon higashi-bei	Edo period	Matsumae	8 May 1941	5 June 1949 (fire)	two structures: three-storey tenshu with copper roof; 17.9m stretch of wall with copper roof		41°25′47″N 140°06′30″E
Sendai Castle Ōtemon 仙台城大手門; Sendai-jō ōtemon	Edo period	Sendai	14 December 1931	10 July 1945 (air raid of 10 July 1945)			38°15′08″N 140°51′21″E
Sendai Castle Sumi-yagura 仙台城隅櫓; Sendai-jō sumi-yagura	Edo period	Sendai	14 December 1931	10 July 1945 (air raid of 10 July 1945)	corner tower, part single storey, part two storey		38°15′08″N 140°51′21″E
Ōgaki Castle 大垣城; Ōgaki-jō	Momoyama to Edo period	Ōgaki	20 April 1936	29 July 1945 (fire from air raid)	two structures, each with two associated structures: four-storey tenshu, with associated connecting west and east wings (天守附西附多門、東附多門); and two-storey northeast corner tower, with associated wings (良隅櫓附先手武多門、宗門多門)		35°21′43″N 136°36′58″E
Nagoya Castle 名古屋城; Nagoya-jō	Momoyama to Edo period	Nagoya	11 December 1930	Lost in air raid of 14 July 1945	twenty structures. Most were reconstructed after the war, those that survived were re-designated as Important Cultural Properties.		35°11′02″N 136°54′01″E
Wakayama Castle 和歌山城; Wakayama-jō	Edo period	Wakayama	13 May 1935	Lost in air raid of 9 July 1945	eleven structures		34°13′39″N 135°10′17″E
Okayama Castle Tenshu 岡山城天守; Okayama-jō tenshu	Momoyama period	Okayama	19 January 1931	Lost in air raid of 29 June 1945	six-storey tenshu with connecting storehouse		34°39′54″N 133°56′10″E
Okayama Castle Ishiyamamon 岡山城石山門 (渋蔵門); Okayama-jō ishiyamamon (shibukuramon)	Momoyama period	Okayama	19 January 1931	Lost in air raid of 29 June 1945			34°39′54″N 133°56′10″E
Hiroshima Castle Tenshu 広島城天守; Hiroshima-jō tenshu	Momoyama period	Hiroshima	19 January 1931	Lost in atomic bombing of 6 August 1945	five-storey tenshu with connecting tower		34°24′05″N 132°27′34″E
Matsuyama Castle 松山城; Matsuyama-jō	Edo period	Matsuyama	13 May 1935	26 July 1945 (fire from air raid); 27 February 1949 (fire)	fourteen structures; lost in 1945: Tenjin-yagura, Bagu-yagura, Taiko-yagura, Tatsumi-yagura, Inuimon, Higashi-Tsuzuki-yagura of Inuimon, Taiko-mon, Tsuzuki-yagura of Taikomon, West Wall of Inuimon, East Wall of Taikomon, West Wall of Taikomon; lost in 1949: Tsutsuimon, Higashi-Tsuzuki-yagura of Tsutsuimon, Nishi-Tsuzuki-yagura of Tsutsuimon		33°50′44″N 132°45′56″E
Uwajima Castle Ōtemon 宇和島城追手門; Uwajima-jō ōtemon	Edo period	Uwajima	30 January 1934	13 July 1945 (fire from air raid)			33°13′09″N 132°34′04″E
Shuri Castle Shureimon 首里城守礼門; Shuri-jō shureimon	Muromachi period	Naha (former Shuri)	23 January 1933	c.12 May 1945 (battle)			26°13′05″N 127°43′01″E
Shuri Castle Kankaimon 首里城歓会門; Shuri-jō kankaimon	Muromachi period	Naha (former Shuri)	23 January 1933	c.12 May 1945 (battle)			26°13′04″N 127°43′04″E
Shuri Castle Zuisenmon 首里城瑞泉門; Shuri-jō zuisenmon	Muromachi period	Naha (former Shuri)	23 January 1933	c.12 May 1945 (battle)			26°13′03″N 127°43′05″E
Shuri Castle Shiroganemon 首里城白銀門; Shuri-jō shiroganemon	Muromachi period	Naha (former Shuri)	23 January 1933	c.12 May 1945 (battle)			26°13′02″N 127°43′14″E

=== Mausolea ===
15 properties

Property	Date	Municipality	Date of designation	Date of loss	Comments	Image	Coordinates
Mausoleum of Date Masamune 伊達政宗霊廟; Date Masamune reibyō	1637	Sendai	14 December 1931	10 July 1945 (fire from air raid)	seven structures: Zuihōden (瑞鳳殿), Karamon (唐門), Sukibei (透塀) (fence), South Corridor (南廊下), Haiden (拝殿), Hashi (橋), Gokusho (御供所), Connecting Corridor (繋廊下), Nehan-mon (涅槃門)		38°15′03″N 140°51′56″E

=== Miscellaneous structures ===
1 property

Property	Date	Municipality	Date of designation	Date of loss	Comments	Image	Coordinates
Ishioka First Power Plant Water Tank 石岡第一発電所施設 水槽; Ishioka dai-ichi hatsudensho shisetsu suisō	Meiji period	Kitaibaraki	2 October 2008	11 March 2011 (2011 Tōhoku earthquake)			36°47′31″N 140°39′15″E

=== Shrines ===
19 properties

=== Temples ===
40 properties

=== Residences ===
9 properties

Property	Date	Municipality	Date of designation	Date of loss	Comments	Image	Coordinates
Hanyū Family Residence 羽生家住宅（茨城県新治郡八郷町） Hanyū-ke jūtaku	Edo period	Ishioka (formerly Yasato)	3 February 1976	25 February 1993 (fire)	two structures: Main House (主屋, Omoya) and House for the Old Master (隠居所, Inkyo-jo); designation included associated plans (家相図)		36°12′28″N 140°09′28″E
Omotemon (Former Satsuma Mansion Gate) 表門（旧薩摩装束屋門） Omotemon (kyū-Satsuma shōzoku yashiki mon)	Edo period	Chiyoda	14 December 1931	25 May 1945 (air raid)	from the Tokyo residence of the Shimazu clan, former daimyō of the Satsuma Domain		

== Works of fine art ==
74 properties

=== Paintings ===
12 properties

Property	Date	Municipality	Ownership	Date of designation	Date of loss	Comments	Image	Coordinates
Pictorial Biography of Ippen Shōnin, colour on paper 紙本着色一遍上人絵詞伝 shihon chakushoku Ippen shōnin ekotoba den	Kamakura period	Fujisawa	Shōjōkō-ji	1 August 1899	6 July 1911 (fire)	ten scrolls		35°20′54″N 139°29′19″E
Nagoya Castle Honmaru Palace wall and sliding-door paintings 名古屋城本丸御殿障壁画; Nagoya-jō honmaru goten shōhekiga	Momoyama to Edo period	Nagoya	Nagoya City (kept at Nagoya Castle)	26 June 1942	4 May 1945 (fire from air raid)	ninety-five panels; other panels had been removed for safekeeping; three hundred and thirty-one surviving panels have been designated an Important Cultural Property Honmaru Palace and all the paintings were reconstructed by 2020.		35°11′02″N 136°54′01″E
Portrait of Tōdō Takatora, colour on silk 絹本着色藤堂高虎像 shihon chakushoku Tōdō Takatora zō	Edo period	Tsu	Kanshō-in (寒松院)	14 April 1906	18 July 1945 (fire from air raid)	inscribed by Tenkai (replica pictured)		34°42′53″N 136°30′53″E
Willows and Reeds & Loquats, colour on gold ground 金地着色柳及蘆図・枇杷図 kinji chakushoku yanagi oyobi ashi zu・biwa zu	Momoyama period	Kyōto	Chishaku-in	8 August 1919	17 May 1947 (fire)	ten panels; wall and sliding-door paintings from the Shinden Higashi-no-ma		34°59′17″N 135°46′33″E
Bamboo & Hinoki and Daimyō Oaks, colour on gold ground 金地着色竹図・檜及柏図 kinji chakushoku take zu・hinoki oyobi kashiwa zu	Momoyama period	Kyōto	Chishaku-in	8 August 1919	17 May 1947 (fire)	six panels; wall and sliding-door paintings from the Shinden Nishi-no-ma		34°59′17″N 135°46′33″E
Wall and sliding-door paintings from the Hōjō 方丈障壁画 hōjō shōhekiga	1641	Kyōto	Daitoku-ji	5 September 1944	20 July 1966 (fire)	one of the eighty-four panels was lost; ink on paper, by Kanō Tan'yū; although the record was updated, designation has continued (now an Important Cultural Property)		35°02′38″N 135°44′46″E

=== Sculptures ===
34 properties

Property	Date	Municipality	Ownership	Date of designation	Date of loss	Comments	Image	Coordinates
Seated Wooden Statue of Priest Motsugai 木造物外和尚座像 mokuzō Motusgai oshō zazō	1370	Tachikawa	Fusai-ji (普済寺)	14 April 1913	4 April 1995 (fire)			35°41′26″N 139°24′06″E

=== Crafts ===
16 properties

Property	Date	Municipality	Ownership	Date of designation	Date of loss	Comments	Image	Coordinates
Bronze Bell 銅鐘 dōshō	Goryeo	Naha	Naminoue-gū	27 May 1907	Lost in fire, 1945			26°13′13″N 127°40′17″E

=== Calligraphic works ===
10 properties

Property	Date	Municipality	Ownership	Date of designation	Date of loss	Comments	Image	Coordinates
Engi-shiki, ink on paper 紙本墨書延喜式 shihon bokusho Engi-shiki	Heian period	Shinjuku	private	30 January 1934	10 March 1945 (fire from air raid of 10 March 1945)	five scrolls (vols 1–5)		35°41′46″N 139°44′02″E
Notes on the Doctrines of the Kegon Sutra, ink on paper 紙本墨書華厳文義要決 shihon bokusho Kegon mongi yōketsu	Heian period	Shinjuku	private	4 July 1938	14 April 1945 (fire from air raid)	volume one, with the Tōdaiji Fujumonkō on the back		35°40′55″N 139°43′12″E
Lotus Sutra, ink on paper 紙本墨書法華経 shihon bokusho Hoke-kyō	1352	Kamakura	Zokutō-an (続燈庵) (subtemple of Engaku-ji)	4 April 1905	1 September 1923 (fire from Great Kantō earthquake)	one scroll, in the hand of Ashikaga Takauji		35°20′21″N 139°32′58″E
Writing in the hand of Retired Emperor Kōmyō-in, ink on paper 紙本墨書光明院宸翰 shihon bokusho Kōmyō-in shinkan	Nanboku-chō period	Fukui	Asuwa Jinja (足羽神社)	7 April 1900	19 July 1945 (fire from air raid of 19 July 1945)			36°03′31″N 136°12′35″E
Writing in the hand of Emperor Ninkō, ink on paper 紙本墨書仁孝天皇宸翰 shihon bokusho Kōmyō-in shinkan	late Edo period	Fukui	Asuwa Jinja (足羽神社)	7 April 1900	19 July 1945 (fire from air raid of 19 July 1945)			36°03′31″N 136°12′35″E
Taiheiki, ink on paper 紙本墨書太平記 shihon bokusho Taiheiki	Muromachi period	Kyōto	Ryōan-ji	5 April 1909	18 March 1929 (fire)	one scroll lost of the thirteen; although the record was updated, designation has continued (now an Important Cultural Property)		35°02′04″N 135°43′06″E
Lotus Sutra, ink on paper 紙本墨書法華経 shihon bokusho Hoke-kyō	1689	Yawata	Iwashimizu Hachimangū	30 April 1935	12 February 1947 (fire)	eight scrolls, in the hand of Princess Tsuneko (常子内親王)		34°52′47″N 135°42′00″E
Yuiitsu Shinron, ink on paper 紙本墨書唯一神論 shihon bokusho Yuiitsu Shinron	Tang	Kōbe	private	23 January 1923	12 March 1945 (fire from air raid)	one scroll, from a Tang translation of a Christian text; from Dunhuang; cf. Jingjiao Documents		34°42′47″N 135°15′40″E
Documents of Seinan-in 西南院文書; Seinan-in monjo	Kamakura to Edo period	Kōya	Seinan-in (西南院)	18 December 1959	18 December 1969 (fire)	four of the eleven scrolls were damaged; although the record was updated, designation has continued (now an Important Cultural Property)		34°12′46″N 135°34′30″E
Anthology of Poems in Memory of the Wars between the Taira and the Minamoto, ink on paper 紙本墨書懐古詩歌帖 shihon bokusho Kaikoshi kajō	Muromachi to Edo period	Shimonoseki	Akama-gū	14 April 1906	2 July 1945 (fire from air raid)	one volume		33°57′34″N 130°56′55″E

=== Stone monuments ===
2 properties

Property	Date	Municipality	Ownership	Date of designation	Date of loss	Comments	Image	Coordinates
Stele (Ankokuzan Jukaboku no Ki) 石碑（安国山樹華木之記） seki-hi (Ankokuzan jukaboku no ki)	1427	Naha (formerly Shuri)	Shuri City	25 October 1937	1945	erected by King Shō Hashi in 1427, the inscription records the planting of trees and flowers on Ankoku Hill, formed with fill from the digging of Ryūtan pond; the stele was badly damaged in 1945; kept at Okinawa Prefectural Museum, it is scheduled to be re-designated an Important Cultural Property in Autumn 2019		26°13′05″N 127°43′02″E
Stone Signposts 石標 seki-hyō	1527	Naha (formerly Shuri)	Shuri City	25 October 1937	1945	a pair of stelai inscribed with the injunction to dismount from one's horse; formerly flanking the entrance to Sōgen-ji, only one survived the battle of Okinawa		26°13′13″N 127°41′26″E

== See also ==
- Cultural Properties of Japan
- Lists of National Treasures of Japan
- Conservation Techniques for Cultural Properties
- Hague Convention for the Protection of Cultural Property in the Event of Armed Conflict
