= Ryukyu University Museum (Fūjukan) =

- 琉球大学博物館（風樹館）
- Location within Okinawa Prefecture

General information
- Location: 1 Senbaru, Nishihara, Okinawa Prefecture, Japan
- Coordinates: 26°15′01″N 127°45′53″E
- Opened: April 2015

Website
- Official website

Ryukyu University Museum (Fūjukan) (琉球大学博物館（風樹館）, Ryūkyū Daigaku Hakubutsukan (Fūjukan)) is a university museum affiliated with the University of the Ryukyus in Nishihara, Okinawa Prefecture, Japan. Of the collection of 160,000 items, which includes zoological type specimens and cultural artefacts such as the remains of the sundial from Shuri Castle and examples of warazan, some fifteen hundred are included in the permanent exhibition.

== History ==
The original Fūjukan was donated to the university in 1967, while it was still located on the former Shuri campus. In 1983, with the relocation of the University to the Senbaru campus, planning began for a new specimen repository. Construction of the new facility was completed in March 1985 and, after the transfer in of the collection, the new Fūjukan opened in September of the same year. In 2015, the Fūjukan was elevated to the status of University Museum.

== Publications ==
- Fauna Ryukyuana
- Catalogue of Materials Deposited in The University Museum (Fujukan), University of the Ryukyus (琉球大学資料館（風樹館）収蔵資料目録)

== See also ==
- Okinawa Prefectural Museum
