= Saitō Hō-on Kai Museum of Natural History =

Museum in Sendai, Miyagi Prefecture, Japan

- 斎藤報恩会自然史博物館
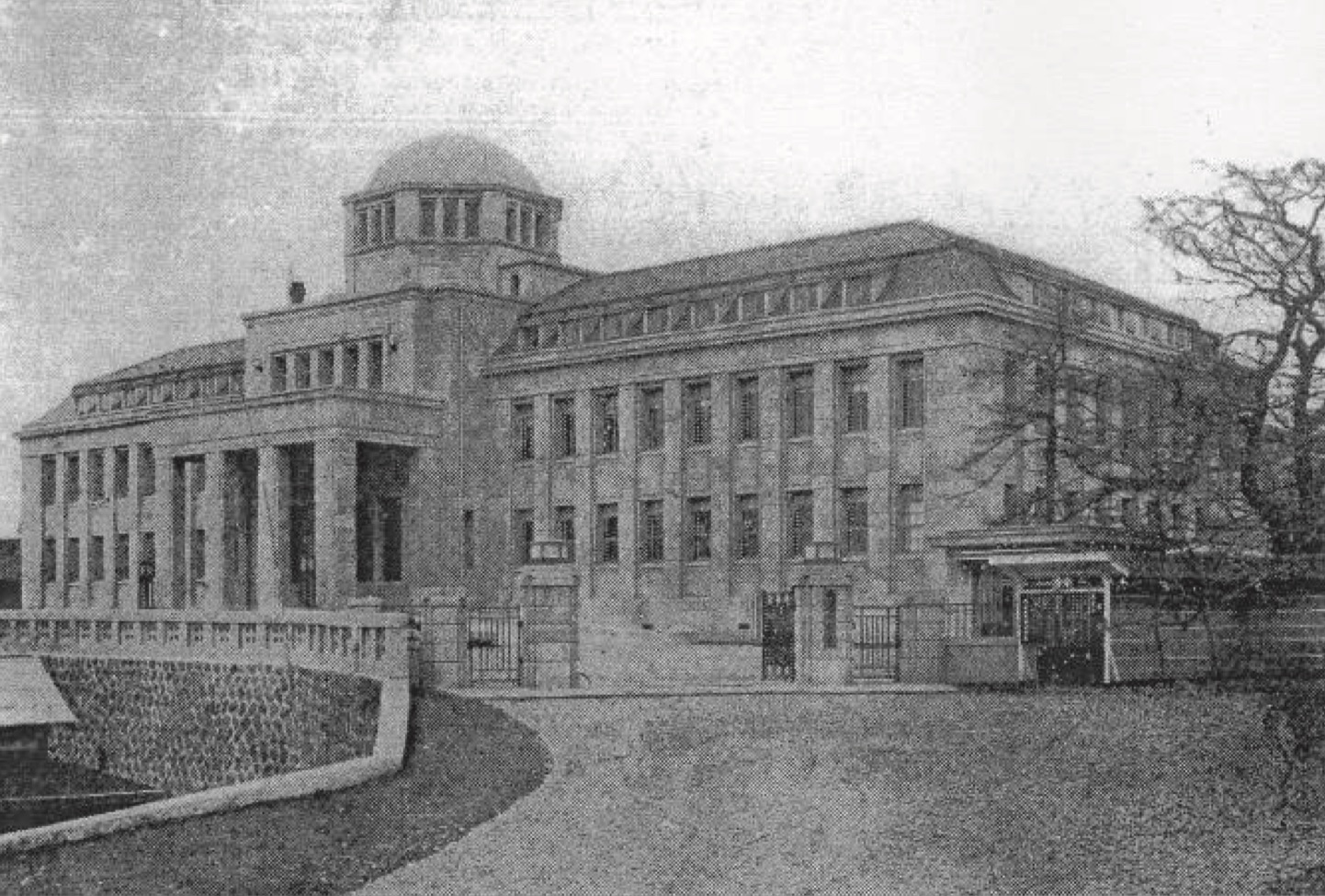
- Saito Hō-on kai Museum in 1933

General information
- Location: Sendai, Miyagi Prefecture, Japan
- Opened: November 1933

Design and construction
- Architect: Ogura Tsuyoshi

Saitō Hō-on Kai Museum of Natural History (斎藤報恩会自然史博物館, Saitō Hō-on Kai Shizen-shi Hakubutsukan) was a museum in Sendai, Miyagi Prefecture, Japan.

== History ==
Local magnate Saitō Zenemon founded the Saitō Hō-on Kai or "Saitō Gratitude Foundation" as an academic grant-making body in 1923. Ten years later, the Saitō Hō-on Kai Museum (斎藤報恩会博物館) opened in the Foundation's new headquarters building in Sendai, with Hatai Shinkishi the first director. In 1945, the Museum was badly damaged during the bombing of Sendai, losing its entire botanical collection as well as many documents. The repaired building was finally demolished in 1973 to make way for redevelopment. In 1976, the Museum changed its name to the Saitō Hō-on Kai Museum of Natural History (斎藤報恩会自然史博物館). Due to worsening finances, in 2005 the Museum decided to donate its entire collection to the National Museum of Nature and Science, the transfer of objects taking place the following year. In 2009, the Museum was renamed the Saitō Hō-on Kai Pocket Museum (ポケットミュージアム斎藤報恩会博物館). It finally closed in 2015 and the Foundation was dissolved later the same year.

== Publications ==
- Saito Ho-on Kai Museum of Natural History research bulletin (1977–2015; vols. 45–79)
- Saito Ho-on Kai Museum research bulletin (1934–1976; vols. 1–44)

== See also ==
- Sendai City Museum
