= Marian Scott =

Marian Scott may refer to:

- Marian Dale Scott, Canadian painter
- Marian Scott (statistician), Scottish statistician, author and academic
- Marian Montagu Douglas Scott, paternal grandmother of Sarah, Duchess of York

== See also ==
- Marion Scott (disambiguation)
