= George Leland =

George Leland may refer to:

- Mickey Leland (George Thomas Leland, 1944–1989), anti-poverty activist and later congressman
- George W. Leland (1834–1880), Medal of Honor recipient
- George Adams Leland (1850–1924), American medical doctor and pedagogue
