= Education in the Empire of Japan =

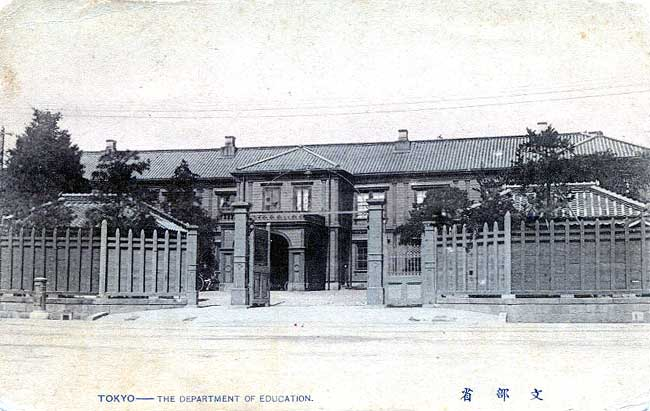
Ministry of Education of Japan, circa 1890

Education in the Empire of Japan was a high priority for its government, as the leadership of the early Meiji government realized the need for universal public education in its drive to modernize the nation.

== Education policy during Meiji era ==
During the Edo period, commoners and outcasts were mostly uneducated. What these low-class people learnt was generally geared towards the basic and practical subjects such as reading, writing, and arithmetic. By the late 1860s, the Meiji leaders had established a system that declared equality in education for all in the process of modernizing the country.

After 1868, new leadership set Japan on a rapid course of modernization. The Meiji leaders established a public education system to modernize the country. Missions like the Iwakura Mission were sent abroad to study the education systems of leading Western countries. They returned with the ideas of decentralization, local school boards, and teacher autonomy. Such ideas and ambitious initial plans, however, proved very difficult to carry out. After some trial and error, a new national education system emerged. As an indication of its success, elementary school enrollments climbed from about 30% percent of the school-age population in the 1870s to more than 90 percent by 1900, despite strong public protest, especially against school fees.

In 1871, the Ministry of Education was established. Elementary school was made compulsory from 1872, and was intended to create loyal subjects of the Emperor. Middle Schools were preparatory schools for students destined to enter one of the Imperial Universities, and the Imperial Universities were intended to create westernized leaders who would be able to direct the modernization of Japan. In December, 1885, the cabinet system of government was established, and Mori Arinori became the first Minister of Education of Japan. Mori, together with Inoue Kowashi created the foundation of the Empire of Japan's educational system by issuing a series of orders from 1886. These laws established an elementary school system, middle school system, normal school system and an imperial university system. With the aid of foreign advisors, such as American educators David Murray and Marion McCarrell Scott, normal schools for teacher education were also created in each prefecture. Other advisors, such as George Adams Leland, were recruited to create specific types of curriculum.

By 1890, Imperial Rescript on Education was signed to articulate government policy on the guiding principles of education on the Empire of Japan. The Imperial Rescript along with highly centralized government control over education, largely guided Japanese education until the end of World War II.

With the increasing industrialization of Japan, demand increased for higher education and vocational training. Inoue Kowashi, who followed Mori as Minister of Education established a state vocational school system, and also promoted women's education through a separate girls' school system.

Compulsory education was extended to six years in 1907. According to the new laws, textbooks could only be issued upon the approval of the Ministry of Education. The curriculum was centered on moral education (mostly aimed at instilling patriotism), mathematics, design, reading and writing, composition, Japanese calligraphy, Japanese history, geography, science, drawing, singing, and physical education. All children of the same age learned each subject from a standardized set of textbooks.

== 1912–1937 ==
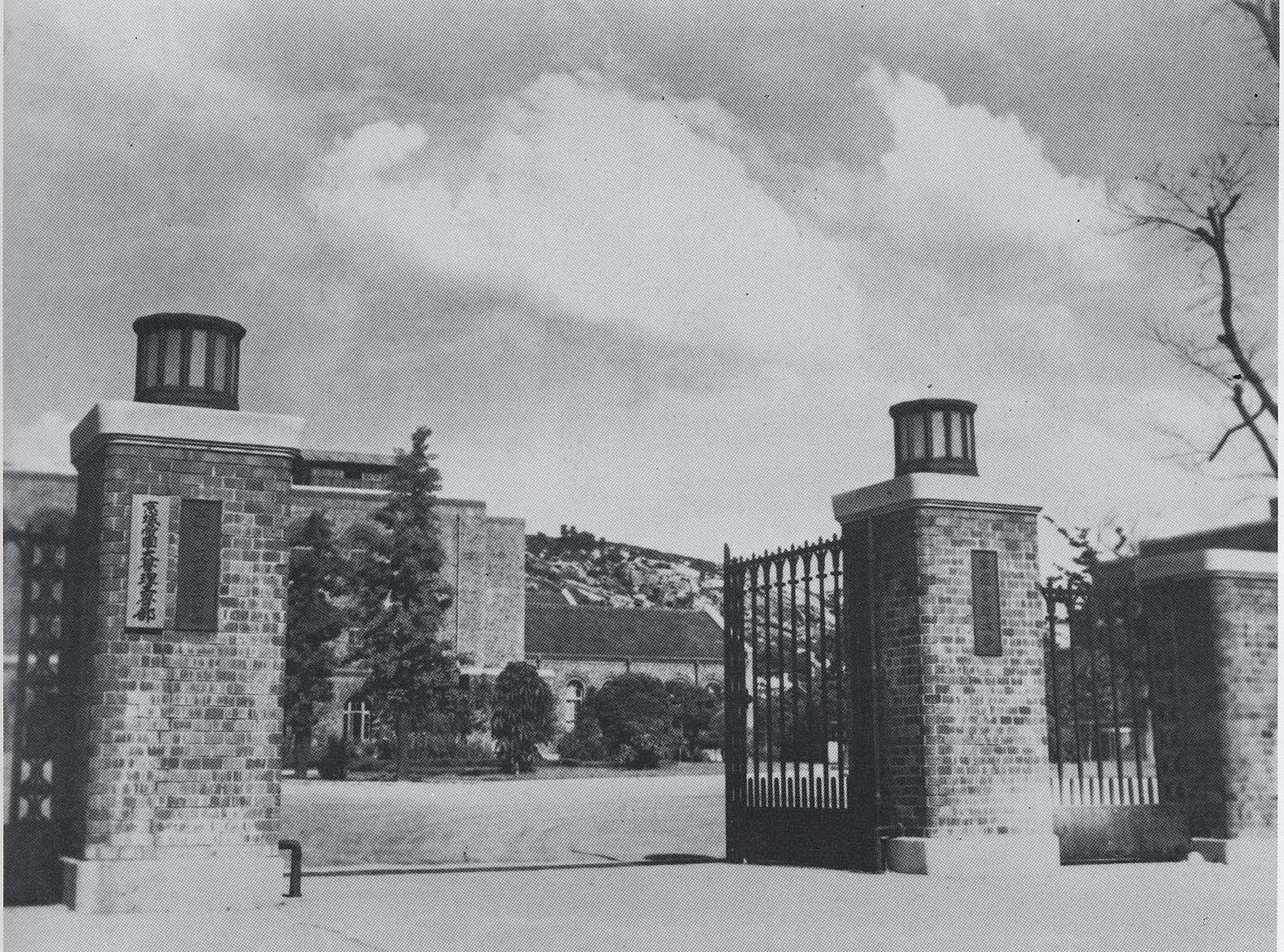
Keijo Imperial University in Seoul, one of the nine Imperial Universities

During the Taishō and early Shōwa periods, from 1912-1937, the education system in Japan became increasingly centralized. From 1917-1919, the government created the Extraordinary Council on Education (臨時教育会議, Rinji Kyōiku Kaigi), which issued numerous reports and recommendations on educational reform. One of the main emphases of the Council was in higher education. Prior to 1918, "university" was synonymous with "imperial university", but as a result of the Council, many private universities obtained officially recognized status. The Council also introduced subsidies for families too poor to afford the tuitions for compulsory education, and also pushed for more emphasis on moral education.

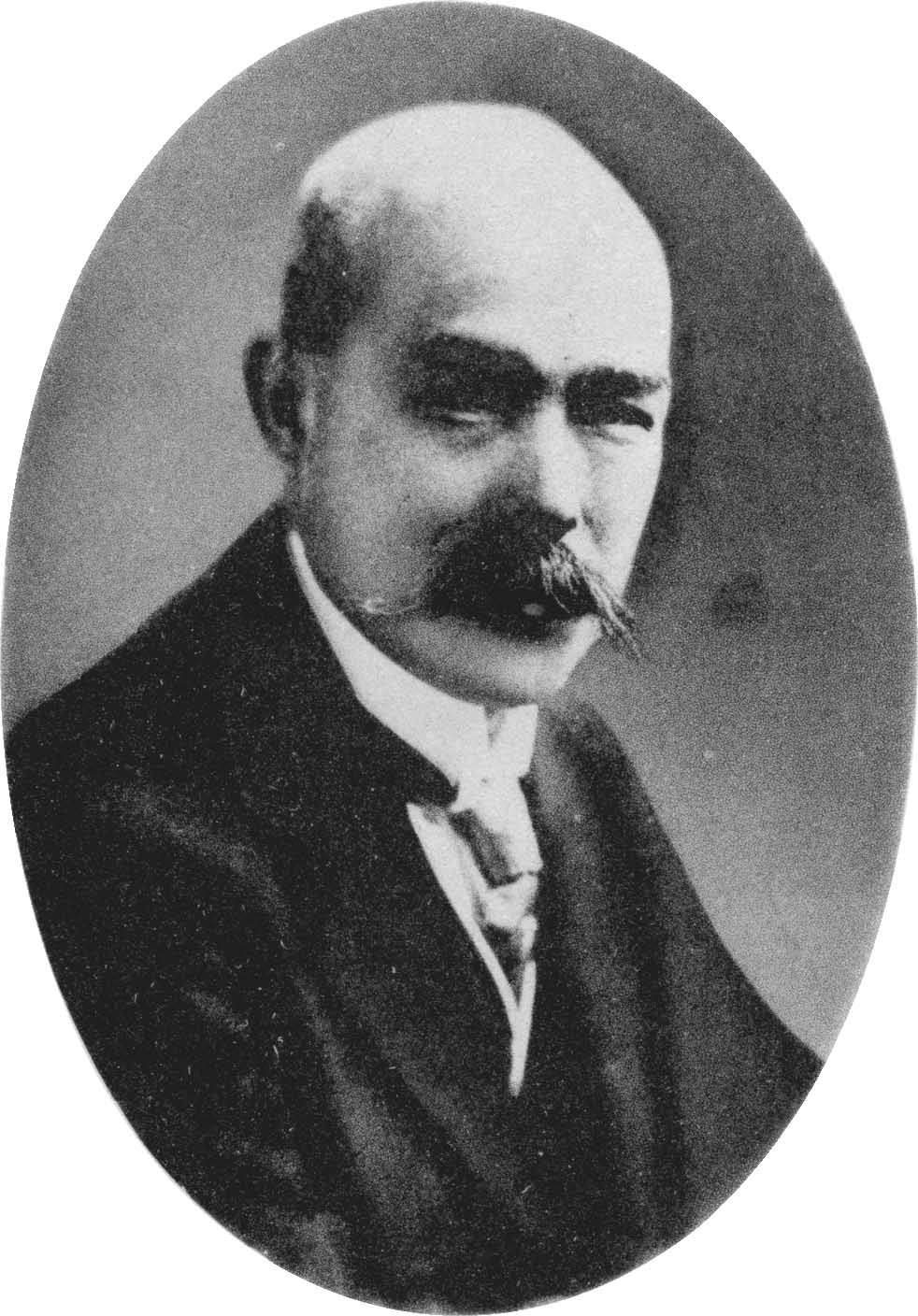
Haruo Hayashi, Dean of the Faculty of Medicine at Tokyo Imperial University

During this period, socialism and communism exerted influences on teachers and teaching methods. The New Educational Movement (新教育運動, Shin Kyōiku Undō) led to teachers unions and student protest movements against the nationalist educational curriculum. The government responded with increased repression, and adding some influences from the German system in an attempt to increase the patriotic spirit and step up the militarization of Japan. The Imperial Rescript to Soldiers and Sailors became compulsory reading for students during this period.

Specialized schools for the blind and for the deaf were established as early as 1878, and were regulated and standardized by the government in the Blind, Deaf and Dumb Schools Order of 1926. Blind people were encouraged toward vocations such as massage, acupuncture, physical therapy, and piano tuning.

== 1937–1945 ==
After the Manchurian Incident of 1931, the curriculum of the national educational system became increasingly nationalistic and after the start of the Second Sino-Japanese War in 1937, the curriculum became increasingly militaristic and was influenced by ultranationalist Education Minister Sadao Araki.

In 1941, elementary schools were renamed National People's Schools (国民学校, Kokumin Gakkō, translated from German Volksschule) and students were required to attend Youth Schools (青年学校, Seinen Gakkō) vocational training schools on graduation, which mixed vocational and basic military training (for boys) and home economics (for girls). The Seinen Gakkō also conducted classes at night for working boys and girls.

Normal schools were renamed Specialized Schools (専門学校, Senmon Gakkō), and were often affiliated with a university. The Senmon Gakkō taught medicine, law, economics, commerce, agricultural science, engineering, or business management. The aim of the Senmon Gakkō was to produce a professional class, rather than intellectual elite. In the pre-war period, all higher school for women were Senmon Gakkō.

After the start of the Pacific War in 1941, nationalistic and militaristic indoctrination were further strengthened. Textbooks such as the Kokutai no Hongi became required to be read. The principal educational objective was teaching the traditional national political values, religion and morality. This had prevailed from the Meiji period. The Japanese state modernized organizationally, but preserved its national idiosyncrasies. Emphasis was laid on the Emperor worship cult, and loyalty to the most important values of the nation, and the importance of ancient military virtues.

After the surrender of Japan in 1945, the United States Education Missions to Japan in 1946 and again in 1950 under the direction of the American occupation authorities abolished the old educational framework and established the foundation of Japan's post-war educational system.

== See also ==
- History of education in Japan
- Educational reform in occupied Japan
- Ho an den
- Imperial Universities
