= Naha City Museum of History =

- 那覇市歴史博物館
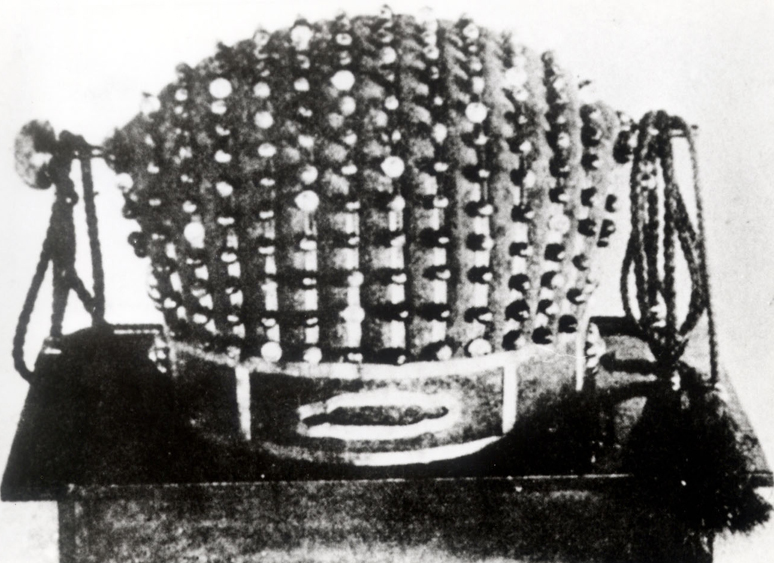
- The hibenkan or Ryūkyū royal crown (NT)

General information
- Location: 4th floor Palette Kumoji, 1-1-1 Kumoji, Naha, Okinawa Prefecture, Japan
- Coordinates: 26°12′50″N 127°40′45″E
- Opened: 8 July 2006

Website
- Official website

Naha City Museum of History (那覇市歴史博物館, Naha-shi Rekishi Hakubutsukan) opened in Naha, Okinawa Prefecture, Japan, in 2006. The collection includes the National Treasure Materials relating to the Shō Family of Ryūkyū Kings. The digital museum was launched in 2014.

== See also ==
- Okinawa Prefectural Museum
- List of Historic Sites of Japan (Okinawa)
- List of Cultural Properties of Japan - historical materials (Okinawa)
- List of Cultural Properties of Japan - writings (Okinawa)
- List of Cultural Properties of Japan - paintings (Okinawa)
- Gusuku Sites and Related Properties of the Kingdom of Ryukyu
