= Marion Scott =

Marion Scott may refer to:

- Marion Scott (musicologist) (1877–1953), English violinist, musicologist and writer
- Marion Scott (model), German-born American model
- Marion duPont Scott (1894–1983), American philanthropist and thoroughbred horsebreeder
- Marion McCarrell Scott (1843–1922), American educator and government advisor in Meiji period Japan
