= List of cultural properties of Japan – archaeological materials (Okinawa) =

This list is of the cultural properties of Japan designated in the category of archaeological materials (考古資料, kōko shiryō) for the Prefecture of Okinawa.

== National Cultural Properties ==
As of 1 January 2015, two Important Cultural Properties have been designated, being of national significance.

Property	Date	Municipality	Ownership	Comments	Image	Coordinates	Ref.
Excavated Artefacts from Sefa-utaki 沖縄県斎場御嶽出土品; Okinawa-ken sēfā utaki shutsudo-hin	Ryukyu Kingdom	Nanjō	Nanjō City (kept at the Nanjō Office of Administration (南城市役所 本庁舎総務課))	562 items, comprising 9 magatama (3 of gold), ten pieces of celadon, 9 gold coins (yoshōsen (厭勝銭), and 534 copper coins (senka (銭貨)); Sefa-utaki is an Historic Site and part of the UNESCO World Heritage Site Gusuku Sites and Related Properties of the Kingdom of Ryukyu		26°08′40″N 127°46′01″E	
Excavated Ceramics from the Site of Shuri Castle 沖縄県首里城京の内跡出土陶磁器; Okinawa-ken Shuri-jō kyō no uchi ato shutsudo tōjiki	First Shō Dynasty	Nishihara	Okinawa Prefecture (kept at the Okinawa Prefectural Centre for Buried Cultural Properties (沖縄県立埋蔵文化財センター)	518 items; Shuri Castle is an Historic Site and part of the UNESCO World Heritage Site Gusuku Sites and Related Properties of the Kingdom of Ryukyu		26°14′36″N 127°45′35″E	

== Prefectural Cultural Properties ==
As of 1 May 2014, two properties have been designated at a prefectural level.

Property	Date	Municipality	Ownership	Comments	Image	Coordinates	Ref.
Excavated Artefacts from Kogachibaru Shell Mound 古我地原貝塚出土品; Kogachibaru kaizuka shutsudo-hin	mid to late-Jōmon	Nishihara	Okinawa Prefecture (kept at the Okinawa Prefectural Centre for Buried Cultural Properties (沖縄県立埋蔵文化財センター)	234 items, comprising 30 pieces of earthenware, 101 stone tools, 58 artefacts made of shell, 39 of bone, and 6 of stone; Kogachibaru Shell Mound is in Uruma City		26°14′36″N 127°45′35″E	
Excavated Artefacts from Shimotabaru Shell Mound 下田原貝塚出土品; Shimotabaru kaizuka shutsudo-hin	c.3800 BP	Nishihara	Okinawa Prefecture (kept at the Okinawa Prefectural Centre for Buried Cultural Properties (沖縄県立埋蔵文化財センター)	209 items, comprising 1 piece of earthenware (and a further 85 fragments), 45 stone tools, 137 artefacts of shell, and 26 of bone; Shimotabaru Shell Mound on Hateruma, Taketomi, is a Prefectural Historic Site		26°14′36″N 127°45′35″E	

== Municipal Cultural Properties ==
As of 1 May 2014, one property has been designated at a municipal level.

Property	Date	Municipality	Ownership	Comments	Image	Coordinates	Ref.
Kaigen Tsuhō Excavated from Sakieda Akazaki Shell Mound 崎枝赤崎貝塚出土開元通宝; Sakieda Akazaki kaizuka shutsudo kaigen tsūhō	Tang dynasty	Ishigaki	Ishigaki City	cast coins		24°20′29″N 124°09′18″E	

== See also ==
- Cultural Properties of Japan
- List of National Treasures of Japan (archaeological materials)
- History of the Ryukyu Islands
- List of Historic Sites of Japan (Okinawa)
- List of Cultural Properties of Japan - historical materials (Okinawa)
