= 2008 Nishihara mayoral election =

Nishihara, Okinawa held a mayoral election on September 7, 2008. Incumbent mayor Seiyu Tarakaki, supported by Liberal Democratic Party and the New Komeito Party, was narrowly defeated by the progressive candidate Akira Uema, supported by all centre, centre-left and left parties.

== Results ==
Mayoral election 2008: Nishihara City
Party	Candidate	Votes	%	±%
Independent, DPJ, JCP, SDP, Social Mass	Akira Uema (上間 明)	8,108		
Independent, LDP, NKP	Seiyu Tarakaki (新垣 正祐)	8,068		
Turnout		14,111	55.96%	

== Sources ==
- Results from JanJan (in Japanese)
- Akahata english edition coverage
