= Bombing of Fukui in World War II =

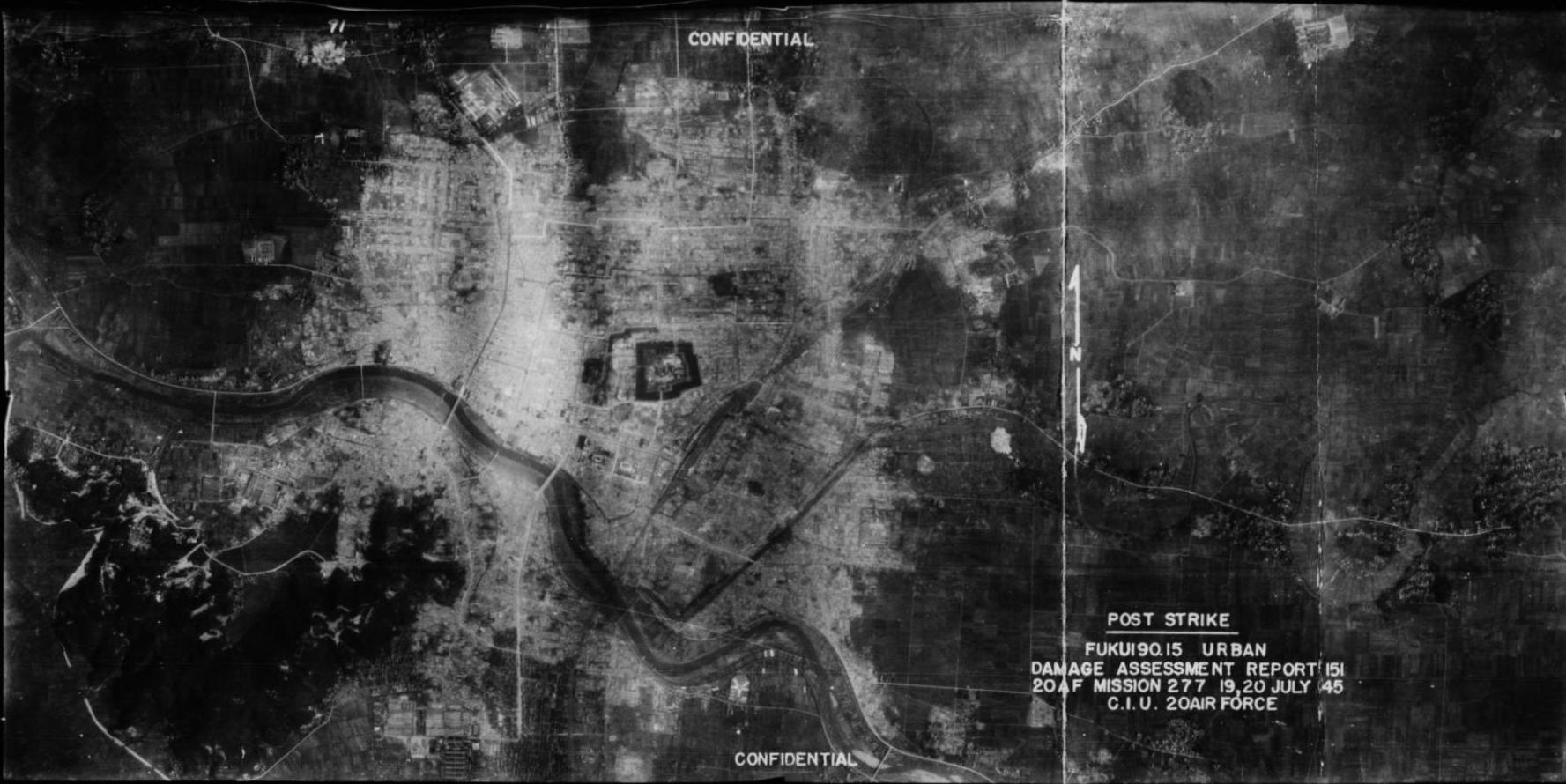
1945 aerial photograph of post-strike Fukui, Japan

The bombing of Fukui (福井空襲, Fukui kūshū) on July 19, 1945, was part of the strategic bombing air raids on Japan campaign waged by the United States against military and civilian targets and population centers during the Japan home islands campaign in the closing stages of the Pacific War.

== Background ==
The city of Fukui lacked major targets of military significance, but was a prefectural capital and regional commercial centre on the Hokuriku Main Line railway. It also housed many small industries which supplied to the Japanese war effort.

== Air raid ==
During early 1945, the USAAF concentrated on bombing targets along the Pacific coastal regions of mainland Japan. The cities in this area were more populous and were more industrialised, and were closer to the American bases in the Mariana Islands. The city of Tsuruga became the first city of the Sea of Japan coast to be targeted by air raids on the night of July 12, 1945. Defences were light to non-existent, and in the bombing, over 70 percent of the city area was razed by incendiary bombs.

The firebombing of Fukui occurred a week later. On July 19, 1945, 133 Boeing B-29 Superfortress bombers launched from Tinian in the Marianas, arriving over Fukui at 2324 PM on a clear, cloudless night. More than 865 tons of incendiary bombs were dropped in a spiral pattern with a radius of 1.2 kilometers around the northwest of the Fukui Castle ruins. The resultant firestorm destroyed most of the city. Fukui civil defense measures were crude at best. Air raid shelters consisted of a hole in the ground next to wooden houses with a wooden roof covered with a thin layer of soil and clay. Many people were burned alive in the firestorm. The estimated civilian casualties in the July 19 raid were 1,576 people killed (915 women and 661 men) with 6,527 injured of whom 107 subsequently died of their wounds. Of the city itself out of 25,691 structures before the bombing, 21,992 were destroyed, rendering most of the surviving populace homeless. A year after the war, the United States Army Air Forces's Strategic Bombing Survey (Pacific War) reported that 84.8 percent of the city had been totally destroyed.

== See also ==
- Air raids on Japan
- Evacuations of civilians in Japan during World War II
- Grave of the Fireflies
- Akiyuki Nosaka
