= Marion McCarrell Scott =

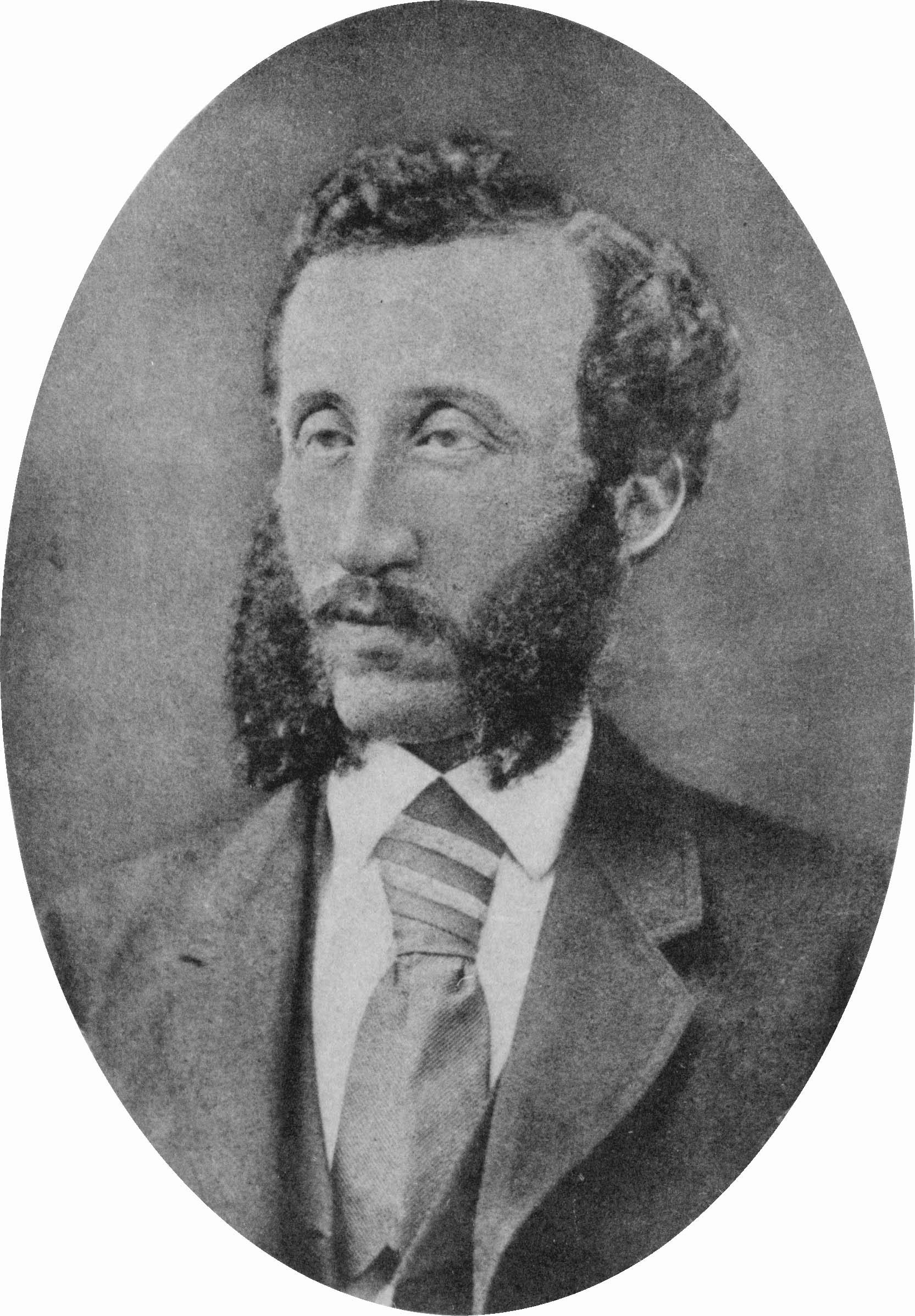
- Marion McCarrell Scott
- Born: August 21, 1843; Barren County, Kentucky, United States
- Died: May 23, 1922 (aged 76); Honolulu, Hawaii, United States
- Occupation: Educator

Marion McCarrell Scott (21 August 1843 - 23 May 1922) was an American educator and government advisor in Meiji period Japan.

== Biography ==
Scott was born in Barren County, Kentucky, and graduated from the University of Virginia during the American Civil War. After the war, he moved to California, where he worked as a teacher, and where he met Mori Arinori, an envoy from the Meiji government of Japan, who offered him a post in Japan as a foreign advisor. Scott arrived in Tokyo in 1871, and taught English language at the Daigaku Nankō, the predecessor to Tokyo Imperial University, and later at Tokyo University of Education, where he developed a training curriculum for Japanese teachers based on western concepts of pedagogy including the theories of Johann Heinrich Pestalozzi. He also worked with the Ministry of Education to develop the state school system which dominated education in the Empire of Japan. After the end of his contract, he departed Japan in 1881. Scott later lived in the Kingdom of Hawaii, where he again worked as a teacher. He maintained his contacts in Japan via the Japanese community in Hawaii.
