= George Adams Leland =

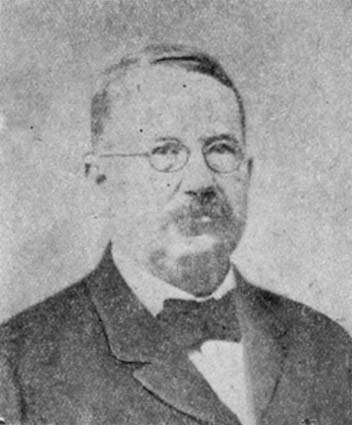
- Born: September 7, 1850; Boston, Massachusetts
- Died: March 17, 1924 (aged 73); Boston, Massachusetts
- Occupations: Doctor, educator

George Adams Leland (7 September 1850 – 17 March 1924) was an American medical doctor and pedagogue, who assisted in the development of the physical education curriculum in Meiji period Japanese education.

== Biography ==
Leland was born in 1850 in Boston, Massachusetts. He attended Amherst College and studied medicine at Harvard Medical School, graduating in 1878. Amherst College had strong ties to the Sapporo Agricultural College in Japan through its connection with Vice Minister for Education Tanaka Fujimaro, who had visited Amherst during the Iwakura Mission and subsequently returned from 1874-1877 for further first-hand research on the American school systems with the aim of modernizing and westernizing education in the Empire of Japan. He approached Amherst president Julius H. Seelye for advice on establishing a curriculum for use in the new state schools being established in Japan. He also visited the Centennial Exposition in Philadelphia, after which he submitted a report to the Japanese government praising the Amherst style of physical education over the more regimented, military-drill style techniques then in use in Japan.

Seeyle recommended Leland, who was subsequently hired as a foreign advisor by the Meiji government, arriving in Japan on September 6, 1878. After touring several schools, he implemented a two-tier training regime at a Physical Education Teaching Centre, with a "heavy course" in gymnastics for athletes, and a "light course" for women and children, involving the use of dumbbells and introducing the sports of croquet, cricket and baseball. His first class of 21 physical education teachers graduated in 1881. Leland's contract was not renewed by the Japanese government for financial reasons, and he departed Japan on July 31, 1881.

Although Leland's teacher education facility was discontinued in April 1886, his theories and techniques were adopted by the Japanese high school system, and continue to be used to this day.

After departing Japan, Leland travelled to Europe, returning to Boston in October 1882, where he established a private medical practice, and also developed the gymnastics program for the YMCA. He became President of the United States Society of Ear-Nose-Throat Specialists in 1912 and professor emeritus at Dartmouth Medical School in 1914 and senior surgeon at Boston City Hospital.

In 1919, Leland was awarded the Order of the Rising Sun, 4th class, by the Japanese government. He died in 1924 in Boston.
