= Hōanden =

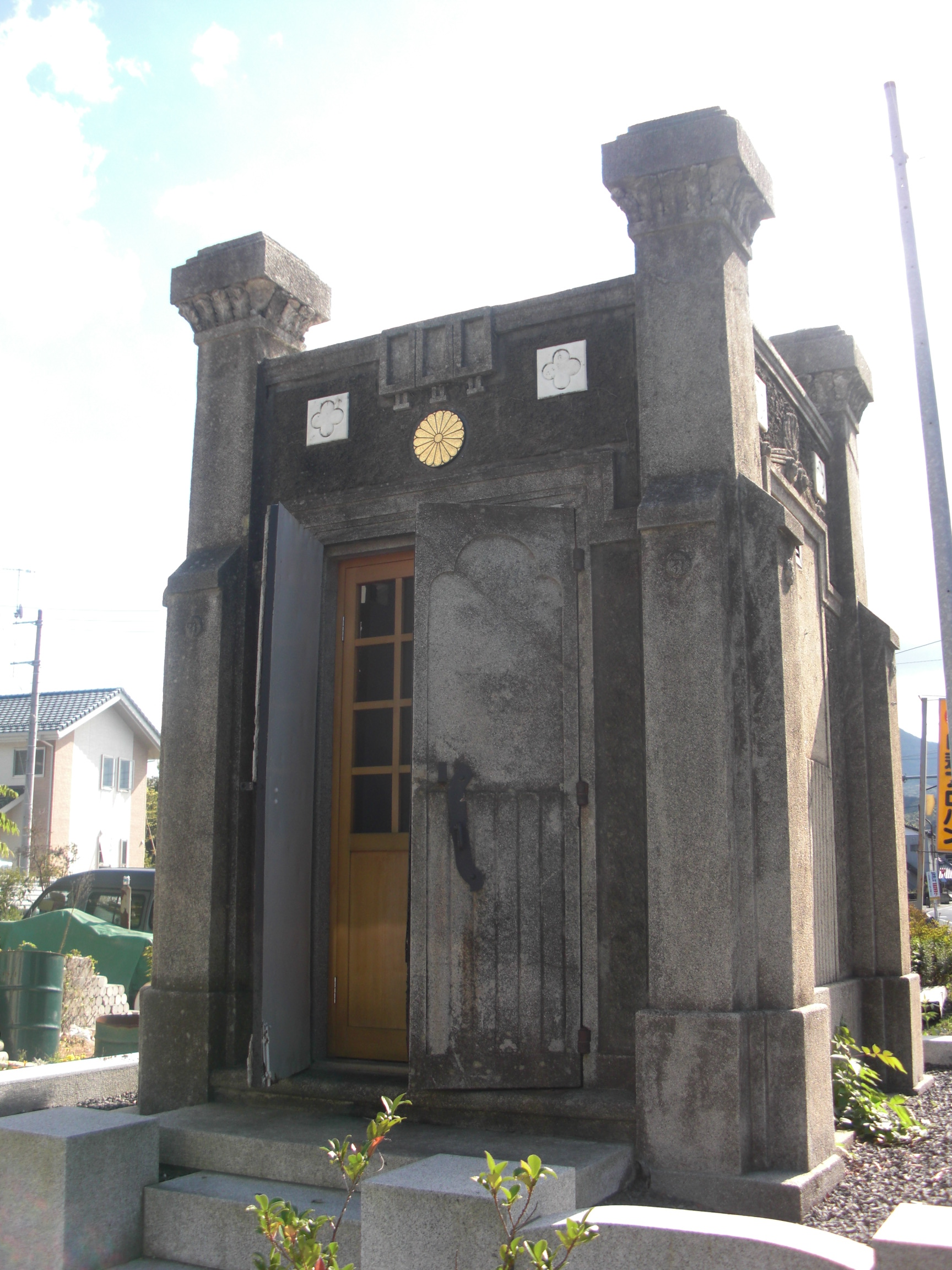
Hō-an-den in a school in Sakuragawa, Ibaraki Prefecture; Greek temple type

In Imperial Japan, between the 1910s and 1945, a Hō-an-den (奉安殿) was a small shrine- or temple-like building that housed a photograph of the incumbent Emperor and Empress (Emperor Meiji, Emperor Taishō, Emperor Shōwa, Empress Shōken, Empress Teimei and Empress Kōjun) together with a copy of the Imperial Rescript on Education. A Hō-an-den was typically installed at elementary schools, though also at a number of other institutions. This served as a place for the veneration of the Emperor of Japan.

== History ==
Dissemination of photographs of the Emperor and Empress of Japan started after the publication of the Imperial Rescript on Education on 30 October 1890. This 315 character document was read aloud at all important school events, and pupils were required to study and memorize the text. On ceremonial days, such as National Foundation Day, the Emperor's Birthday and New Year's Day, it was customary to make a deep, respectful bow to the photograph of the Emperor and Empress. In the Taishō era and Shōwa era before the end of World War II, the birthday of Emperor Meiji, November 3, was an additional day of celebration. On these occasions, the school principal read the Imperial Rescript on Education. All, when passing in front of the Hō-an-den, were required to take a deep bow, correcting their uniforms.

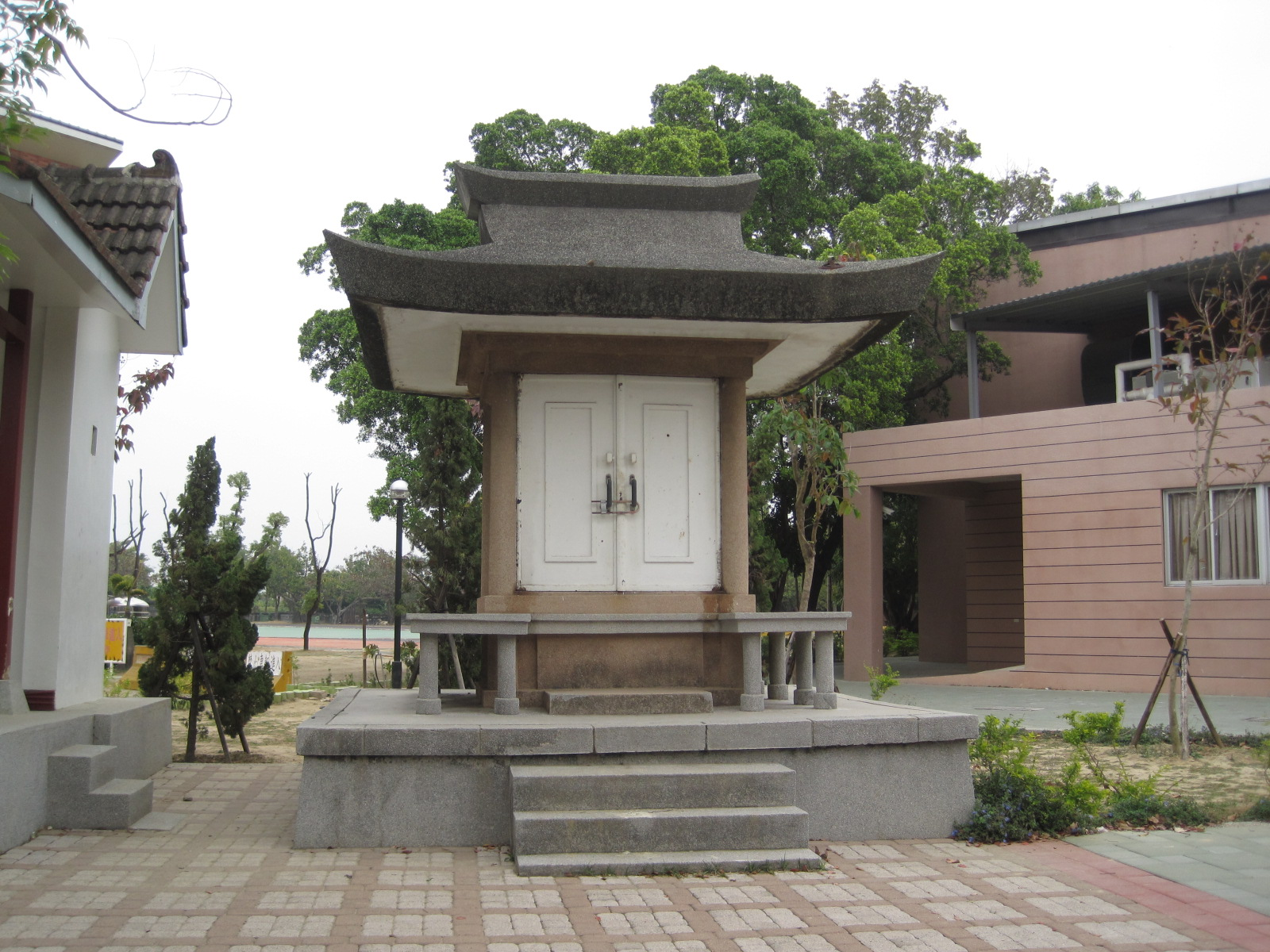
Hō-an-den, previously at Harashinka Elementary school, Tainan, Formosa

== Types ==
Earlier, a Hō-an-sho was established in elementary schools, inside the auditorium or in the teachers' office; inside were placed pictures of the Emperor and Empress together with the Imperial Rescript on Education. However, there were cases of fires which endangered the photographs. In the 1923 Great Kantō earthquake, some photographs burned and principals committed suicide in atonement. As a separate structure, there were various types of Hō-an-den, including a Greek temple-style and Shinto shrine type. In 1933, there was a Hō-an-den competition. In elementary schools, independent small buildings or Hō-an-den were preferred, while in higher schools such as middle schools, a hō-an-ko or safe might be preferred, installed within the existing school buildings.

== Standards ==
The standard Hō-an-den should be built near the principal's office, staff room or duty room, outside the building; the minimum interior space should be 85 cm from the front to the back, 1.5 meter high and 1.2 meter in width; construction should be in reinforced concrete, with walls more than 25 cm thick. The Ho-an-den should be equipped with a safe-type door, and the interior should be resistant to fire and earthquake, with asbestos, and covered inside with wood such as Chamaecyparis obtusa or Paulownia tomentosa. The height of the container for the photograph was to be 50 cm.

== Maintenance ==
The maintenance of the photographs of the Emperor and Empress was the utmost duty of the principal of the schools. There were cases of principals committing suicide when the photograph of the Emperor and Empress was burned. Because of marked humidity within the Ho-an-den, some photographs became stained, and in that case, a written explanation was necessary.

== Other Hō-an-den ==
In the early part of the 1940s, a Ho-an-den was erected inside Tama Zenshoen Sanatorium, a leprosarium.

== Abolition ==
Immediately after the end of World War II, educational reforms were issued by the GHQ, namely the prohibition of the support of National shintoism on November 15 and the return of the photographs of the Emperor and Empress on December 28, and the order of the destruction of the Hō-an-den (on February 18, 1946, in Kumamoto City). Many Hō-an-den were destroyed or buried, while a small number of them were left as they were, and some of them were designated as local war memorials. Because Hō-an-den were so strongly built, Kumamoto city ordered that the roof parts should be completely destroyed and the feeling of sacred places should not be left, and it might be left if it was used for the purpose of warehouses. There were ceremonies when the photographs of the Emperor and the Empress were burned. The copies of the Imperial Rescript on Education, distributed in Kumamoto Prefecture were brought back to the building of the Ministry of Education in September 1948, while the photographs of the Emperor and the Empress were collected and burned in a ceremony on February 2, 1946, at Sekidai Elementary School. In Okinawa, teachers held a burning ceremony of photographs of the Emperor and the Empress. In Miyakojima, Okinawa, it was on August 31, 1945.

== Remnants ==
Some Hō-an-den were transferred to other places such as shrines. A number are now used as memorial monuments to the deceased. Preserved Hō-an-den may be found not only within the current territorial boundaries of Japan, but also in Sakhalin, Taiwan, and Brazil (though not in Manchuria). In Kumamoto Prefecture, five Hō-an-den and one Hō-an-ko (safe-type) have been recorded. Twelve surviving examples have been registered for protection as Tangible Cultural Properties.

== A Table of Hō-An-Den and Hō-An-Ko in Kumamoto Prefecture ==
A Table of Hō-An-Den and Hō-An-ko in Kumamoto Prefecture, as of 2010
Institutions and Place	Year of Construction	Present Status and Remarks
Kuroishibaru Airfield, (Kohshi City)	Around 1941	Concrete building only
Kawakami Elementary School(Kumamoto)	Later than 1929	Concrete building only (Shrine type), transferred to a shrine
Kitasato Elementary School(Aso, Kumamoto)	1931	Shrine-type transferred to a shrine, Present in almost original shape
Shitahata Elementary School(Kohsa, Kumamoto)	1937	Transferred to an individual as memorial of deceased in previous war
Iino Elementary School(Togawa, Mashiki-machi, Kumamoto)	Later than 1930	Rebuilt in 1952 as individual memorial, Photograph received on October 11, 1928
Keitoku Elementary School (Hō-An-Ko) (Kumamoto)	Later than 1929	Built by Ohtani Safe Company, Kyoto,registered as educational heritage of Kumamoto City

== See also ==
- Education in the Empire of Japan
- Ningen-sengen
- Japanization
