= Ishigaki City Yaeyama Museum =

- 石垣市立八重山博物館
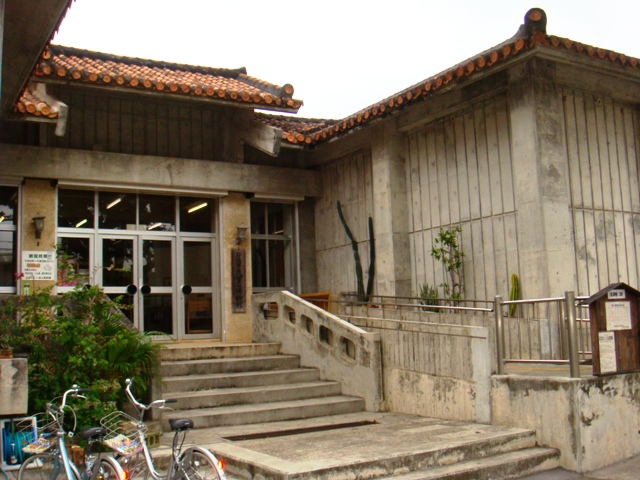

General information
- Location: 4-1 Azatonoshiro, Ishigaki, Okinawa Prefecture, Japan
- Coordinates: 24°20′17″N 124°09′34″E
- Opened: 18 October 1972

Website
- ja

Ishigaki City Yaeyama Museum (石垣市立八重山博物館, Ishigaki shiritsu Yaeyama hakubutsukan) opened in 1972 in Ishigaki, Okinawa Prefecture, Japan. The collection covers the archaeology, history, art, and folk traditions of Ishigaki and the Yaeyama Islands.

== See also ==
- Okinawa Prefectural Museum
- Museums in Okinawa Prefecture
