= University of the Ryukyus =

University in Nishihara, Okinawa, Japan

Coordinates: 26°15′03″N 127°45′54″E

- 琉球大学
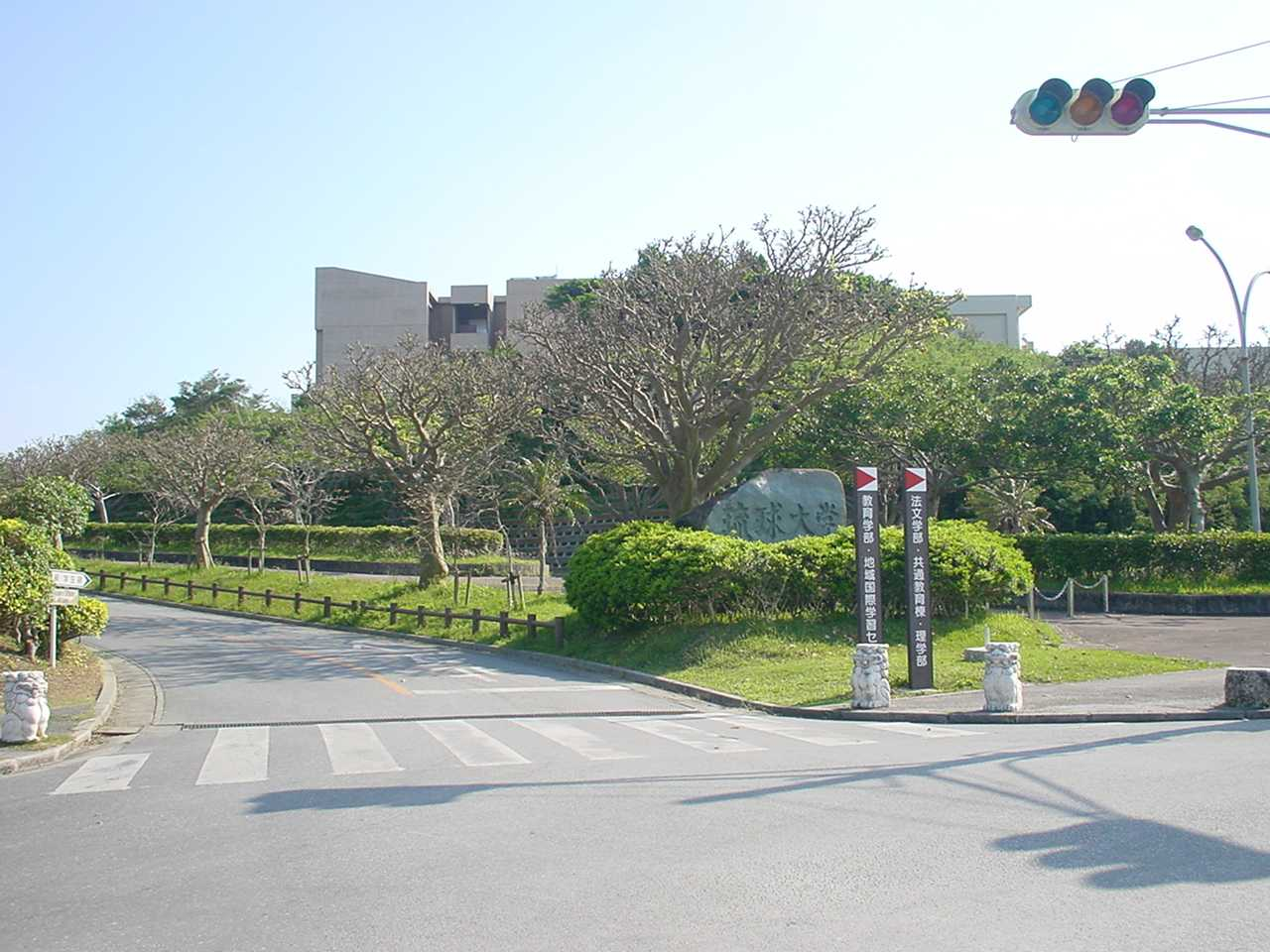
- Type: Public (national)
- Established: May 22, 1950
- Affiliations: ASAIHL
- President: Mutsumi Nishida
- Administrative staff: 1,265
- Students: 8,079
- Undergraduates: 7,140
- Postgraduates: 860
- Doctoral students: 330
- Other students: 8
- Location: Nishihara, Nakagami District, Okinawa Prefecture, Japan
- Campus: Urban
- Website: www.u-ryukyu.ac.jp

The University of the Ryukyus (琉球大学, Ryūkyū Daigaku), abbreviated to Ryūdai (琉大), is a Japanese national university in Nishihara, Okinawa, Japan. Established in 1950, it is the westernmost national university of Japan and the largest public university in Okinawa Prefecture. Located in the Senbaru neighborhood of the town of Nishihara, its campus borders both the village of Nakagusuku and the city of Ginowan.

== History ==
Under the auspices of the United States Civil Administration of the Ryukyu Islands, the University of the Ryukyus was founded as a territorial university on the site of the historic Shuri Castle in Naha on May 22, 1950. It was established under the guidance of Michigan State University. It was placed under the jurisdiction of the Government of the Ryukyu Islands in 1966.

Ryūdai became a Japanese national university on May 15, 1972, upon Okinawa's return to Japan. The university moved to its current campus between 1975 and 1984. The relocation allowed for the restoration of the castle. The university was a state-run university from 1972 until 2004, when it was reclassified as a National University Corporation after the Japanese government made changes to the national university system.

== Relationships ==
Ryūdai has developed its own traditions of contributing to and advancing the position of the local community, of conducting international exchange, and of broadening the knowledge base of the people of Okinawa through academic and educational activities. Since 1988, Ryūdai and the University of Hawaii have had a "sister university" relationship, and have opened up centers for Okinawan studies at both universities. In January 2013, the University of the Ryukyus began a research exchange program with South Korea's Mokpo National University. The University of the Philippines Diliman had noted interest on Ryūdai since 2007 due to its research on underwater cultural landscapes.

== Faculties and graduate schools ==
=== Faculties ===
- Law and Letters
- Education
- Science
- Medicine
- Engineering
- Agriculture

=== Graduate schools ===
- Humanities and Social Sciences
- Education
- Medicine
- Health Sciences
- Engineering and Science
- Agriculture
- Law school

== Inter-department institutes ==
- Center of Molecular Biosciences
- Center for Cooperative Research
- Instrumental Research Center
- Education and Research Center for Lifelong Learning
- Computing and Networking Center

== Facilities for education and research ==
- Center for Educational Research and Development
- The Institute for Animal Experiments
- Manufacturing Laboratory
- Subtropical Field Science Center
- Educational and Clinical Center for Children with Disabilities
- Research Laboratory Center
- Joint-Use Inter-Department Institutes
- Low Temperature Center
- University Evaluation Center
- Radioisotope Laboratory
- University Education Center
- Center for Asia-Pacific Island Studies
- Language Center
- Environmental Science Center

== International programs ==
Sister-School Programs

- Partner Universities...71
- Departmental Exchange Agreements...43

Student Exchanges with Partner Universities

- Inbound...79
- Outbound...33

Research Exchange

- Outbound researchers...595
- Inbound researchers...203

International Students

- Undergraduates...53
- Graduate...135
- Auditing...23
- Research...10
- Special Auditing...71
- Special Research...4

=== The Fujukan Museum ===
The Fujukan (風樹館) is the university's main museum. Its collection includes biological specimens from around the Ryukyus, artifacts from Shuri Castle, traditional farming tools, local crafts, folk toys, and geological samples. Some of the objects are catalogued digitally in an online database. It does not charge admission fees.

The University Museum is a successor of the Museum of Agriculture – likewise called Fujukan – founded in 1967 on the former (Shuri) campus. The current museum was built in 1985 and was known as the "Academic Museum" ((琉球大学)資料館; lit. ‘repository for [academic] resources/documents’) until 2015, when it was renamed the "University Museum" ((琉球大学)博物館).

== Athletics ==
=== American football ===
Ryukyus has an American football team that competes in the Kyūshū Collegiate American Football Association.
