= Bombing of Sendai in World War II =

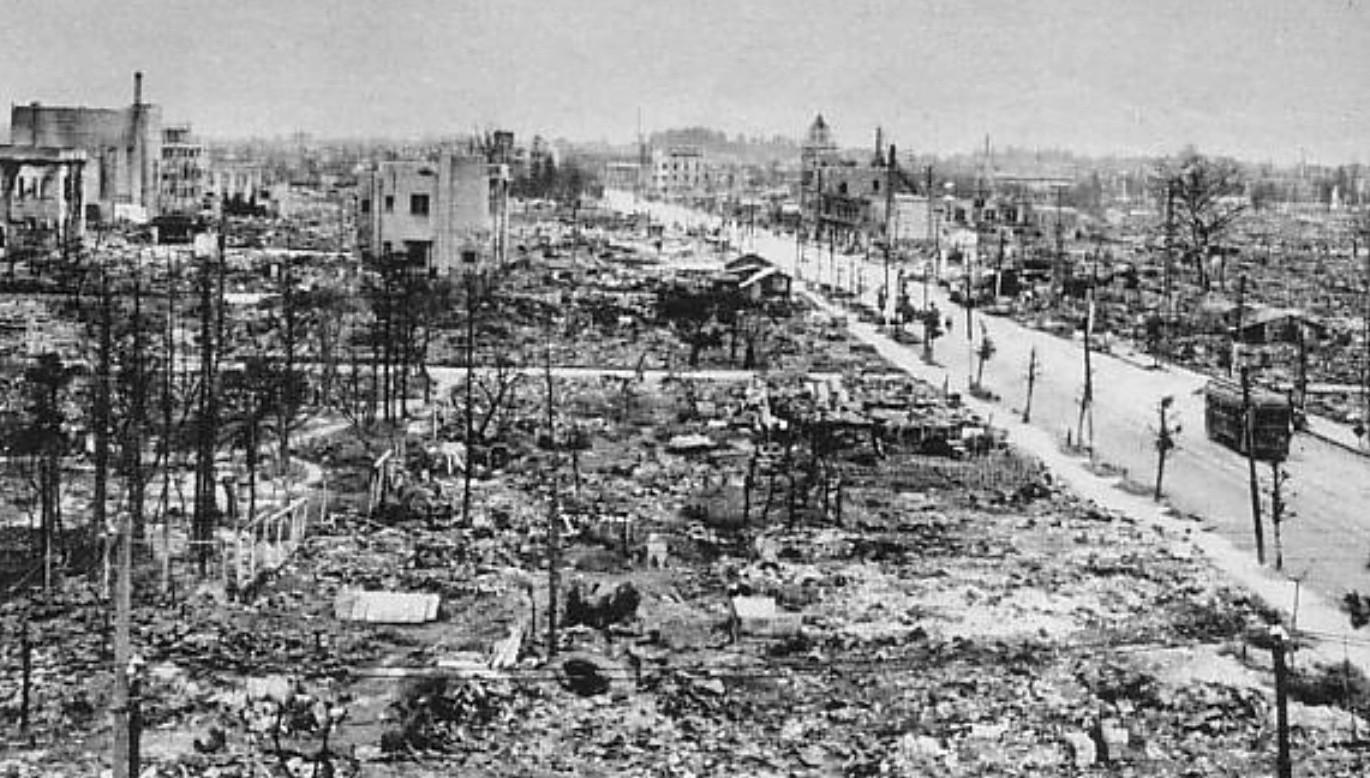
Sendai after the 1945 air raid

The bombing of Sendai (仙台空襲, Sendai-kūshū) on July 10, 1945, was part of the strategic bombing campaign waged by the United States against the civilian population and military targets during the Japan home islands campaign in the closing stages of the Pacific War in 1945.

== Background ==
The city of Sendai was the largest population and commercial center of the Tohoku region of northern Honshu island, but lacked specific targets of strategic military significance. The Tōhoku Main Line railway connecting Tokyo with Aomori also ran through the city.

The industrial city of Kamaishi was bombed on July 14, 1945, which was also the first air raid experienced in Miyagi Prefecture during the war. The first experience of Sendai with bombing was on March 10, 1945, when three B-29 Superfortress bombers from the Tokyo Air Raid dropped their bomb load on Mount Zaō for unknown reasons, killing 34 civilians, and an additional two B-29 bombers attacked Sendai Airport causing minor damage.

On May 25, 1945, a photo-reconnaissance B-29 overflew Sendai at an altitude of 8000 feet, compiling a detailed map of the downtown area of the city. On July 10, 1945, another B-29 made an over flight of Sendai, this time dropping propaganda leaflets warning the residents of the city of its imminent destruction.

== The air raid ==
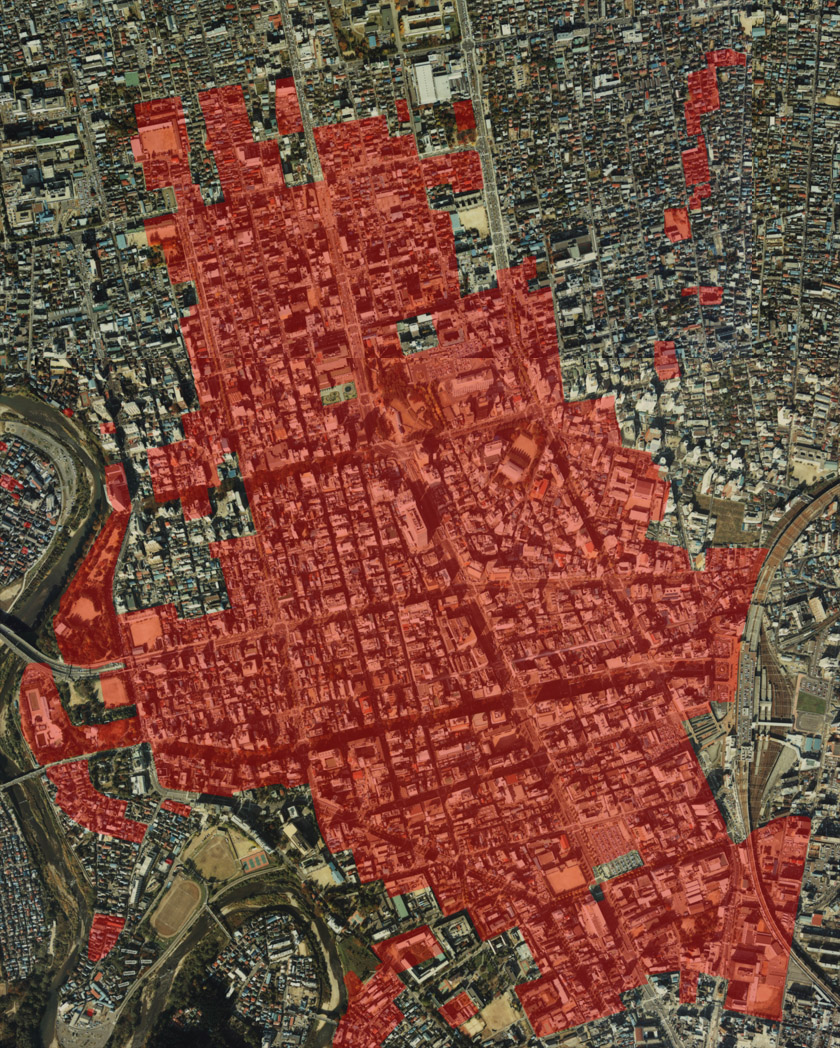
Area destroyed by the Sendai Air Raid

On July 9, 1945, 131 B-29 bombers from the USAAF 58th Bombardment Wing launched from Tinian island in the Marianas. Several aircraft turned back due to mechanical problems, and 123 aircraft arrived over the target at an altitude of 10,000 feet at just after midnight in the early morning of July 10, 1945. The bombers split into 25 groups of between two and five aircraft each to carpet bomb the densely packed residential center of the city with 10,961 incendiary bombs. The resultant firestorm destroyed most of the historic center of city. A five square kilometer portion of the center of the city was destroyed, with 11,933 residences burned (approximately 23% of the city). Also lost in the bombing were a number of cultural treasures, include the structures of Sendai Castle, and the Zuihoden mausoleum of Date Masamune. On the other hand, the large Sendai Arsenal, and the structures of the IJA 2nd Division were untouched by the air raid.

According to a survey report compiled by the Defense Division of Sendai City Hall during July, there were 987 dead, 50 missing, 260 seriously injured and 1423 mildly injured. Victim lists were compiled in two books written in 1973 and 1995. The second calculated that 1064 people were killed by the air raid, and 335 more were thought to have been killed, including unidentified and missing persons. These numbers include people killed in all raids on Sendai during the war.

During the air raid, the only American loss was a B-29 destroyed in a crash on the runway at Tinian (its crew escaped without injury). A year after the war, the United States Army Air Forces's Strategic Bombing Survey (Pacific War) reported that 21.9 percent of the city had been destroyed.

Sendai experienced a number of minor air raids afterwards. On July 12, a single B-29 dropped 36 incendiary bombs on a Sendai suburb. On July 13, July 25, August 9 and August 10, the city and airport were bombed and strafed by United States Navy carrier-based aircraft.

== See also ==
- Air raids on Japan
- Evacuations of civilians in Japan during World War II
- Grave of the Fireflies (short story), a semi-autobiographical short story set during the bombing
