= Nishihara, Okinawa =

Nishihara 西原町
- Town
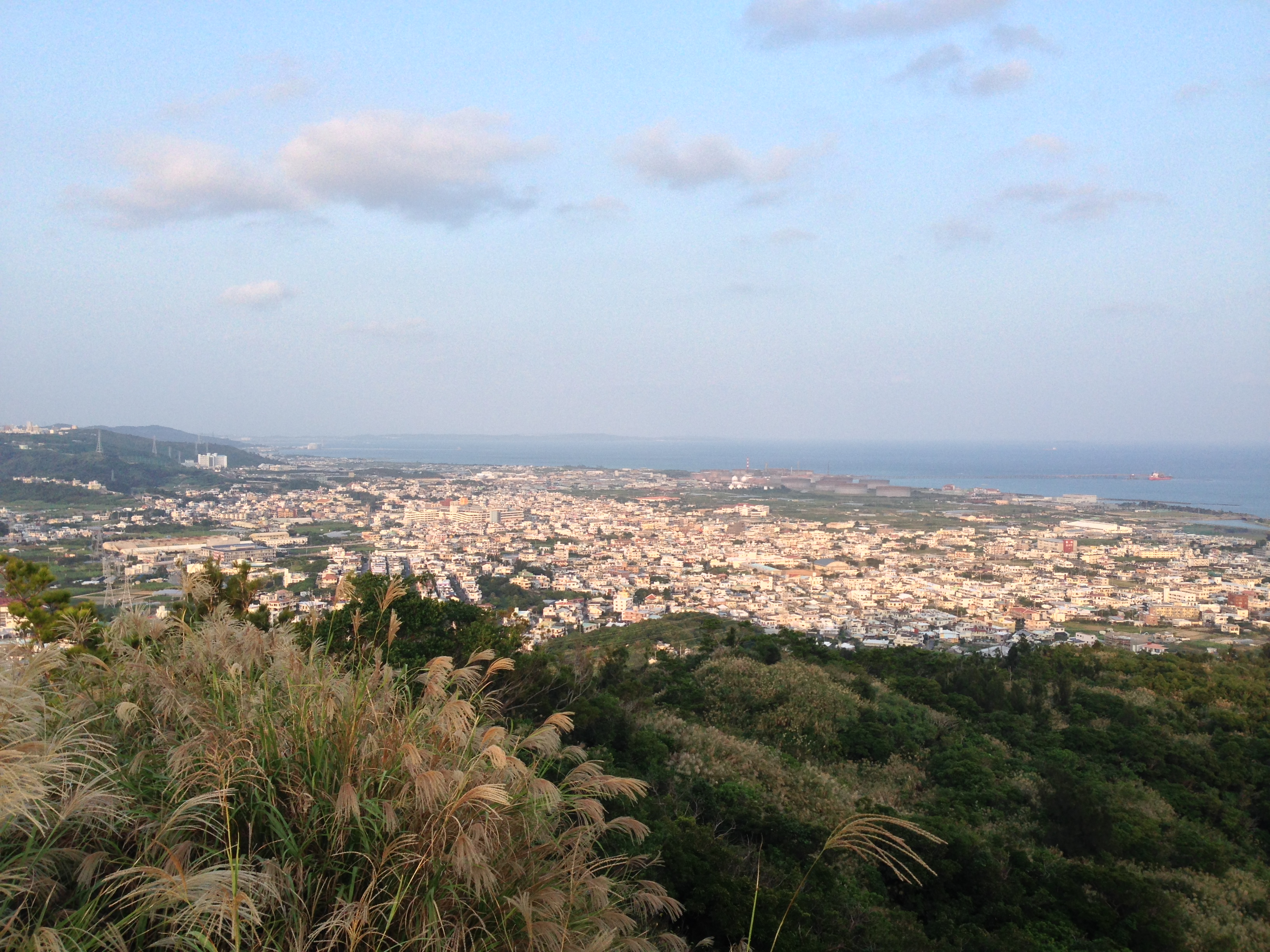
- Nishihara town from Untama-Mui Mt.

- Flag Seal

- Location of Nishihara in Okinawa Prefecture

- Location in Japan
- Coordinates: 26°13′00″N 127°46′00″E
- Country: Japan
- Region: Kyushu
- Prefecture: Okinawa Prefecture
- District: Nakagami

Area
  - Total: 15.84 km^{2} (6.12 sq mi)

Population (October 2016)
  - Total: 34,463
  - Density: 2,176/km^{2} (5,635/sq mi)
- Time zone: UTC+09:00 (JST)
- City hall address: 112 Aza Kadekaru, Nishihara-cho, Nakagami-gun; 903-0220
- Website: www.town.nishihara.okinawa.jp in Japanese
- Symbols
- Flower: Bougainvillea
- Tree: Banyan

Nishihara (西原町, Nishihara-chō; Okinawan: ニシバル, romanized: Nishibaru) is a town located in Nakagami District, Okinawa Prefecture, Japan. In the Okinawan language, nishi means "north" (in Japanese, however, it means "west"), as Nishihara was north of the historical Ryukyuan capital of Shuri.

As of October 2016, the town had an estimated population of 34,463 and a density of 2,200 persons per km^{2}. The total area is 15.84 square kilometres (6.12 mi^{2}).

Situated 10 kilometres (6.2 mi) northeast of the city hall of Naha, Nishihara is surrounded by the cities, towns, and villages of Naha, Urasoe, Ginowan, Haebaru, Yonabaru, and Nakagusuku.

Because both the University of the Ryukyus and the Okinawa Christian Junior College are located in Nishihara, and the Okinawa International University is located nearby, Nishihara's municipal slogan is "Education Town".

== Geography ==
The north, west, and south of Nishihara are hilly; these areas give way to the low-lying coast in the east of the town.

The highest point in Nishihara is Untamamo (158 metres (518 ft)). The low-lying peak, also known as Untamamui in the Okinawan language, sits to the south of the town on the border of Nishihara and the neighboring town of Urasoe. Due to its pyramidal shape, the peak is sometimes known as the "Nishihara Fuji" for its resemblance to Mount Fuji. Untamamo has utaki, or places sacred to the Okinawan religion, on both the north and south sides of the peak. Untamamo was the site of fierce fighting during the Battle of Okinawa in World War II; the spontaneous combustion of unexploded ordnance caused numerous mountain fires in the post-war period.

=== Administrative divisions ===
The town includes twenty-two wards.

- Agarisaki (東崎)
- Amuro (安室)
- Gaja (我謝)
- Goya (呉屋)
- Ikeda (池田)
- Kadekaru (嘉手苅)
- Kakeboku (掛保久)
- Kaneku (兼久)
- Kobashigawa (小橋川)
- Kōchi (幸地)
- Kohatsu (小波津)
- Morikawa (森川)
- Onaga (翁長)
- Onaha (小那覇)
- Senbaru (千原)
- Tanabaru (棚原)
- Tōbaru (桃原)
- Tokusada (徳佐田)
- Tsuhanaha (津花波)
- Uchima (内間)
- Uehara (上原)
- Yonagusuku (与那城)

=== Neighboring municipalities ===
- Ginowan
- Haebaru
- Naha
- Nakagusuku
- Urasoe
- Yonabaru

== History ==
Nishihara was part of the Nishibaru magiri, one of the magiri, or administrative units created prior to the establishment of the Ryukyu Kingdom. The magiri was administered from the former village of Kōchi; in a later period the administrative center was located in the former village of Unaga.

Nishihara flourished as a center of sugar manufacturing at the beginning of the 20th century. The Japanese government promoted the construction of sugar refineries in the village. In 1944 the Imperial Japanese Army built a military airstrip in the Onaha district of Nishihara; the area was bombed by the United States on October 10 of the same year, causing extensive damage to Onaha. It was near the village of Nishihara that the U.S. 1st Marine Division reached its initial invasion objective on April 4, 1945, during the Battle of Okinawa. The entirety of Nishihara was destroyed as a front line in the battle, and its residents fled to the north and south of Okinawa Island. However, 47% of the population of Nishihara was ultimately killed during World War II.

The Gaja district of Nishihara was the center of initial post-war reconstruction. Rice was planted immediately after the war, but this was soon replaced by the sugarcane cultivation of the prewar period. Nishihara saw the development of business enterprises and residential land development in the mid-1960s; by 1979 the population of Nishihara had increased to the point that the village was elevated to town status. The urbanization of the town continues due to the presence of university facilities and residential developments.

== Cultural and natural assets ==
Nishihara Town hosts forty-six cultural properties and monuments, most of which appear on municipal listings but are not officially designated or registered at the national, prefectural or municipal level.

- Name (Japanese) (Type of registration)

=== Cultural Properties ===
- Certification from Tanabaru Village in Nishihara Magiri addressed to Ida Pēchin (西原間切棚原村から伊田親雲上宛の板証書) (Municipal)
- Chichinta Gusuku (チチンタ(津記武多)グスク)
- Funjurū letters incinerator of Onaga (翁長の焚字炉)
- Gaja Site (我謝遺跡)
- Higa Family's Tūtīkū Praying Site in Tanabaru (棚原比嘉家の土帝君)
- Ikkan-gā well (一貫ガー)
- Ishi Gusuku (イシグスク)
- Jīma-nu-ukā sacred well (ジーマヌウカー)
- Kamuiyaki pot from Uchima No.1 Artefact Scatter (西原町内間散布地No.1出土のカムィ焼) (Municipal)
- Kayabuchi Udun Praying Site (カヤブチウドゥン)
- Kōchi Aji's Tomb (幸地按司墓)
- Kōchi Gusuku (幸地グスク)
- Kōchi's Kukuji-mui forest (幸地の刻時森 (ククジムイ))
- Kohatsu's Ii-nu-yama Sacred Site (小波津の上ヌ嶽)
- Kohatsu's Shicha-nu-taki Sacred Site (小波津の下ヌ嶽)
- Kunkunshi musical score by Yakabi Chōki (屋嘉比朝寄作 工工四) (Prefectural)
- Nakō-mō Praying Site (ナコーモー (名幸毛))
- Nishihara Nakayama Family Documents (西原中山家文書) (Municipal)
- Nishihara's War Memorial (西原の塔)
- Nsuhajii reef (ンスハジー)
- Onaga Hījā-gā Spring (翁長のヒージャーガー)
- Sēguchijō Sacred Site (セーグチジョー)
- Stele of the Former King's Old Residence (先王旧宅碑)
- Stone lion of Goya (呉屋の石獅子)
- Stone lions of Tōbaru (桃原の石獅子)
- Stone stele with 致和 inscription (「致和」の石碑)
- Sukemasu Ōshiro's Memorial (故大城助素之碑)
- Survey Stones (ハル石)
- Tanabaru Gusuku (棚原グスク)
- Tanabaru Noro Dunchi (priestess' residence) (棚原ノロ殿内)
- Tanabaru Shell Mound (棚原貝塚)
- Teranokoshi Noro-gā spring (テラノコシノロガー)
- Tirasa-gā spring (ティラサガー)
- Tōfugwā-bira Hill (トーフグヮービラ)
- Uē-gā spring (親川)
- Ufunmi Utaki Sacred Site (ウフンミウタキ)
- Untamamui (運玉森)
- Urasoe Family's copy of Ise Monogatari (浦添家本伊勢物語) (Prefectural)
- Yonagusuku Shell Mound (与那城貝塚)
- Yubushi-gā Well (ユブシガー)

=== Historic Sites ===
- Former Miyazato Residence in Tanabaru (棚原旧宮里家屋敷跡) (Municipal)
- Former Nishihara Village Office air-raid shelter (旧西原村役場壕) (Municipal)
- Stone wall with bullet marks in Kohatsu (小波津弾痕の残る石塀) (Municipal)
- Tanabaru Paved Road (棚原の石畳道) (Municipal)
- Uchima Udun (内間御殿) (National)

=== Natural Monuments ===
- Uchima Udun's powder-puff tree (内間御殿のサワフジ) (Municipal)

== Education ==
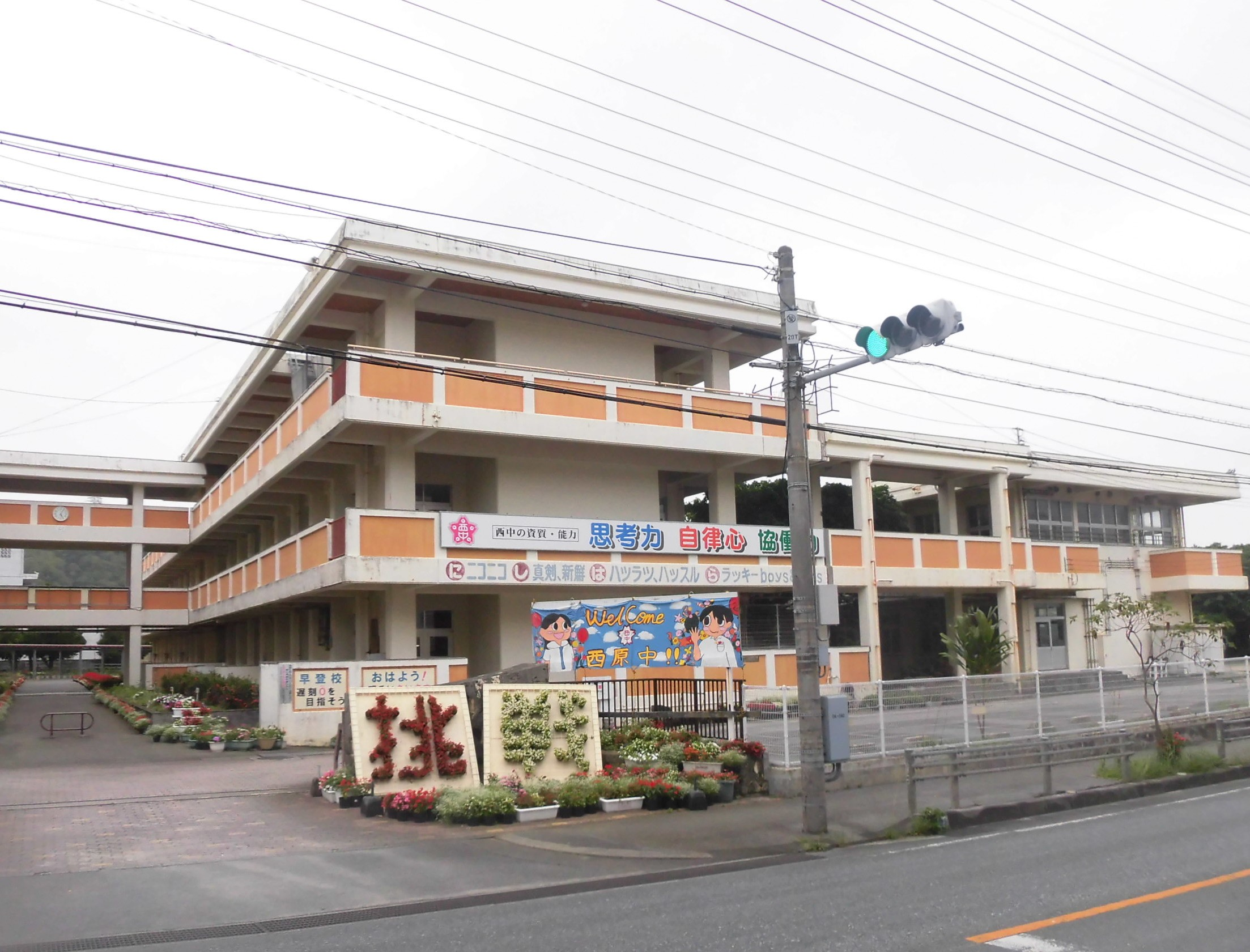
Nishihara Junior High School (西原中学校)

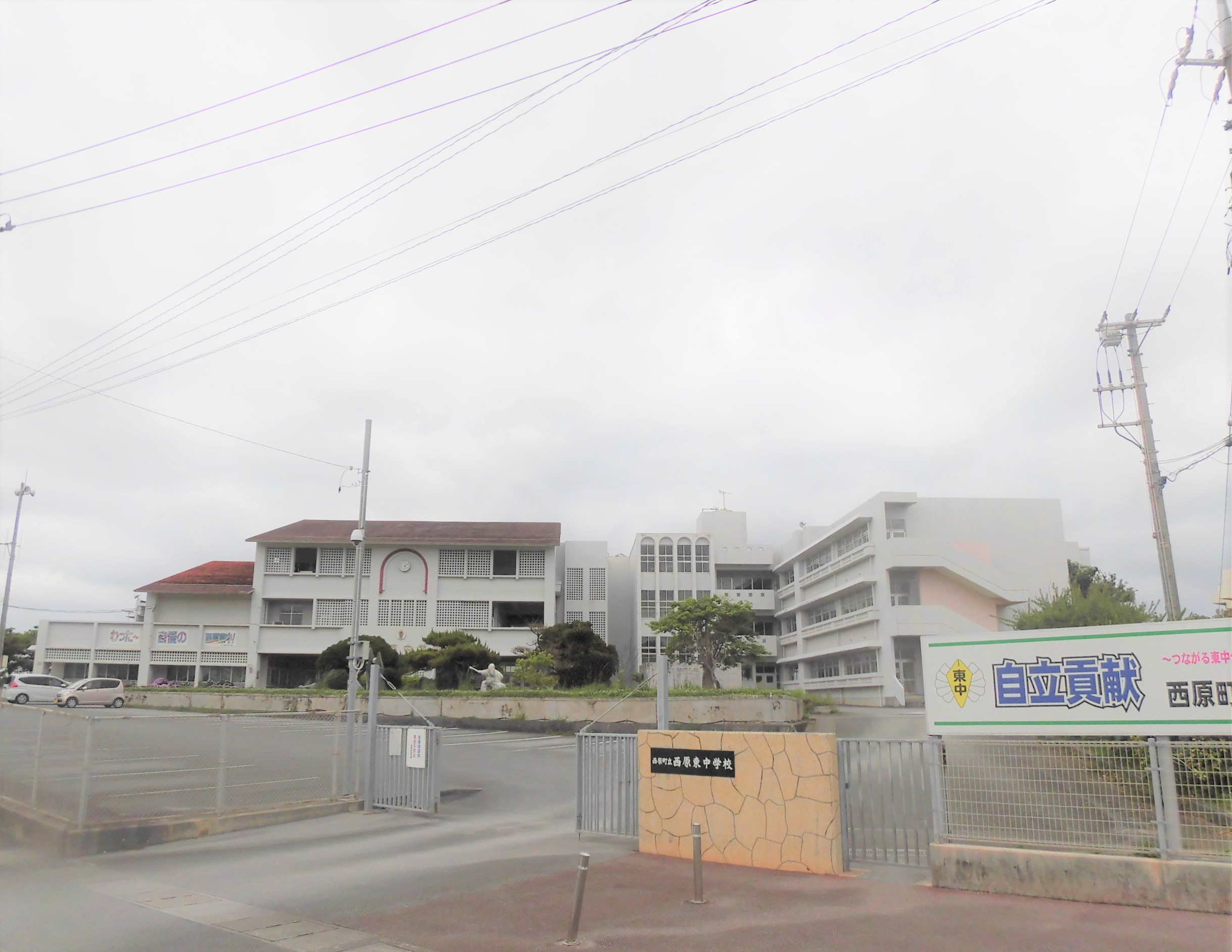
Nishihara Higashi Junior High School (西原東中学校)

Municipal schools:

- Nishihara Elementary School (西原小学校)
- Nishihara Higashi Elementary School (西原東小学校)
- Nishihara Higashi Junior High School (西原東中学校)
- Nishihara Junior High School (西原中学校)
- Nishihara Minami Elementary School (西原南小学校)
- Sakata Elementary School (坂田小学校)

There is also a nationally controlled elementary school, Elementary School Attached to the College of Education, University of the Ryukyus (琉球大学教育学部附属小学校).

== Notable people from Nishihara ==
- Yanis Meziane, French middle-distance runner
- Hohan Sōken, Okinawan martial arts
- Koichi Taira, politician

== See also ==
- 2008 Nishihara mayoral election
