= Ryukyuans =

Ethnic group indigenous to the Ryukyu Islands

琉球民族
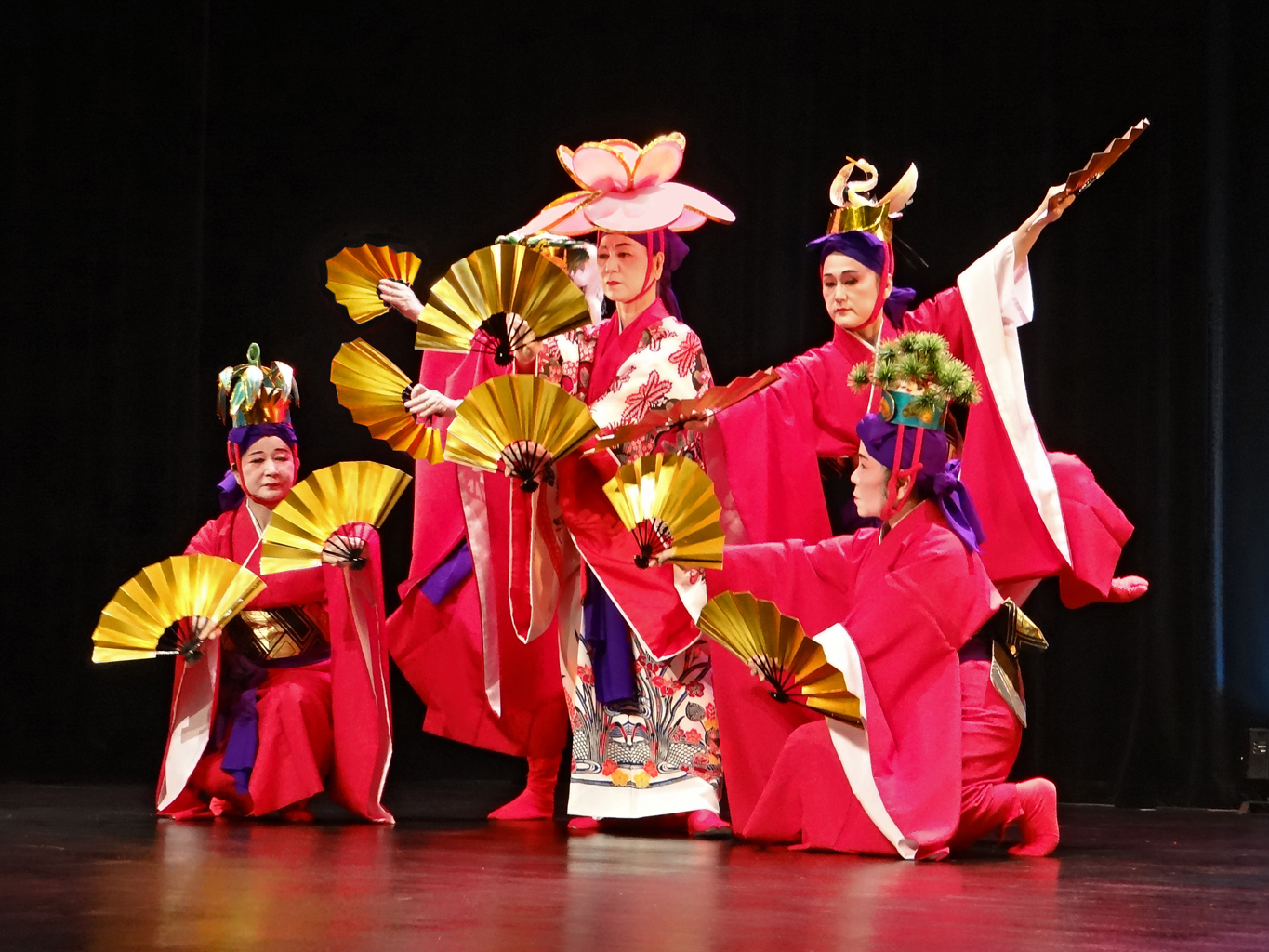
- Ryukyuan dancers in ceremonial attire

Regions with significant populations
- Okinawa Prefecture: 1.4 million
- Kagoshima Prefecture: 118,773 (Note: Only the population of the Satsunan Islands are included in this figure.)
- Osaka Prefecture: 70,000
- Kanagawa Prefecture: 45,000
- Hyōgo Prefecture: 12,000
- Rest of mainland Japan: 173,000
- Outside of Japan: 415,361

Languages
- Ryukyuan languages; Okinawan Japanese; Amami Japanese; Koniya Sign Language

Religion
- Ryukyuan religion; Shinto; Buddhism; Christianity

Related ethnic groups
- Yamato, Yayoi, Jōmon, Ainu

The Ryukyuans (Note: Japanese: 琉球民族, Hepburn: Ryūkyū minzoku; Okinawan: Ruuchuu minzuku / Duuchuu minzuku) are a Japonic-speaking East Asian ethnic group indigenous to the Ryukyu Islands, which stretch from the island of Kyushu to the island of Taiwan. In Japan, most Ryukyuans live in Okinawa Prefecture or Kagoshima Prefecture. They speak the Ryukyuan languages, one of the branches of the Japonic language family along with the Japanese language and its dialects.

The United Nations Human Rights Committee in 2008 recommended that Japan, "should expressly recognize the Ainu and Ryukyu/Okinawa as indigenous peoples in domestic legislation, adopt special measures to protect, preserve, and promote their cultural heritage and traditional way of life, and recognize their land rights". The Japanese government has not accepted this recommendation. Multiple Okinawan municipal assemblies have also passed resolutions protesting the UN recommendation and rejecting the "indigenous" label. The Association of Indigenous People in the Ryukyus (AIPR) has commented that for the Japanese government to recognise "the Ryukyuan as Indigenous Peoples [would require Japan] to adhere to international law, thus prohibiting military bases on [Ryukyuan] land".

Ryukyuans are not a recognized minority group in Japan, as Japanese authorities consider them a subgroup of the Japanese people, akin to the Yamato people. Although officially unrecognized, Ryukyuans constitute the largest ethnolinguistic minority group in Japan, with more than 1.4 million living in Okinawa Prefecture alone. Ryukyuans inhabit the Amami Islands of Kagoshima Prefecture as well, and have contributed to a considerable Ryukyuan diaspora.

Ryukyuans have a distinct culture with some matriarchal elements, an indigenous religion and a cuisine where rice was introduced fairly late (12th century). The population lived on the islands in isolation for many centuries. In the 14th century, three separate Okinawan political polities merged into the Ryukyu Kingdom (1429–1872), which continued the maritime trade and tributary relations started in 1372 with Ming China. In 1609, the Satsuma Domain (based in Kyushu) invaded the Ryukyu Kingdom. The Kingdom maintained a fictive independence in vassal status, in a dual subordinate status to both China and Japan, because Tokugawa Japan was prohibited to trade (directly) with China.

During the Japanese Meiji era, the kingdom became the Ryukyu Domain (1872–1879) after its political annexation by the Empire of Japan. In 1879, the Ryukyu Domain was abolished, and the territory was reorganized as Okinawa Prefecture, with the last king (Shō Tai) forcibly exiled to Tokyo. China renounced its claims to the islands in 1895. During this period, the Meiji government, which sought to assimilate the Ryukyuans as Japanese (Yamato), suppressed Ryukyuan ethnic identity, tradition, culture, and language. After World War II, the Ryūkyū Islands were occupied by the United States between 1945 and 1950 and then from 1950 to 1972. Since the end of World War II, many Ryukyuans have expressed strong resentment against the extensive U.S. military facilities stationed in Okinawa and Tokyo's handling of related issues.

United Nations special rapporteur on discrimination and racism Doudou Diène, in his 2006 report, noted a perceptible level of discrimination and xenophobia against the Ryukyuans, with the most serious discrimination they endure linked to their opposition of American military installations in the archipelago.

== Etymology ==
In English, they are also known as Okinawans or Lewchewans.

The English term "Ryukyuan" derives from Ryūkyū, the Japanese pronunciation of the Chinese name for the islands, Liuqiu (also spelled as Loo Choo, Lew Chew, Luchu, and more). In the Okinawan language, it is pronounced Ruuchuu. However, it is an exonym rather than a self-designation. In the indigenous language of the main island of Okinawa, locals often refer to themselves and their identity as Okinawan or Uchinaanchu. Another endonym is Shimanchu (島人). These terms are rarely used outside of the ethnic community, and are politicized markers of a distinct culture. Meanwhile, residents of the other island groups in the Ryukyu Islands maintain their own distinct self-designations and identities, and do not generally call themselves Uchinaanchu.

"Ryukyu" is another name from the Chinese side, and "Okinawa" is a Japanese cognate of Okinawa's indigenous name "Uchinaa", originating from the residents of the main island referring to the main island against the surrounding islands, Miyako and Yaeyama. Mainland Japanese adapted Okinawa as the way to call these people.

== Origins ==
=== Genetic studies ===
According to recent genetic studies, the Ryukyuans are a distinct genome-wide cluster within the Japanese people. They share more alleles with Southern Jōmon hunter-gatherers than Yayoi agriculturalists and have about 28% Jōmon ancestry although other studies estimate their Jōmon ancestry at 36% and 26.1%. This aligns with the dual-structure model proposed by Hanihara (1991), which suggests that the Yamato Japanese are more admixed with Asian agricultural continental people (from the Korean Peninsula) than the Ainu and the Ryukyuans, with major admixture occurring in and after the Yayoi period (3,000–1,700 years ago). This Jōmon ancestry lasted until the Gusuku Period, around 11th century AD, where there was significant admixture with mainland Japanese, who had tripartite ancestry consisting of Jōmon, East Asian and Northeast Asian ancestries. Overall, admixture rates with mainland Japanese differed between Northern Ryukyuans (77%) and Southern Ryukyuans (81%) despite the geographic distance between the southern islands and mainland Japan. Other studies estimate higher mainland Japanese contribution at 82–83%.

According to archaeological evidence, Northern Ryukyuan islands (Amami Islands and Okinawa Islands) and Southern Ryukyuan islands (Miyako Islands and Yaeyama Islands) are culturally and genetically differentiated. The differentiation was especially pronounced between Okinawa and Miyako. It arose due to Holocene-era divergence between the populations and subsequent genetic drift rather than admixture with neighboring populations. There is also evidence of Amami islanders being more related to Mainland Japanese than Okinawan islanders. Northern Ryukyuan Jōmon were more related to Kyushuan Jōmon whilst Southern Ryukyuan Jōmon were more related to Late Jōmon population from Western Japan, especially Western Honshu and Shikoku, who were also closely related to the Jōmon population from ancient Korea. Other studies, however, suggest genetic homogeneity within the Jōmon. According to a 2026 study, the Ryukyuan Jōmon are differentiated from Mainland Jōmon by having slightly higher genetic input from continental Asians, represented by Oroqens.

Overall, mainland Japanese are genetically the closest to Ryukyuans, followed by Koreans and Chinese. Taiwanese aborigines are genetically distant from Ryukyuans despite being neighbors, with no evidence of gene flow from the former. According to an autosomal DNA analysis of Okinawan samples, they are closely related to contemporary East Asian populations, especially Japanese populations. They exhibit about 80% admixture with mainland Japanese, followed by 19% admixture with Chinese populations. They also have isolate characteristics. Mainland Japanese themselves also have high genetic affinities with Ryukyuans, especially contemporary Tōhoku, Kantō, and Kyūshū populations. Likewise, there are high genetic affinities between Ainu and Ryukyuans due to having higher Jōmon ancestry than the average mainland Japanese.

The female mtDNA and male Y chromosome markers are used to study human migrations. The research on the skeletal remains from the Neolithic Shell midden period (also known as Kaizuka period) in Okinawa, as well from the Gusuku Period, showed predominance of female haplogroups D4 and M7a and their genetic continuity in the contemporary female population of Okinawa. It is assumed that M7a represents "Jomon genotype" introduced by a Paleolithic ancestor from Southeast Asia or the southern region of the Asian continent, around the Last Glacial Maximum with the Ryukyu Islands as one of the probable origin spots; in contrast, the frequency of the D4 haplogroup is relatively high in East Asian populations, including in Japan, indicating immigrant Yayoi people, probably by the end of the late Kaizuka period, while haplogroup B4 presumably derived from aboriginal Taiwanese. However, as in the contemporary Japanese population, M7 showed a decrease, whereas the frequency of the haplogroup N9b showed an increase from the south to north direction, it indicates that the mobility pattern of females and males was different as the distribution of Y haplogroups do not show a geographical gradient in contrast to mtDNA, meaning mainly different maternal origins of the contemporary Ryukyuan and Ainu people. A 2023 study, however, suggests an indigenous origin for haplogroup M7a.

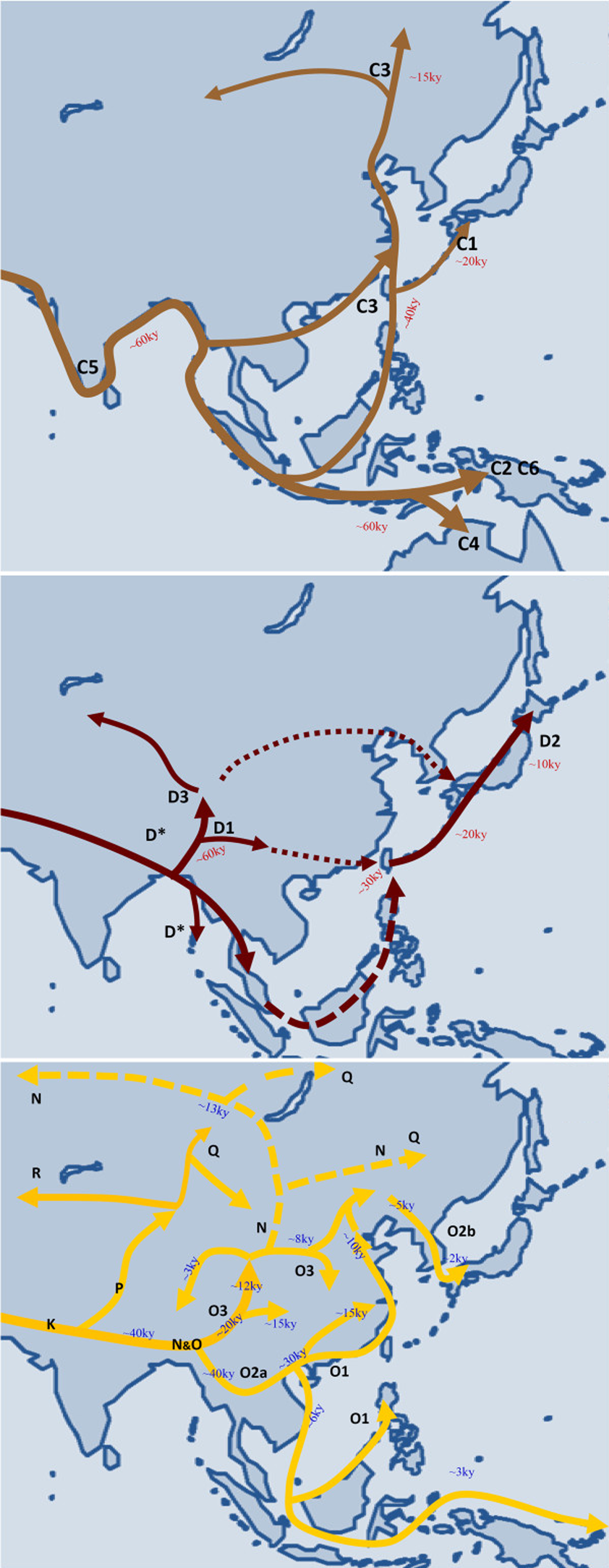
Migration routes of major Y-chromosome DNA haplogroups in East Asia.

The research on the contemporary Okinawan male Y chromosome showed, in 2006; 55.6% of haplogroup D-P-M55, 22.2% O-P31, 15.6% O-M122, 4.4% C-M8, and 2.2% others. It is considered that the Y haplogroups expanded in a demic diffusion. The haplogroups D and C are considered to be of Neolithic and Paleolithic origin, with coalescence time of 19,400 YBP and expansion 12,600 YBP (14,500 YBP and 10,820 YBP respectively), and were isolated for thousands of years once land bridges between Japan and continental Asia disappeared at the end of the last glacial maximum 12,000 YBP. The haplogroup O began its expansion circa 4,000–3,810 years ago, and thus the haplogroups D-M55 and C-M8 belong to the Jomon's male lineage, and haplogroup O belongs to the Yayoi's male lineage. Haplogroup M12 is considered as mitochondrial counterpart of Y chromosome D lineage. This rare haplogroup was detected only in Yamato Japanese, Koreans, and Tibetans, with the highest frequency and diversity in Tibet.

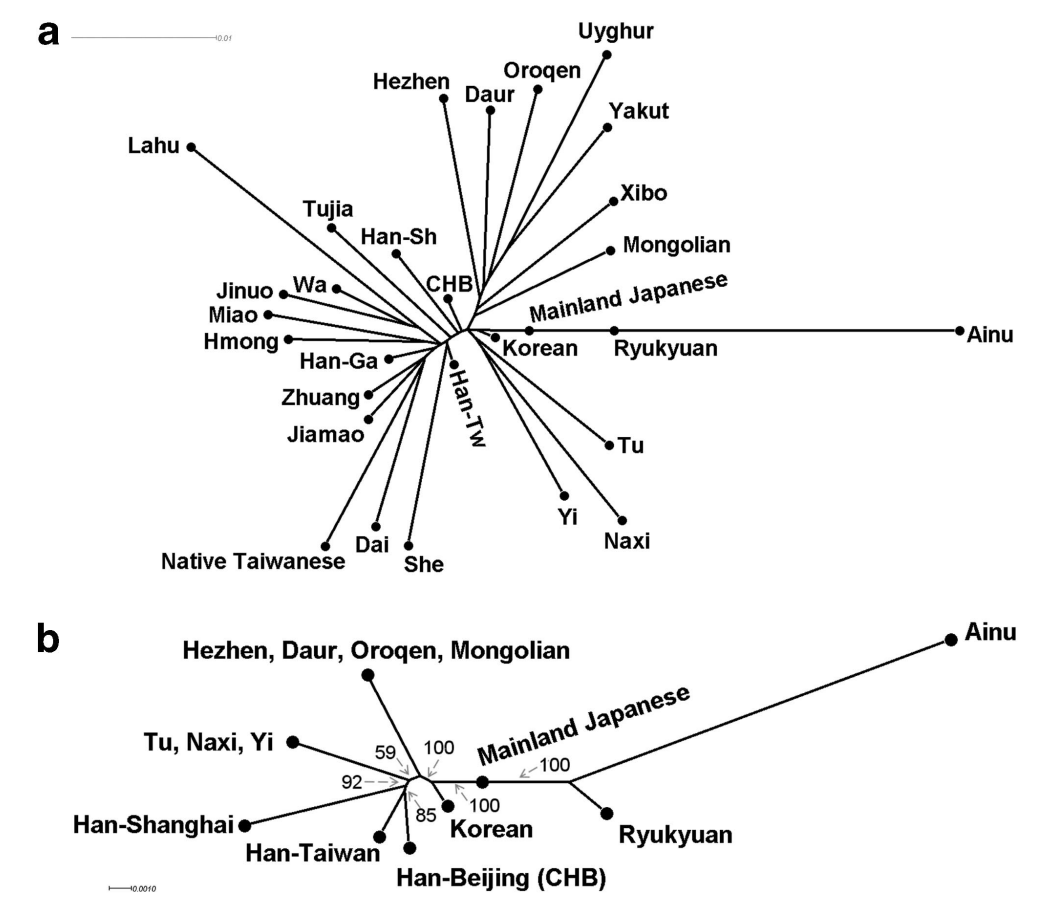
Phylogenetic tree of Mainland Japanese, Ryukyuan (Ryukyuan), Ainu (Ainu) and other Asian ethnic groups

=== Anthropological studies ===
Comparative studies on dental diversity showed long-term gene flow from outside sources (Honshu Island and southern East Asia), long-term isolation, and genetic drift, which produced morphological diversity among the modern Ryukyuans. This analysis, however, contradicts the idea of homogeneity among the Jōmon people and close affinities between the Ainu and the Ryukyuans. A 2017 craniometric study states that the Ryukyuans were more similar to Yamato people and their ancestors, the Yayoi people. The Ryukyuans differ strongly from the Ainu people, which, according to the authors, is strong evidence for heterogeneity among the Jōmon period population.

According to a 2019 study, Ryukyuans shared some facial features with Ainu but there were also some differences. Specifically, they retained the phenotypes of Neolithic Shell midden-era populations. Compared to mainland Japanese, Ryukyuans were shorter, had broader faces and lower facial and nasal heights. But they also had broader nasal bones and more prominent glabellas and nasal roots. Their non-metric dental characteristics were intermediate between the Sinodonty of mainland Japanese and Sundadonty of Ainu. Another study suggests better preservation of phenotypes associated with the Jōmon, including Ainu people, and Yayoi populations in the southernmost regions of Japan due to less influence from recent Northeast Asian migrations.

According to a 2023 study, there were no significant differences in craniofacial or facial shapes within the Jōmon. However, Southern and Western Jōmon often have a more globular neurocranium when viewed in the sagittal plane compared to Northeastern Honshu Jōmon, who often have high and large frontal regions, along with low, more compressed and angled occipital regions. This reflects a shift towards agricultural lifestyles among Southern and Western Jōmon whilst older forager lifestyles were upheld by Northeastern Honshu Jōmon. Jōmon from Southern and Western Japan and inland central Honshu also differ from Jōmon from coastal central Honshu, Northeastern Honshu and Hokkaido in terms of their temporalis muscle region, reflecting differential influences of plant-based and marine-based diets respectively. The former is described as having "an anteroposteriorly shorter, superoinferiorly taller temporalis region with a mediolaterally narrower temporal fossa".

A 2024 study analyzed two Jōmon-era remains from the Ryukyuan islands; the 'Minatogawa I' and 'Shiraho 4'. 'Minatogawa I' resembled Wadjak from Indonesia than to Upper Cave and Liujiang individuals from China and had morphological affinities with Australo-Melanesians. 'Shiraho 4', on the other hand, resembled prehistoric Southeast Asians, along with mainland Jōmon and Mintogawa. A 2025 study, however, shows no significant inter-phase or geographical differences among different Jōmon specimens. However, variations within phases and geographical regions are more salient.

=== Challenging the notion of ethnic homogeneity in Japan ===
The existence of the Ryukyuans challenges the notion of ethnic homogeneity in post-WWII Japan. After the demise of the multi-ethnic Empire of Japan in 1945, successive governments had forged a single Japanese identity by advocating monoculturalism and denying the existence of ethnic minority groups. The notion of ethnic homogeneity was so ingrained in Japan that the former Deputy Prime Minister Taro Aso notably claimed in 2020 that "No other country but this one has lasted for as long as 2,000 years with one language, one ethnic group and one dynasty".

== History ==
=== Early history ===
The Ryukyu Islands were inhabited from at least 32,000–18,000 years ago, but their fate and relation with contemporary Ryukyuans is uncertain. During the Jōmon period (i.e., Kaizuka) or so-called shell midden period (6,700–1,000 YBP) of the Northern Ryukyus, the population lived in a hunter-gatherer society, with similar mainland Jōmon pottery. In the latter part of Jōmon period, archaeological sites moved near the seashore, suggesting the engagement of people in fishery. It is considered that from the latter half of Jōmon period, the Ryukyu Islands developed their own culture. Some scholars consider that the language and cultural influence was more far-reaching than blending of race and physical types. The Yayoi culture which had a major influence on the Japanese islands, is traditionally dated from 3rd century BCE and recently from around 1000 BCE, and is notable for the introduction of Yayoi-type pottery, metal tools and cultivation of rice, however although some Yayoi pottery and tools were excavated on the Okinawa Islands, the rice was not widely cultivated before the 12th century CE, nor the Yayoi and the following Kofun period (250–538 CE) culture expanded into the Ryukyus. The Southern Ryukyus culture was isolated from the Northern, and its Shimotabaru period (4,500–3,000 YBP) was characterized by a specific style of pottery, and the Aceramic period (2,500–800 YBP), during which no pottery was produced in this region. Their prehistoric Yaeyama culture showed some affinities with various Taiwanese cultures. The Sakishima Islands likewise have some affinities with Southeast Asian and South Pacific cultures. The Amami Islands, however, have the most mainland Japanese influence. Both north and south Ryukyus were culturally unified in the 10th century.

The finding of ancient Chinese knife money near Naha in Okinawa indicates a probable contact with the ancient Chinese state Yan as early as the 3rd century BCE. According to the Shan Hai Jing, the Yan had relations with the Wa ('dwarf', 'short') people living southeast of Korea, who could be related to both the mainland Japanese or Ryukyuans. The futile search for the elixir of immortality by Qin Shi Huang, the founder of the Qin dynasty (221–206 BCE), in which the emperor tried to cooperate with "happy immortals" who dwelt on the islands, could be related to both Japan and Ryukyu Islands. There is a lack of evidence that the missions by the Han dynasty (206 BCE–220 CE) reached the islands; however, as the Japanese did reach Han's capital, notes from 57 CE do mention a general practice of tattooing among the people of "hundred kingdoms" in the eastern islands, a practice which was widespread and survived only among the Okinawan's women, Ainu in Hokkaido, and Atayal people in Taiwan. Cao Wei (220–265) and Han dynasty records show that the inhabitants of western and southern Japan and Okinawa had a lot in common regarding political-social institutions until the 2nd century CE – they were of small stature, bred oxen and swine, and were ruled by women, with a special influence of women sorceresses, related to the Ryukyuan Noro priestesses which were closely associated with local political power until the 20th century, as well as with the Ryukyuan swine economy culture until World War II. It is suggested that the mention of a specific sorceress Pimeku, her death and successive conflict, is related to some socio-political challenges of the ancient matriarchal system.

The first certain mention of the islands and its people by the Chinese and Japanese is dated in the 7th century. Emperor Yang of Sui, due to previous tradition, between 607 and 608 held expeditions in search of the "Land of Happy Immortals". As the Chinese envoy and the islanders linguistically could not understand each other, and the islanders did not want to accept the Sui rule and suzerainty, the Chinese envoy took many captives back to the court. The islands, by the Chinese named Liuqiu (Middle Chinese: Lɨuɡɨu), would be pronounced by the Japanese as Ryukyu. However, when the Japanese diplomat Ono no Imoko arrived at the Chinese capital he noted that the captives probably arrived from the island of Yaku south of Kyushu. In 616 the Japanese annals for the first time mention the "Southern Islands people", and for the half-century were noted some intruders from Yaku and Tanu. According to the Shoku Nihongi, in 698 a small force dispatched by Japanese government successfully claimed the Tane-jima, Yakushima, Amami, Tokunoshima and other islands. The Shoku Nihongi recorded that the Hayato people in southern Kyushu still had female chieftains in the early 8th century. In 699 are mentioned islands Amami and Tokara, in 714 Shingaki and Kume, in 720 some 232 persons who had submitted to the Japanese capital Nara, and at last Okinawa in 753. Nevertheless, the mention or authority, over the centuries the Japanese influence spread slowly among the communities.

=== Gusuku period ===
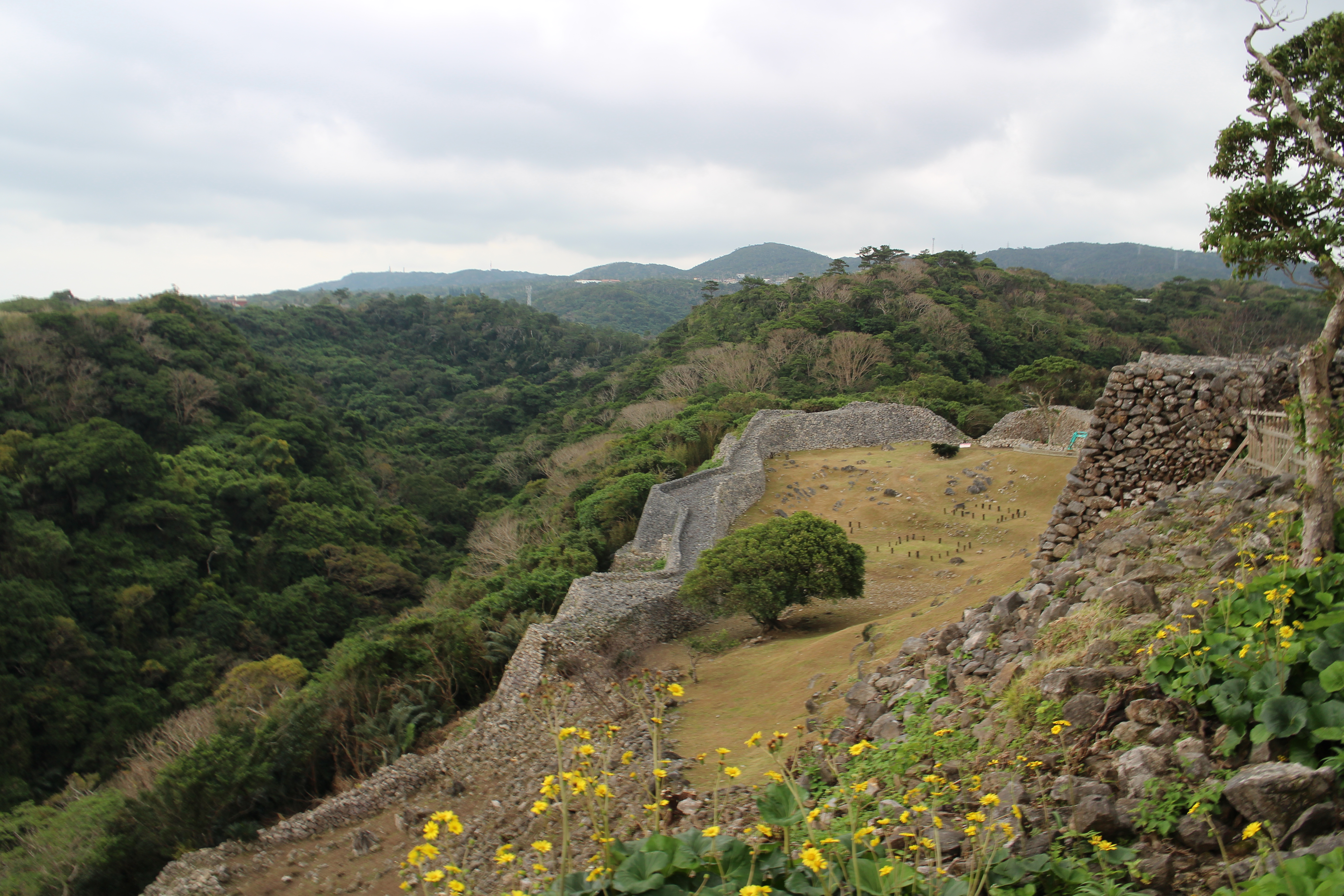
The gusuku fortification are on the Gusuku Sites and Related Properties of the Kingdom of Ryukyu UNESCO's list.

The lack of written record resulted with later, 17th century royal tales both under Chinese and Japanese influence, which were efforts by local chieftains to explain the "divine right" of their royal authority, as well the then-political interests of Tokugawa shōguns from Minamoto clan who wanted to legitimize Japanese domination over Okinawa. The tradition states that the founder of the Tenson dynasty was a descendant of goddess Amamikyu, and the dynasty ruled 17,000 years and had 25 kings i.e. chieftains. However, the 24th throne was usurped from one of Tenson's descendants by a man named Riyu, who was defeated in revolt led by Shunten (1187–1237), lord of Urasoe. Shunten's parental origin is a matter of debate, according to 17th century romantic tales he was a son of a local Okinawan chief's (anji) daughter and some Japanese adventurer, usually considered Minamoto no Tametomo, while historical and archeological-traditional evidence indicate men from the defeated Taira clan who fled Minamoto's clan vengeance. The Shunten dynasty made two additional chieftains, Shunbajunki (1237–1248) and Gihon (1248–1259). As Gihon abdicated, his sessei Eiso (1260–1299), who claimed Tenson's descent, founded the Eiso dynasty.

During the Gusuku period (c. 1187–1314), with recent chronology dated from c. 900–950 CE, Okinawans experienced significant political, social and economical growth. The period is named after the many gusuku, castle-like fortifications which were built on higher ground as the center of power moved inland. This period is also notable for the introduction of rice, wheat, and millet — fairly late compared to mainland Japan — along with the beginning of overseas trade in these agricultural goods. The Japanese kana writing system, in its older and simple phonetic form, was introduced during this period under the reign of Shunbajunki. After years of famine and epidemic during Gihon's rule, Eiso enacted a regular taxation system (of weapons, grains and cloth) in 1264. As the government gained strength, central control extended from Okinawa toward the islands of Kume, Kerama, Iheya, and Amami Ōshima (1266). Between 1272 and 1274, as the Mongol invasions of Japan began, Okinawa on two occasions rejected the Mongols' demands of submission. The introduction of Buddhism into Okinawa also occurred during the reign of Eiso.

=== Sanzan period ===
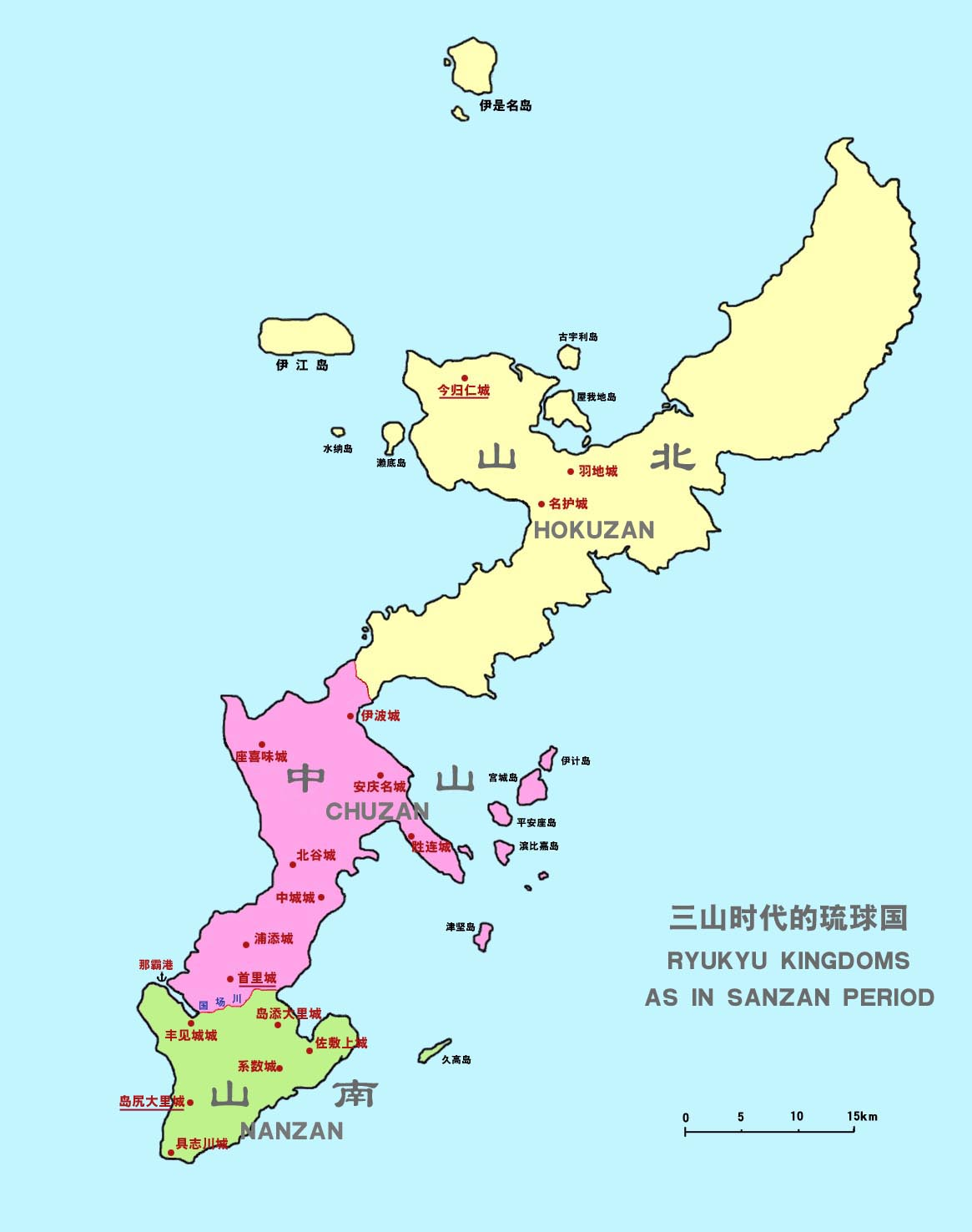
Map of Okinawa Island, showing the Sanzan period polities

During the rule of Eiso's great-grandson, Tamagusuku (1314–1336), Okinawa became divided into three polities and began the so-called Sanzan period (1314–1429). The north and largest Hokuzan polity was the poorest due to forest and mountainous terrain (in which isolation was an advantage), with primitive farming and fishing. The central Chūzan polity was the most advantaged due to its developed castle towns and harbor facilities. The south Nanzan polity was the smallest, but endured because of good castle positions and sea merchants.

In this period, another rapid economical, social and cultural development of Ryukyu began as the polities had developed formal trade relations with Japan, Korea and China. During the Satto's reign, Chūzan made tributary relations with China's Ming dynasty in 1374 as the Hongwu Emperor sent envoys in 1372 to Okinawa. In the next two decades Chūzan made nine official missions to the Chinese capital, and the formal relations between them endured until 1872 (see Imperial Chinese missions to the Ryukyu Kingdom). Despite significant Chinese economical, cultural and political influence, the polities continued to maintain strong autonomy. In 1392, all three polities began to send extensive missions to the Korean Joseon kingdom. In 1403, Chūzan made formal relations with the Japanese Ashikaga shogunate, and an embassy was sent to Thailand in 1409. The contacts with Siam continued even in 1425, and were newly made with places like Palembang in 1428, Java in 1430, Malacca and Sumatra in 1463.

As in 1371, China initiated its maritime prohibition policy (Haijin) to Japan, Ryukyu gained a lot from its position as intermediary in the trade between Japan and China. They shipped horses, sulphur and seashells to China, from China brought ceramics, copper, and iron, from southeast Asian countries bought tin, ivory, spices (pepper), wood (sappanwood), which they sold to Japan, Korea or China, as well as transporting Chinese goods to Hakata Bay from where swords, silver and gold were brought.

In 1392, 36 Chinese families from Fujian were invited by the chieftain of Okinawa Island's central polity (Chūzan) to settle near the port of Naha and to serve as diplomats, interpreters, and government officials. Some consider that many Ryukyuan officials were descended from these Chinese immigrants, being born in China or having Chinese grandfathers. They assisted the Ryukyuans in advancing their technology and diplomatic relations. From the same year onward Ryukyu was allowed to send official students to China i.e. Guozijian. The tributary relationship with China later became a basis of the 19th century Sino-Japanese disputes about the claims of Okinawa.

=== Ryukyu Kingdom ===
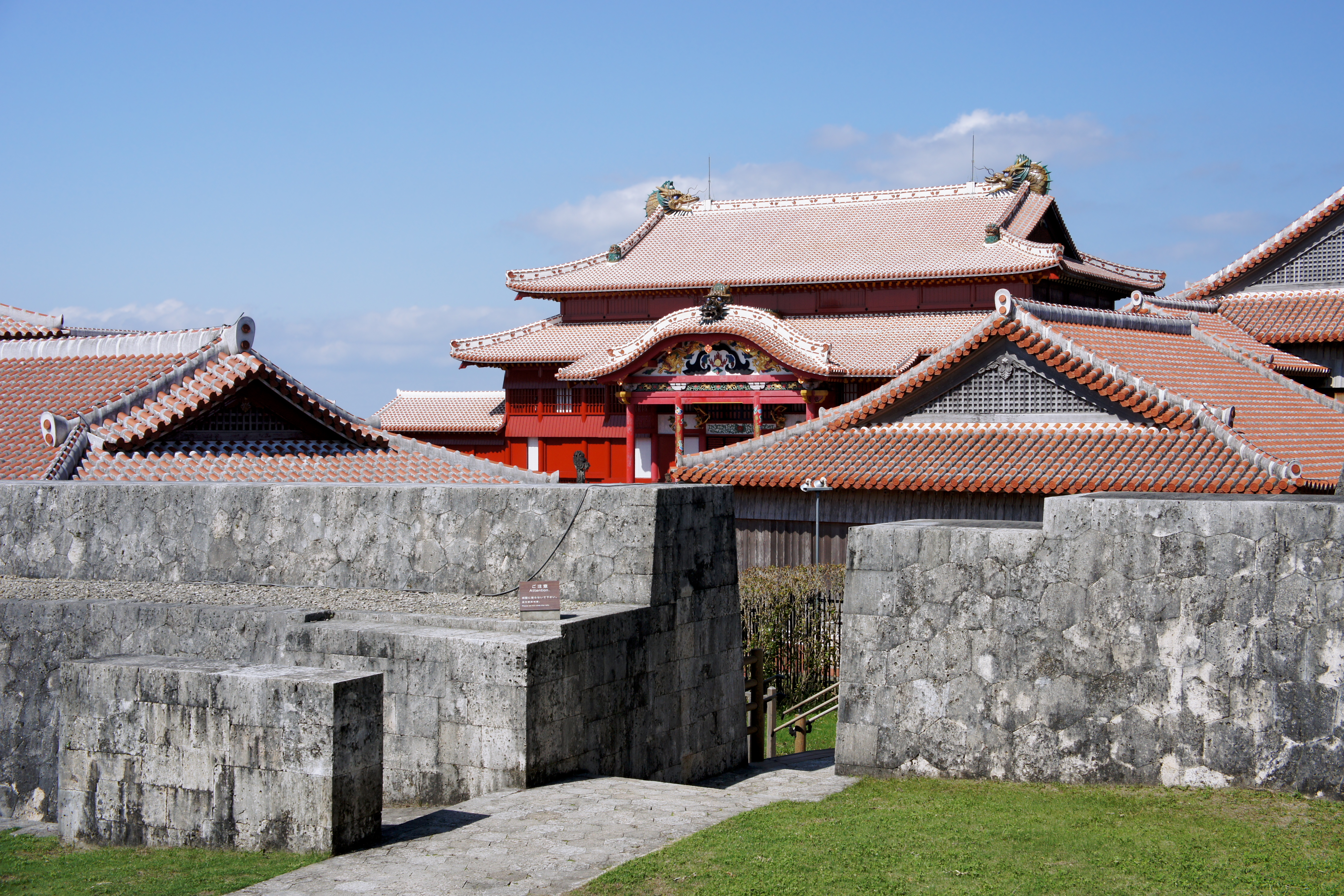
The castle town and Ryukyu Kingdom's capital Shuri Castle

Between 1416 and 1429, Chūzan chieftain Shō Hashi successfully unified the principalities into the Ryukyuan Kingdom (1429–1879) with the castle town Shuri as royal capital, founded the First Shō dynasty, and the island continued to prosper through maritime trade, especially tributary relations with the Ming dynasty. The period of Shō Shin's (1477–1526) rule, descendant from the Second Shō dynasty, is notable for peace and relative prosperity, peak in overseas trade, as well as expansion of the kingdom's firm control to Kikaijima, Miyako-jima and Yaeyama Islands (1465–1524), while during Shō Sei (1526–1555) to Amami Ōshima (1537).

After the Kyūshū Campaign (1586–1587) by Toyotomi Hideyoshi, his assistant Kamei Korenori, who was interested in southern trade, wanted to be rewarded with the Ryukyu Islands. A paper fan found during the Japanese invasions of Korea (1592–98) mentioning a title "Kamei, Lord of Ryukyu", reveals that Hideyoshi at least nominally offered the post although he had no legitimate claim upon the islands. In 1591, Kamei ventured with a force to reclaim the islands, but the Shimazu clan stopped him as they guarded their special relationship with the Ryukyu kingdom. Hideyoshi was not very concerned about the quarrel because the invasion of Korea was more important in his mind. As the Ming's influence weakened due to disorder in China, the Japanese established posts in Southeast Asia, and the Europeans (Spanish and Portuguese) arrived, the kingdom's overseas trade began to decline.

In the early 17th century during the Tokugawa shogunate (1603–1867), the first shōgun Tokugawa Ieyasu intended to subject the kingdom to enable intermediary trade with China, and in 1603 ordered the Ryukyuan king to pay his respect to the shogunate. As the king did not react, with the instruction of the shōgun, the Satsuma feudal domain of the Shimazu clan in Kyūshū incorporated some of kingdom's territory during the 1609 Invasion of Ryukyu. They nominally let a certain level of autonomy and independence to the kingdom due to Ming's prohibition of trade with the shogunate, but forbade them trade with other countries except China. The Amami Islands became part of Shimazu's territory, taxes were imposed, making them subordinate in the relations between Japan and China. Until the invasion, the Shimazu clan lords for four centuries had a vague title of the "Lords of the Twelve Southern Islands" or "Southern Islands", although initially meaning the near Kyushu islands, then covering all the Ryukyu Islands. Later in the 1870s this was used as a "justification" of Japan's sovereignty. From 1609 the Ryukyuan missions to Edo started which lasted until 1850.

During the rule of kings Shō Shitsu (1648–1668) and Shō Tei (1669–1709) i.e. sessei Shō Shōken (1666–1673) were recovered the internal social and economical stability with many laws about government organisation, and affairs like sugarcane production, and tax system with emphasis on agricultural production. The production was encouraged because Satsuma's annual tax deprived Ryukyu's internal resources. Although the production of sweet potatoes and sugar industry grew, the peasants were not allowed to enlarge their fields. The agricultural reforms especially continued under king Shō Kei (1713–1752) and his sanshikan advisor Sai On (1728–1752) whose Nomucho (Directory of Agricultural Affairs) from 1743 became the basis of the agricultural administration until the 19th century. In the Sakishima Islands great part of the tax was paid in textiles made of ramie. The relations with the Qing dynasty improved after their second mission when the first Ryukyuan official students were sent to China in 1688.

In the first half of the 19th century, French politicians like Jean-Baptiste Cécille unsuccessfully tried to conclude a French trade treaty with Ryukyu, with only a promise by Shuri government about the admission of Christian missionaries. However, due to extreme measures in teaching, Bernard Jean Bettelheim's propagation of Protestantism between 1846 and 1854 was obscured by the government.

=== Meiji period ===
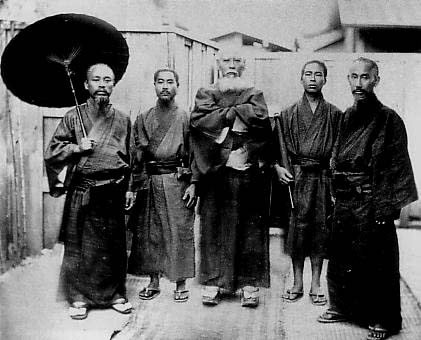
Five Ryukyuan men, Meiji period

During the Meiji period (1868–1912) the "Ryukyu shobun" process began, according to which the Ryukyuan Kingdom came under the jurisdiction of Kagoshima Prefecture in 1871, encompassing the southern tip of Kyushu and the Ryukyuan islands to its south; this created the Ryukyu Domain (1872–1879) of Meiji-era Japan. This method of gradual integration was designed to avoid both Ryukyuan and Chinese protests, with the ruling Shuri government unaware of the significance of these developments, including Japan's decision to grant political representation to the Ryukyuan islanders involved in the Japanese invasion of Taiwan (1874).

In 1875, the Ryukyuans were forced to terminate their tributary relations with China, against their preference for a state of dual allegiance to both China and Japan, something a then-weakened China was unable to stop. A proposal by the 18th U.S. President Ulysses S. Grant for a sovereign Okinawa and the division of the other islands between China and Japan was rejected, with a last-minute decision by the Chinese government not to ratify the agreement rendering it null. On three occasions between 1875 and 1879, the last Ryukyuan King, Shō Tai, refused to submit to the demands placed upon his people, and in 1879, his domain was formally abolished and established as Okinawa Prefecture, forcing his move to Tokyo with the reduced status of Viscount.

Members of the Ryukyuan aristocratic classes such as Kōchi Chōjō and Rin Seikō continued to resist annexation for almost two decades; however, following the First Sino-Japanese War (1894–1895), both Chinese and Ryukyuan interest in sovereignty faded as China renounced its claims to the island. Many historians criticise Meiji-era Japan's characterisation of the process as being considered a relatively simple administrative change, rather than the creation of Japan's first colony and the beginning of its "inner colonialism".

During the Meiji period, as with the Ainu people of Hokkaido, the Ryukyuans had their own culture, religion, traditions and language suppressed by the Meiji government in the face of forced assimilation. From the 1880s onwards, schools forbade the display of Ryukyuan styles of dress, hairstyles and other visual aspects, considering them to be backwards and inferior, with students forced to wear Japanese clothing and to assimilate into Japanese culture. Indoctrination into a militaristic and Emperor-centred ideology for children began from the age of beginning elementary school onwards; the ultimate goal of this education was a total unification of the Ryukyuans into the Yamato people, embodying the ideal of ethnic purity, with contemporary Nihonjinron literature for the time ignoring Japan's minorities. Ryukyuans often faced prejudice, humiliation in the workplace and ethnic discrimination, with the Ryukyuan elite divided into factions either in support of or in opposition to assimilation. Negative stereotypes and discrimination were common against the Ryukyuans in the Japanese society.

Around and especially after the Japanese annexation of Taiwan in 1895, Japan's developmental focus shifted away from Okinawa, resulting in a period of famine known as "Sotetsu-jigoku" ("Cycad hell"). Between 1920 and 1921, a fall in sugar prices, as well as the transfer of Japan's sugar production to Taiwan, led to Ryukyu being the poorest prefecture, despite having the heaviest taxation burden; the drop in sugar prices would continue into 1931, further worsening the situation. As a result of the ensuing economic crisis, many people were forced to either find work in Japan (often Osaka and Kobe) or abroad in Taiwan. By 1935, roughly 15% of the population had emigrated.

=== WWII and post-war history ===
During World War II and battles like the Battle of Okinawa (1945), approximately 150,000 civilians (1/3 of the population) were killed in Okinawa alone. After the war, the Ryukyu Islands were occupied by the United States Military Government of the Ryukyu Islands (1945–1950), but the U.S. maintained control even after the 1951 Treaty of San Francisco, which went into effect on 28 April 1952, as the USMMGR was replaced by the United States Civil Administration of the Ryukyu Islands (1950–1972). During this period the U.S. military requisitioned private land for the building of their facilities, with the former owners put into refugee camps, and its personnel committed thousands of crimes against the civilians. Only twenty years later, on 15 May 1972, Okinawa and nearby islands were returned to Japan. Whereas the Japanese had enjoyed political freedom and economic prosperity in the post-war years, the facilities, used for the purposes of Japanese regional security against the communist threat, had a negative economic impact on the Islands, leading to many Ryukyuans feeling cheated, some considering the facilities a national disgrace. Since 1972 there have been extensive plans to bring Okinawa's economy up to the national level, as well continued support for the local culture and a revival of traditional arts started by the USCAR.

Okinawa comprises just 0.6% of Japan's total land mass, yet about 75% of all U.S. military installations stationed in Japan are assigned to bases in Okinawa. The presence of the military remains a sensitive issue in local politics. Negative feelings toward the mainland Government, Emperor (especially Hirohito due to his involvement in the sacrifice of Okinawa and later military occupation), and U.S. military (USFJ, SACO) have often caused open criticism and protests, for example by 85,000 people in 1995 after the U.S. military rape incident, and by 110,000 people in 2007 due to the Japanese Ministry of Education's textbook revisions (see MEXT controversy) which critics say downplays the involvement of the Japanese military in the forced mass suicide of the civilians during the Battle of Okinawa. For many years the Emperors avoided visiting Okinawa, with the first ever in history done by Akihito in 1993, since it was assumed that his visits would likely cause uproar, as in July 1975 when Akihito as a crown prince visited Okinawa and a firebomb was thrown at him, although these tensions have eased in recent years. Discrimination against Okinawans both past and present on the part of the mainland Japanese is the cause of their smoldering resentment against the government. There is a small post-war Ryukyu independence movement, but there are also Okinawans who wish to be assimilated with the mainland. A poll in 2017 by the Okinawa Times, Asahi Shimbun and Ryukyusu Asahi Broadcasting Corporation (QAB) jointly conducted prefectural public opinion surveys for voters in the prefecture. 82% of Okinawa citizens chose "I'm glad that Okinawa has returned as a Japanese prefecture". It was 90% for respondents of the ages of 18 to 29, 86% for those in their 30s, 84% for those aged 40–59, 72% for respondents in their 60s, 74% for those over the age of 70.

== Demography ==
Ryukyuans tend to see themselves as bound together by their home island and, especially among older Ryukyuans, usually consider themselves from Okinawa first and Japan second. The average annual income per resident of Okinawa in 2006 was ¥2.09 million, placing the prefecture at the bottom of the list of 47.

The Okinawans have a very low age-adjusted mortality rate at older ages and among the lowest prevalence of cardiovascular disease and other age-associated diseases in the world. Furthermore, Okinawa has long had the highest life expectancy at older ages, as well has had among the highest prevalence of centenarians among the 47 Japanese prefectures, also the world, since records began to be kept by the Ministry of Health in the early 1960s despite the high birth rate and expanding population of Okinawa prefecture. This longevity phenotype has been in existence since records have been kept in Japan, and despite the well-known dietary and other nongenetic lifestyle advantages of the Okinawans (Blue Zone), there may be some additional unknown genetic influence favoring this extreme phenotype. The Okinawa Centenarian Study (OCS) research team began to work in 1976, making it the world's longest ongoing population-based study of centenarians.

== Culture ==
=== Language ===
Similarities between the Ryukyuan and Japanese languages point to a common origin, possibly of immigrants from continental Asia to the archipelago. Although previously ideologically considered by Japanese scholars as a Japanese dialect and a descendant of Old Japanese, modern linguists such as Thomas Pellard (2015) now classify the Ryukyuan languages as a distinct subfamily of Japonic that diverged before the Old Japanese period (c. 8th century CE); this places them in contrast to Japonic languages that are direct descendants of Old Japanese, namely Japanese and Hachijō. Early literature which records the language of the Old Japanese imperial court shows archaisms which are closer to Okinawan dialects, while later periods of Japanese exhibit more significant Sinicization (such as Sino-Japanese vocabulary) than most Ryukyuan languages. This can be attributed to the fact that the Japanese (or Yamato people) received writing from the Sinosphere roughly a millennium before the Ryukyuan languages.

As the Jōmon-Yayoi transition (c. 1000 BCE) represents the formative period of the contemporary Japanese people from a genetic standpoint, it is argued that the Japonic languages are related to the Yayoi migrants as well. The estimated time of separation between Ryukyuan and mainland Japanese is a matter of debate due to methodological problems; older estimates (1959–2009) varied between 300 BCE and 700 CE, while novel (2009–2011) around 2nd century BCE to 100 CE, which has a lack of correlation with archeology and new chronology according to which Yayoi period started around 950 BCE, or the proposed spread of the Proto-Ryukyuan speakers to the islands in the 10–12th century from Kyushu. Based on linguistic differences, they separated at least before the 7th century, before or around Kofun period (c. 250–538), while mainland Proto-Ryukyuan was in contact with Early Middle Japanese until 13th century.

The Ryukyuan languages can be subdivided into two main groups, Northern Ryukyuan languages and Southern Ryukyuan languages. The Southern Ryukyuan subfamily shows north-to-south expansion, while Northern Ryukyuan does not, and several hypothetical scenarios can be proposed to explain this. It is generally considered that the likely homeland of Japonic—and thus the original expansion of Proto-Ryukyuan—was in Kyushu, though an alternate hypothesis proposes an expansion from the Ryukyu Islands to mainland Japan.

Although authors differ regarding which varieties are counted as dialects or languages, one possible classification considers there to be five Ryukyuan languages: Amami, Okinawa, Miyako, Yaeyama and Yonaguni, while a sixth, Kunigami, is sometimes differentiated from Okinawan due to its diversity. Within these languages exist dialects of local towns and specific islands, many of which have gone extinct. Although the Shuri dialect of Okinawan was historically a prestige language of the Kingdom of Ryukyu, there is no officially standardized Ryukyuan language. Thus, the Ryukyuan languages as a whole constitute a cluster of local dialects that can be considered unroofed abstand languages.

During the Meiji and post-Meiji period, the Ryukyuan languages were considered to be dialects of Japanese and viewed negatively. They were suppressed by the Japanese government in policies of forced assimilation and into using the standard Japanese language. From 1907, children were prohibited to speak Ryukyuan languages in school, and since the mid-1930s there existed dialect cards, a system of punishment for the students who spoke in a non-standard language. Speaking a Ryukyuan language was deemed an unpatriotic act; by 1939, Ryukyuan speakers were denied service and employment in government offices, while by the Battle of Okinawa in 1945, the Japanese military was commanded to consider Ryukyuan speakers as spies to be punished by death, with many reports that such actions were carried out. After World War II, during the United States occupation, the Ryukyuan languages and identity were distinctively promoted, also because of ideo-political reasons to separate the Ryukyus from Japan. However, resentment against the American occupation intensified Ryukyuans' rapport and unification with Japan, and since 1972 there has followed re-incursion of the standard Japanese and further diminution of the Ryukyuan languages.

It was considered that contemporary people older than 85 exclusively use Ryukyuan, between 45 and 85 use Ryukyuan and standard Japanese depending on family or working environment, younger than 45 are able to understand Ryukyuan, while younger than 30 mainly are not able to understand nor speak Ryukyuan languages. Only older people speak Ryukyuan languages, because Japanese replaced it as the daily language in nearly every context. Some younger people speak Okinawan Japanese which is a type of Japanese. It is not a dialect of the Okinawan language. The six Ryukyuan languages are listed on the UNESCO's Atlas of the World's Languages in Danger since 2009, as they could disappear by the mid-century (2050). It is unclear whether this recognition was too late, despite some positive influence by the Society of Spreading Okinawan.

=== Religion ===
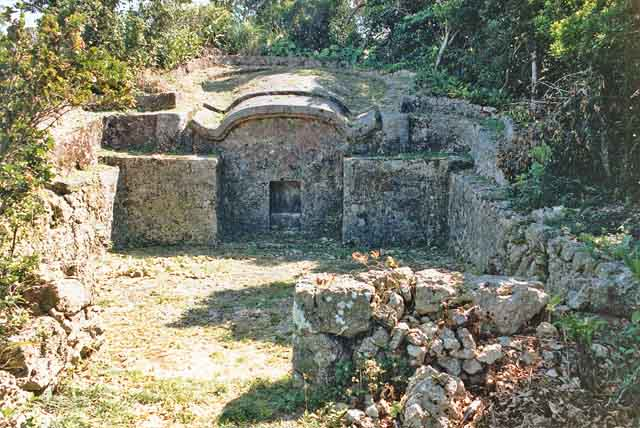
The kamekōbaka (Turtleback tomb) is the traditional Ryukyuan family tomb.

Indigenous Ryukyuan religion places strong emphasis upon the role of the women in the community, with women holding positions as shamans and guardians of the home and hearth. The status of women in traditional society is higher than in China and Japan. Although the contemporary kinship system is patrilineal and patrilocal, until the 20th century it was often bilateral and matrilocal, with common village endogamy. Shisa statues can often be seen on or in front of houses—this relates to the ancient Ryukyuan belief that the male spirit is the spirit of the outside and the female spirit is the spirit of the inside. Godhood is mimicked with many attributes, and its in ease without any underlying symbolic order.

The village priestesses, Noro, until the 20th century used the white cloth and magatama beads. The noro's duty was to preserve the generational fire in the hearth, a communal treasure, resulting with tabu system about the fire custodian in which they had to be virgins to maintain close communication with the ancestors. The office became hereditary, usually of the noro's brother's female child. The center of worship was represented by three heartstones within or near the house. The belief in the spiritual predominance of the sister was more prominent in Southern Ryukyus.

The introduction of Buddhism is ascribed to a 13th-century priest from Japan (mostly funeral rites), while the 14th century trade relations resulted with Korean Buddhism influences (including some in architecture), as well Shinto practices from Japan. Buddhism and indigenous religion were ideological basis until 18th century, when Confucianism gradually and officially became government ideology during Shō On (1795–1802), much to the dismay of Kumemura. It was mostly important to the upper-class families. Among the Catholic converts was not lost the former religious consciousness.

Until the 18th century, the Ryukyuan kings visited the Sefa-utaki (historical sacred place) caves for worship. Another traditional sacred places are springs Ukinju-Hain-ju, where was placed the first rice plantation, and small island Kudaka, where the "five fruits and grains" were introduced by divine people, perhaps strangers with agricultural techniques. The foremost account, which claimed common origin between the Japanese and Ryukyuans, was made-up by Shō Shōken in the 17th century, to end up the pilgrimage of the Ryukyu king and chief priestess to the Kudaka island.

The Eight Shrines of Ryūkyū were a group of shrines that received special status and support from the Ryukyu Kingdom's royal government. These shrines played a significant role in the religious and political life of the kingdom, as King Shō Toku worshiped Hachiman (Emperor Ōjin). Asato Hachiman Shrine is dedicated to Hachiman, while the seven others are Kumano shrines.

During the Meiji period, the government replaced Buddhism with Shintoism as the islands' state religion. The government subsequently ordered the rearrangement of statues and the redesign of shrines and temples to incorporate indigenous deities into the national Shinto pantheon. It also placed Shinto worship before indigenous, Buddhist, and Christian practices and transformed local divinities into guardian gods. In the 1920s, the government ordered the building of Shinto shrines and the remodelling of existing shrines with Shinto architectural symbols, paid by local tax revenue, which was a financial burden due to the collapse of sugar prices in 1921 which devastated Okinawa's economy. In 1932, Shinto clergy were brought over from the mainland and housed in Okinawa.

Most Ryukyuans of the younger generations are not serious adherents of the indigenous religion anymore. Additionally, since being under Japanese control, Shinto and Buddhism are also practiced and typically mixed with local beliefs and practices.

=== Cuisine ===
Okinawan food is rich in vitamins and minerals and has a good balance of protein, fats, and carbohydrates. Although rice is a staple food (taco rice mixes it with beef), pork (mimigā and chiragā, dishes Rafute and Soki), seaweed, rich miso (fermented soybean) pastes and soups (Jūshī), sweet potato and brown sugar all feature prominently in traditional cuisine. Most famous to tourists is the Momordica charantia, gōya (bitter melon), which is often mixed into a representative Okinawan stir fry dish known as champurū (Goya champuru). Kōrēgusu is a common hot sauce condiment used in various dishes including noodle soup Okinawa soba. Some specifically consumed algae include Caulerpa lentillifera. Traditional sweets include chinsuko, hirayachi, sata andagi, and muchi. Local beverages include juice from Citrus depressa, turmeric tea (ukoncha), and the alcoholic beverage awamori.

The weight-loss Okinawa diet derives from their cuisine and has only 30% of the sugar and 15% of the grains of the average Japanese dietary intake.

=== Arts ===
The techniques of self-defense and using farm tools as weapons against armed opponents—called karate by today's martial artists—were created by Ryukyuans who probably incorporated some gong fu and techniques from China into a complete system of attack and defense known simply as ta (literally meaning "hand"). These martial arts varied slightly from town to town, and were named for their towns of origin, examples being Naha-te (currently known as Goju-Ryū), Tomari-te and Shuri-te.

The Kabura-ya (Japanese signal arrow) still has a ceremonial use for house, village or festival celebration in Okinawa.

It is considered that the rhythms and patterns of dances, like Eisa and Angama, represent legends and prehistoric heritage. Ryūka genre of songs and poetry originate from the Okinawa Islands. From the Chinese traditional instrument sanxian in the 16th century developed the Okinawan instrument sanshin from which the kankara sanshin and the Japanese shamisen derive.

Women frequently wore indigo tattoos known as hajichi on the backs of their hands, a sign of adulthood and talisman to protect them from evil. These tattoos were banned in 1899 by the Meiji government. In remote districts their katakashira off-center topknot, similar to that of the Yami and some Filipino ethnic groups, among men and women also disappeared in the early 20th century.

The bashôfu, literally meaning "banana-fibre cloth", is designated as a part of Ryukyu and Japan "important intangible cultural properties". The weaving using indigenous ramie was also widespread in the archipelago, both originated before the 14th century.

Originally living in thatching houses, townsmen developed architecture modeled after Japanese, Chinese and Korean structures. Other dwellings suggest a tropical origin, and some villages have high stone walls, with similar structural counterpart in Yami people at Orchid Island.

For the categories of Cultural Properties, see the following lists: archaeological materials, historical materials, crafts, paintings, sculptures, writings, intangible, and tangible.

== See also ==
- Ethnic issues in Japan
- Okinawans in Hawaii
