= Unajara =

Queen of the Ryukyu Kingdom

Unajara 王妃
- Unajara (王妃; lit. « the queen »)
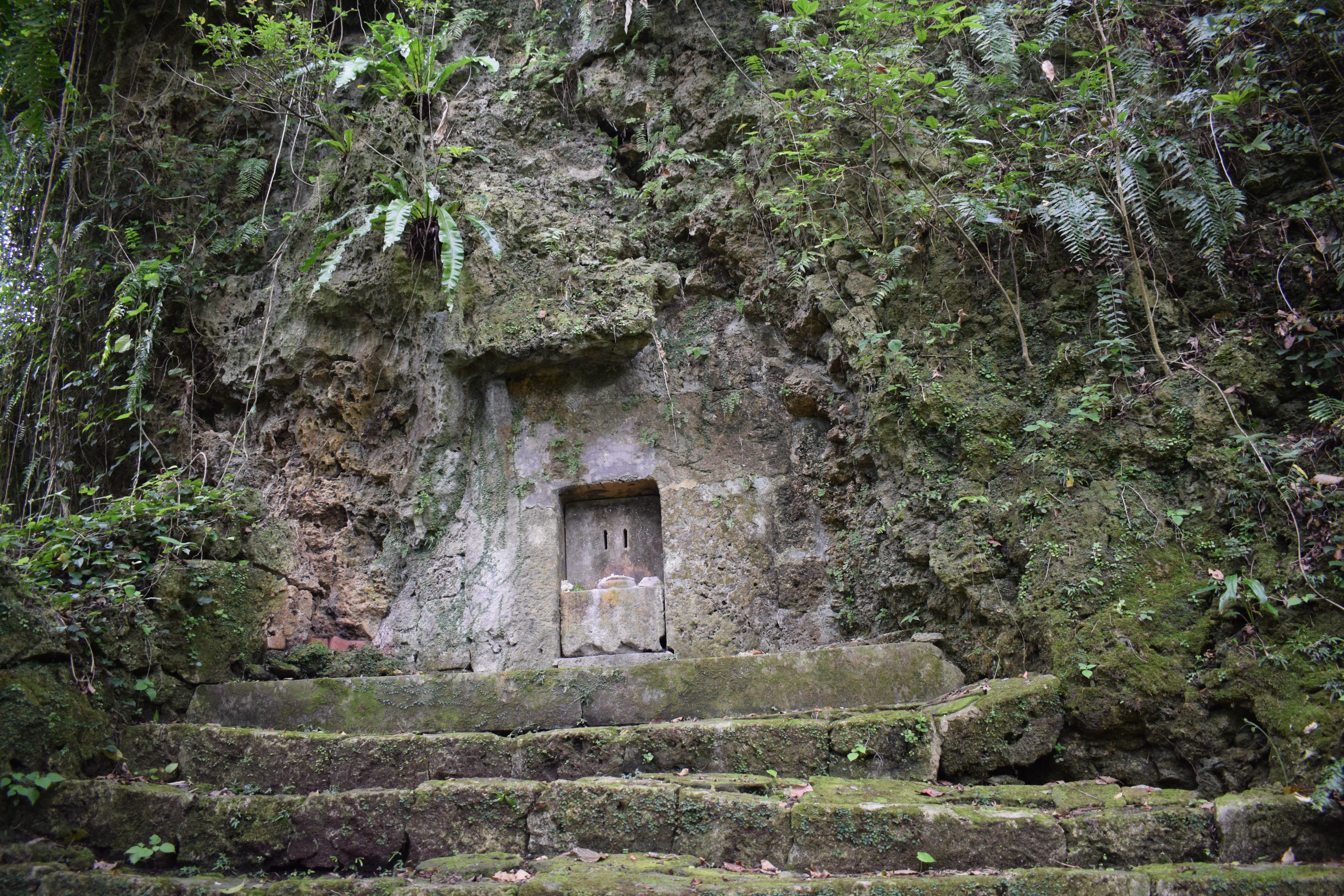
- Unajara-uhaka Tomb

Queen consort of the Ryukyu Kingdom
- Tenure: 1248-1259
- Predecessor: queen of Shunbajunki
- Successor: queen of Eiso
- Burial: Unajara-uhaka
- Spouse: Gihon
- Issue: a son and a daughter, unnamed

Unajara or Unazara (王妃; lit. "the queen") is the name under which the queen of King Gihon is known. Gihon was the third and last king of the Shunten dynasty, a largely mythical dynasty that reigned over all or part of Okinawa Island in the 12th and 13th centuries.

== Historical sources ==
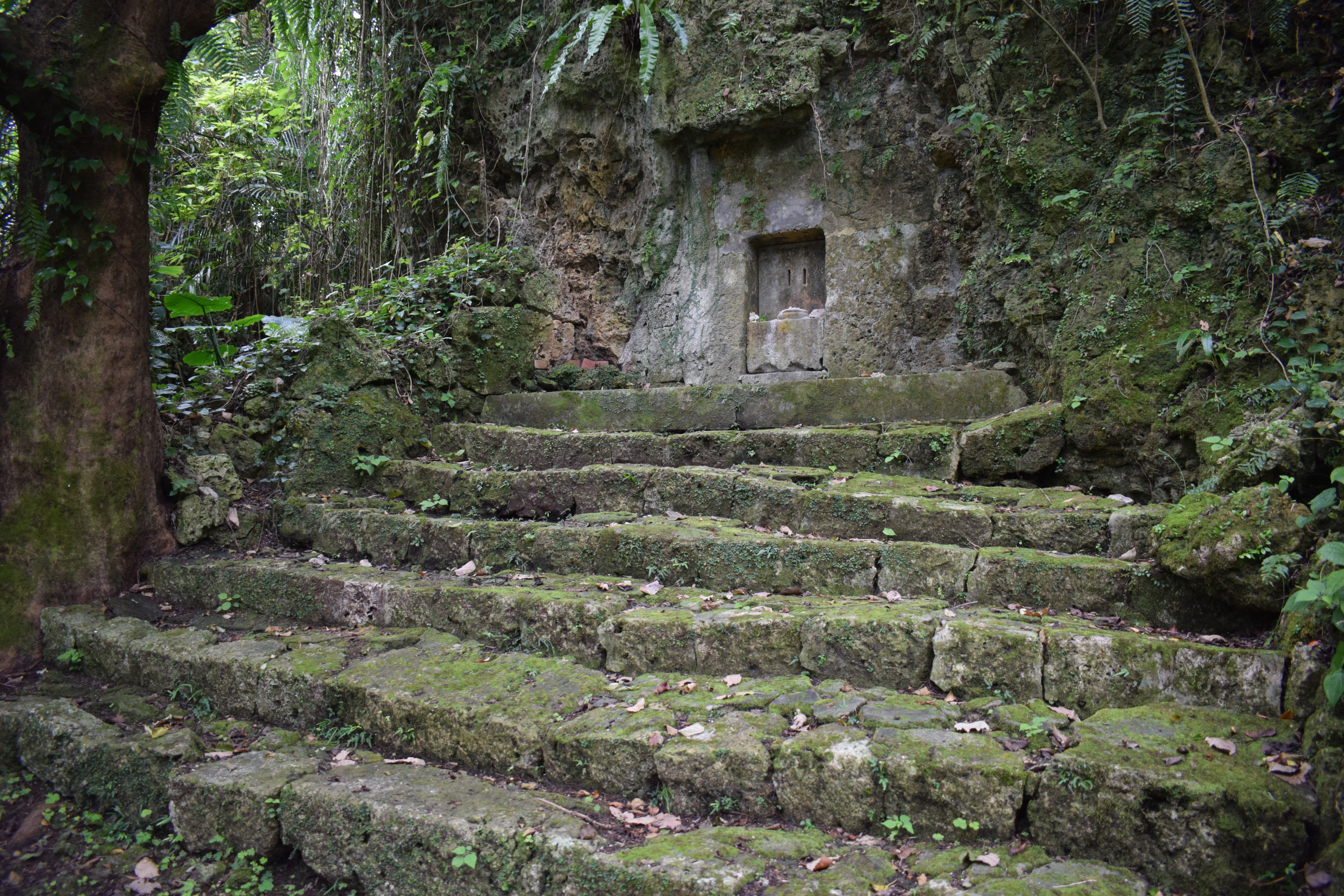
Unajara-uhaka Tomb

Official sources of Ryūkyūan history (Chūzan Seikan, Chūzan Seifu...) mention that there is no data concerning Gihon's queen., However, the tomb Unajara-uhaka (王妃御墓; lit. "the queen’s sacred tomb", also Unazara-uhaka), located in Kishaba in Kitanakagusuku Village, is known locally as the tomb of Gihon's queen.

== Traditions linked to the Unajara-uhaka tomb ==
After Gihon abdicated his throne in favour of Eiso, Unajara would have left Urasoe with her children to follow her husband in exile. According to the Hanasaki family (花崎家) of Kishaba, said to descend directly from Gihon and Unajara, they first fled into the northern part of the island, to Hedo (辺戸) (Kunigami) and then, when the political situation settled, they came back to the central part of the island, first to Senaha (瀬名波) (Yomitan) and then to Chunjun (仲順) (Kitanakagusuku), where they ended their lives peacefully under the benevolent protection of the lord of Chunjun.

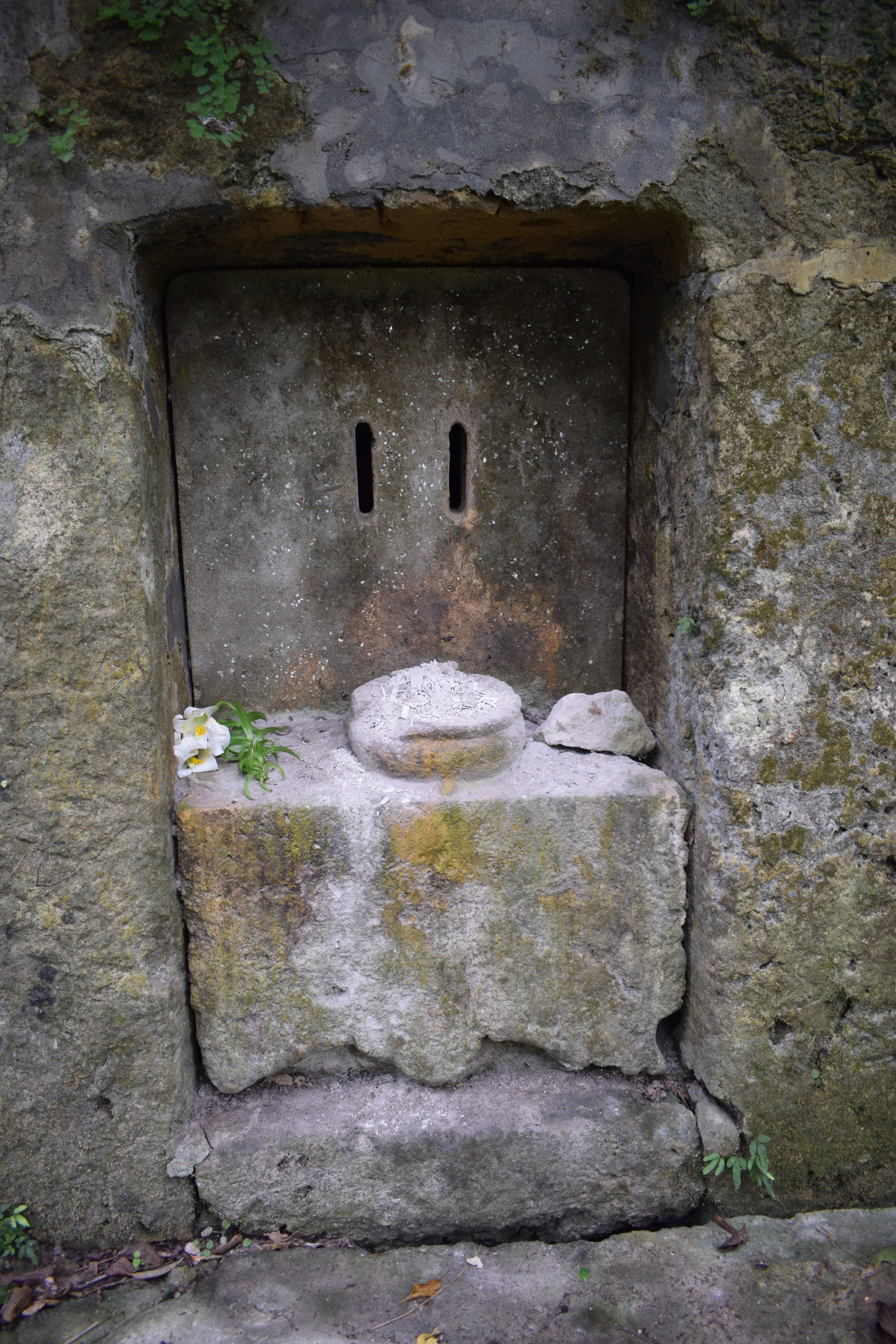
Gate and incense-burner of the Unajara-uhaka Tomb

According to the traditions recorded by the Hanasaki family, the Unajara-uhaka tomb shelters four funerary urns bearing the inscriptions "King Amachi" (天次王, Amachi-ō), "Lord Manabidaru" (真鍋樽按司, Manabidaru Aji), "Lord of the West" (西之按司加那志, Iri-nu-aji-ganashi) and "Meishō" (桜尚). Amachi-ō would be Gihon (Note: Many old tombs in and around Okinawa Island claim to be Gihon’s tomb), and it is possible that one of the three other urns belongs to Unajara., The Hanasaki family takes care of the tomb and comes and prays in front of it for Shīmī and the other yearly festivals.

== Issue ==
Unajara gave birth to at least one son and one daughter, who are mentioned in the Abridged Chronicles of the Ryūkyū Kingdom. Her son marries a woman from Ginowan named Shō Machiru (章 真鶴) who is the heroin of a legend where she tries and sacrifices herself to a dragon, and her daughter marries Machiru's younger brother, Shō Shitoku (章 思德)..
