= Okinawa Shrine =

Shinto shrine in Japan

Okinawa Jinja 沖縄神社
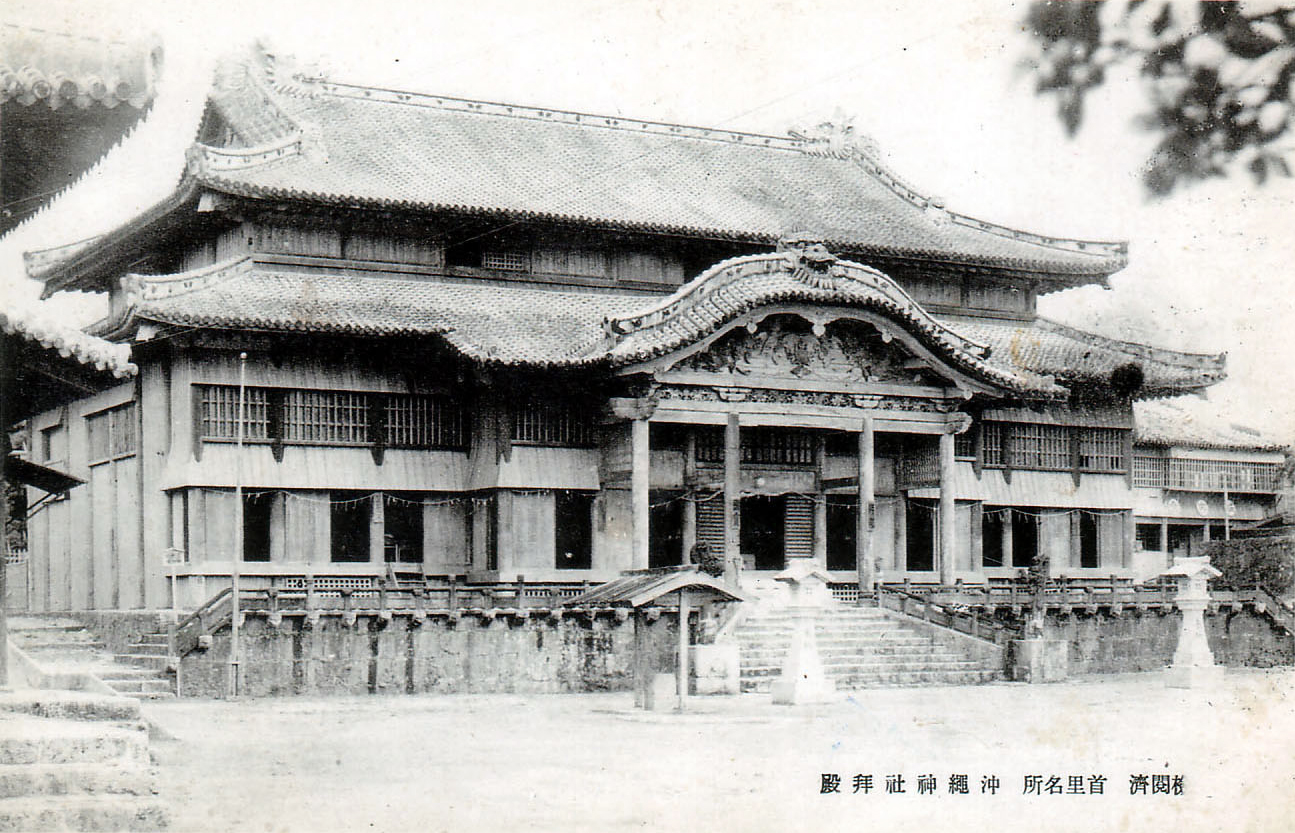
- Okinawa Shrine haiden, formerly the main hall of Shuri Castle, before the Battle of Okinawa; visible in the photo are the shrine temizuya, tōrō, shimenawa, and offering box

- Location within Japan

Religion
- Affiliation: Shinto
- Deity: Minamoto no Tametomo, Shunten, Shō En, Shō Kei, Shō Tai
- Festival: 20 October

Location
- Location: 5 Shuritorihori-chō, Naha, Okinawa Prefecture, Japan
- Coordinates: 26°13′2.61″N 127°43′51.47″E

Website
- jinjacho.naminouegu.jp/okinawajinja.html

Okinawa Shrine (沖縄神社, Okinawa Jinja) is a Shinto shrine in Naha, Okinawa Prefecture, Japan. Established at the end of the Taishō period on the site of Shuri Castle, the main hall of which was reused as the haiden (hall of worship), the shrine buildings were destroyed in May 1945 during the Battle of Okinawa. Both castle and shrine have since been rebuilt while this phase has been written out of the "official history" currently told at Shurijō Castle Park.

== Dedication ==
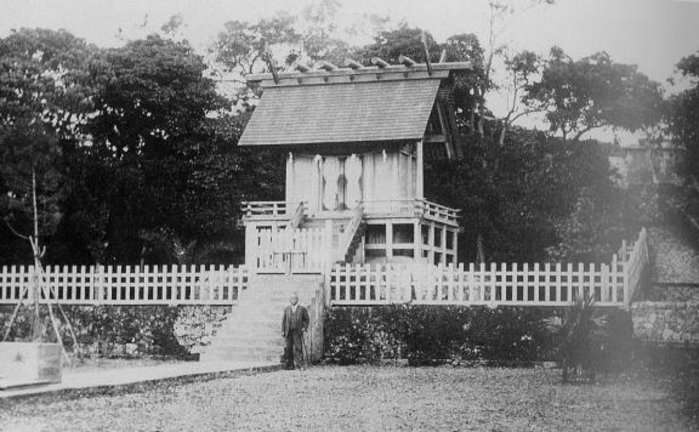
Yamasaki Masatada before the shinmei-zukuri honden in 1932/3

The shrine is dedicated to Minamoto no Tametomo, Shunten, Shō En, Shō Kei, Shō Tai. The first fought in the Hōgen Rebellion before making his way to Okinawa and siring there the future king Shunten, as told in Ryūkyū Shintō-ki and Chūzan Seikan, a tale that was exploited during the Meiji period and after to help legitimize the annexation of the kingdom and its reconfiguration first as the Ryūkyū Domain and subsequently as Okinawa Prefecture. The three Shō Dynasty kings were, respectively, the founder of the dynasty, ruler during the kingdom's golden age, and its last king.

== Background ==
In 1889, the governor of Okinawa requested the establishment of a kokuhei chūsha, not only "to cultivate the spirit of reverence and respect", but also on the grounds that this would be "invaluable in the government of the prefecture". Naminoue Shrine was proposed as the candidate. In 1910 it was proposed a new prefectural shrine (県社, kensha) be established in honour of the fiftieth anniversary of the ascension to the throne of the Meiji emperor. Four years later there were similarly unsuccessful proposals to establish a prefectural shrine in the grounds of Naminoue-gū. In 1915 the prefectural government proposed to the Home Ministry the foundation of a shrine dedicated to Shō Tai, Amamikyo and Shinerikyo; this was rejected on the grounds that the central figures of the Ryukyuan creation myth were not part of the Shinto pantheon.

== Establishment ==
In December 1922, the prefecture submitted another proposal for a prefectural shrine. With old Shuri Castle as the location, the submission was approved by the Home Ministry on 31 March 1923. The main hall of the castle, then in a state of some disrepair, was to be demolished to make way for the haiden. Despite the appeal of Higashionna Kanjun to the mayor of Shuri, work was already underway when Kamakura Yoshitarō (鎌倉芳太郎) approached Itō Chūta to help save the site. The pair visited Okinawa together before the prominent architect, a member of the Committee for the Preservation of Ancient Shrines and Temples, declaring the castle the "representative work of Ryūkyūan architecture", intervened to secure an emergency designation under the Historical Sites, Places of Scenic Beauty, and Natural Monuments Preservation Law. Demolition was halted. Itō proposed the main hall be used as the shrine haiden, thus qualifying it for funds for repair under the Ancient Temples and Shrines Preservation Law. On 24 April 1925, as "Okinawa Jinja haiden", it was designated a Specially Protected Building (National Treasure). This ostensibly benign episode of heritage preservation might also be viewed as a violent colonial "appropriation" of the palace of the Ryūkyū Kings, paradigmatic "marker of prior independence", for relocation within the "ideological universe" of State Shinto and service of the "emperor-centred Japanese nation state".

== After 1945 ==
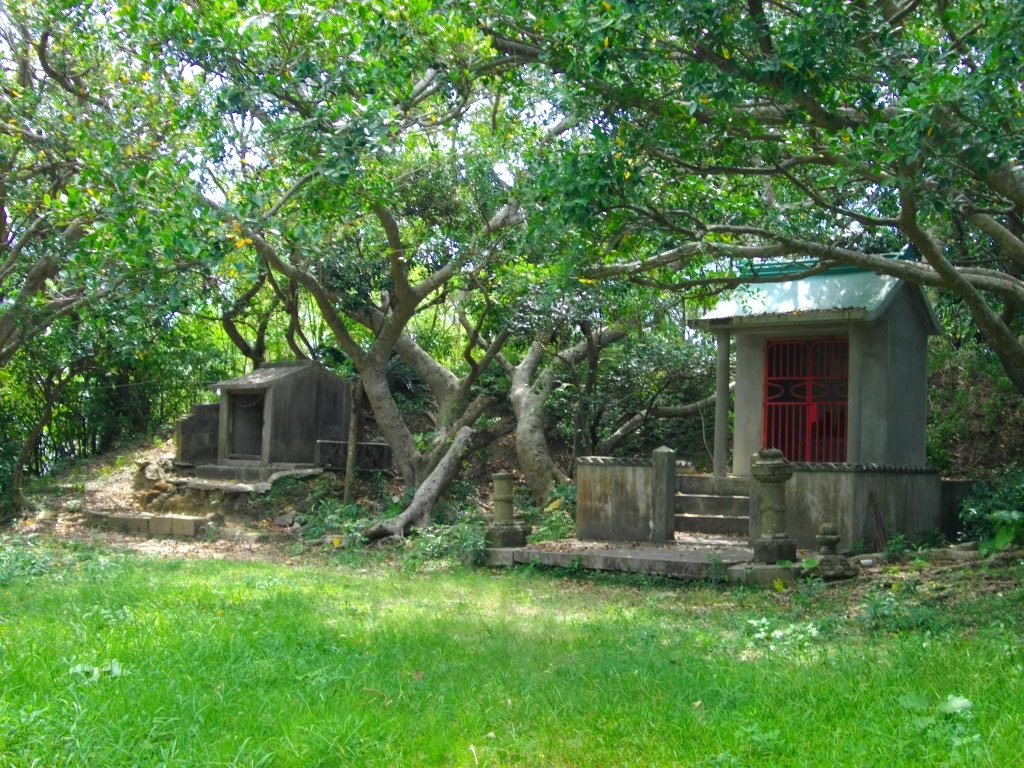
Okinawa Shrine on 11 September 2009

The shrine and most of the rest of the castle were destroyed during the Battle of Okinawa, and five years later, the University of the Ryukyus was established on the former castle site in May 1950. Under United States Civil Administration of the Ryukyu Islands Proclamation 16 (USCAR 16) of 1952, concerning land with uncertain ownership, the shrine grounds were transferred to the administration of Shuri City, which two years later was merged into Naha. In 1960, a proposal to rebuild the shrine on a plot to the east of the former castle main hall was vetoed by the University. The following year a temporary shrine was erected by the entrance to Bengadake, construction work continuing into 1962. In 1969 a tenancy agreement for the land occupied by the temporary shrine was agreed with Naha City by the Association for the Realization of the Reconstruction of Okinawa Shrine. As of 2016, Okinawa Shrine is one of eleven shrines overseen by the Okinawa Prefecture Shrine Agency, a branch of the Association of Shinto Shrines.

== See also ==
- Chōsen Jingū
- Taiwan Shrine
- Ryūkyū Kingdom
- List of Cultural Properties of Japan - structures (Okinawa)
