= Shunten =

Legendary Okinawan king (c. 1165 – 1237)

Shunten 舜天
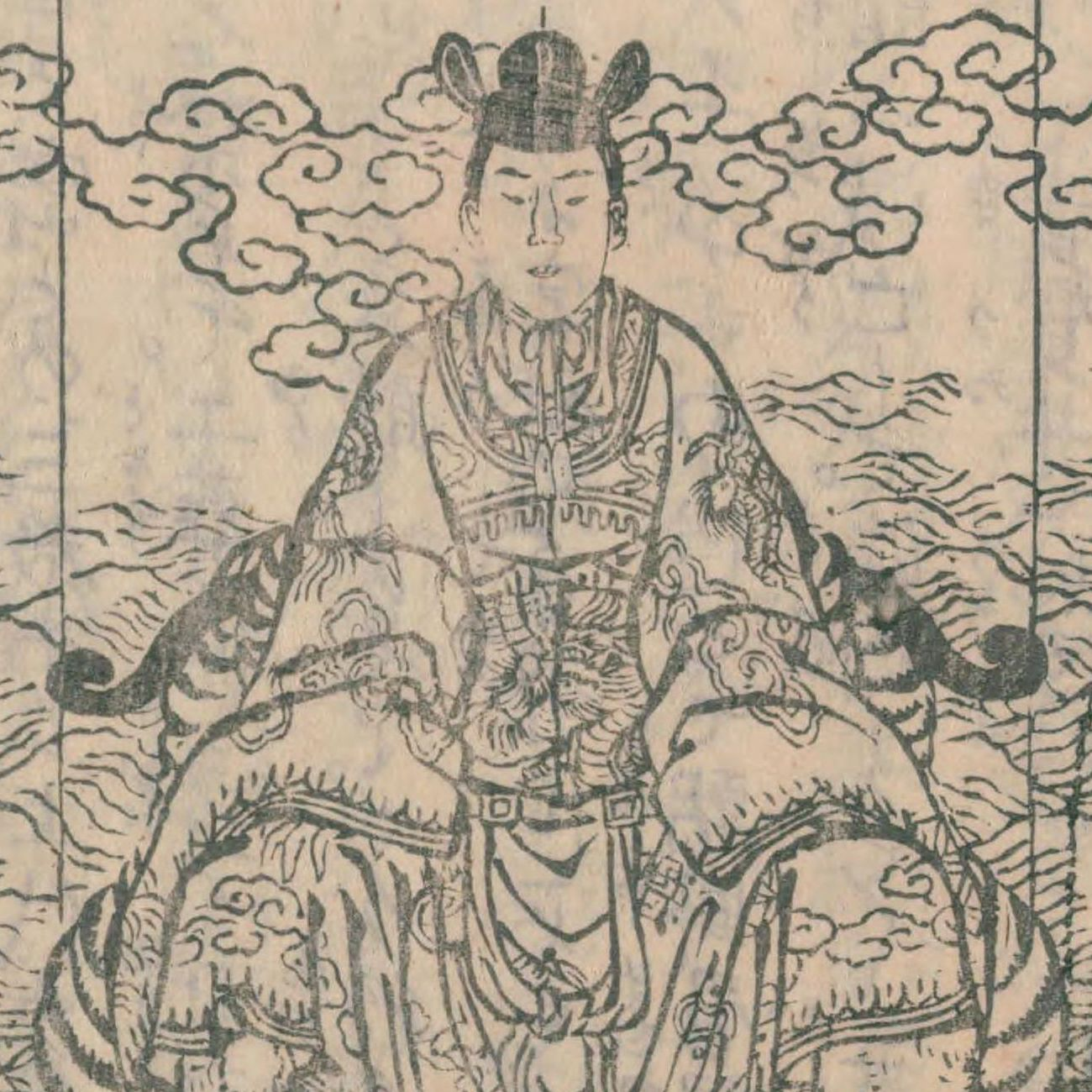
- 19th-century depiction of Shunten's enthronement

King of Chūzan (legendary)
- Reign: 1187–1237
- Successor: Shunbajunki
- Born: c. 1165; Urasoe, Okinawa
- Died: 1237 (aged 70–71)
- Burial: Urasoe yōdore
- Issue: Shunbajunki
- Divine name: Sonton (尊敦)
- House: Shunten dynasty
- Father: Minamoto no Tametomo
- Mother: sister of the aji of Ōzato

Shunten (舜天, traditionally dated c. 1165 – 1237) was the legendary first king of Chūzan and a ruler of Okinawa. The official histories of the Ryukyu Kingdom claim that he was the son of the samurai Minamoto no Tametomo and a local noblewoman during his exile following the Hōgen rebellion. He became the aji of Urasoe at age 15. Seven years later, he led a popular revolt against Riyū, who had usurped the throne of the ancient and mythical Tenson dynasty. He gained recognition as the overlord of all Okinawan chieftains, ruling from Urasoe Castle until his death in 1237. He inaugurated the Shunten dynasty, which lasted until 1260, when his grandson Gihon disappeared.

The mythology surrounding Shunten and Tametomo likely spread to Okinawa from Kyushu folklore around 1400. It was recorded in both Ryukyuan and Japanese histories by the 1500s and 1600s. His descent from Tametomo was used to justify the Satsuma Domain's invasion of Ryukyu in 1609; by the early 20th century, it was used to justify the 1879 Japanese annexation of the Ryukyu Kingdom. No evidence exists to authenticate Shunten or his unification of Okinawa, which was historically unified by the end of the 15th century.

== Narrative ==
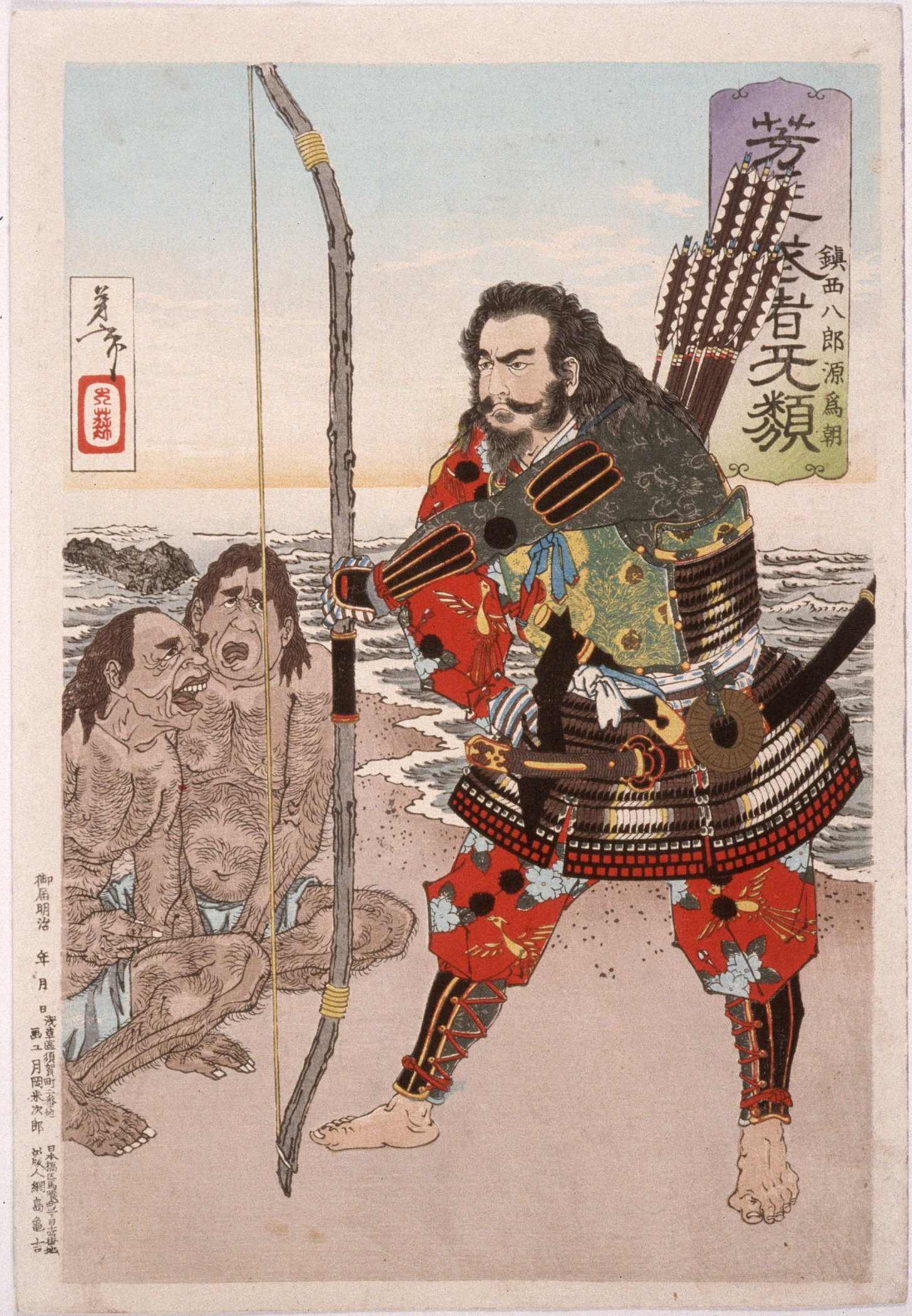
19th-century depiction of Minamoto no Tametomo, Shunten's supposed father

The official histories of the Ryukyu Kingdom name Shunten as the first monarch of Chūzan, with the Chūzan Seikan (lit. 'Reflections on Chūzan') containing the most detailed account of his origins and reign. The histories claim that Shunten was born around 1165 as the son of the Japanese samurai Minamoto no Tametomo (1139–1170). Tametomo, a historical figure from Kyushu who fought in the Hōgen rebellion during the late Heian period, was exiled to Izu Province after participating in the Minamoto clan's failed assault on the Taira-held city of Kyoto. The Ryukyuan histories claim that Tametomo travelled to Okinawa, either in exile or due to being blown off-course in a storm. He greatly impressed the inhabitants, and briefly ruled over the island; the chief of Ōzato married his daughter to Tametomo, who bore his son Shunten around 1165. Shortly after Shunten's birth, Tametomo left his family to return to fight in Japan, where he committed suicide after his defeat in battle.

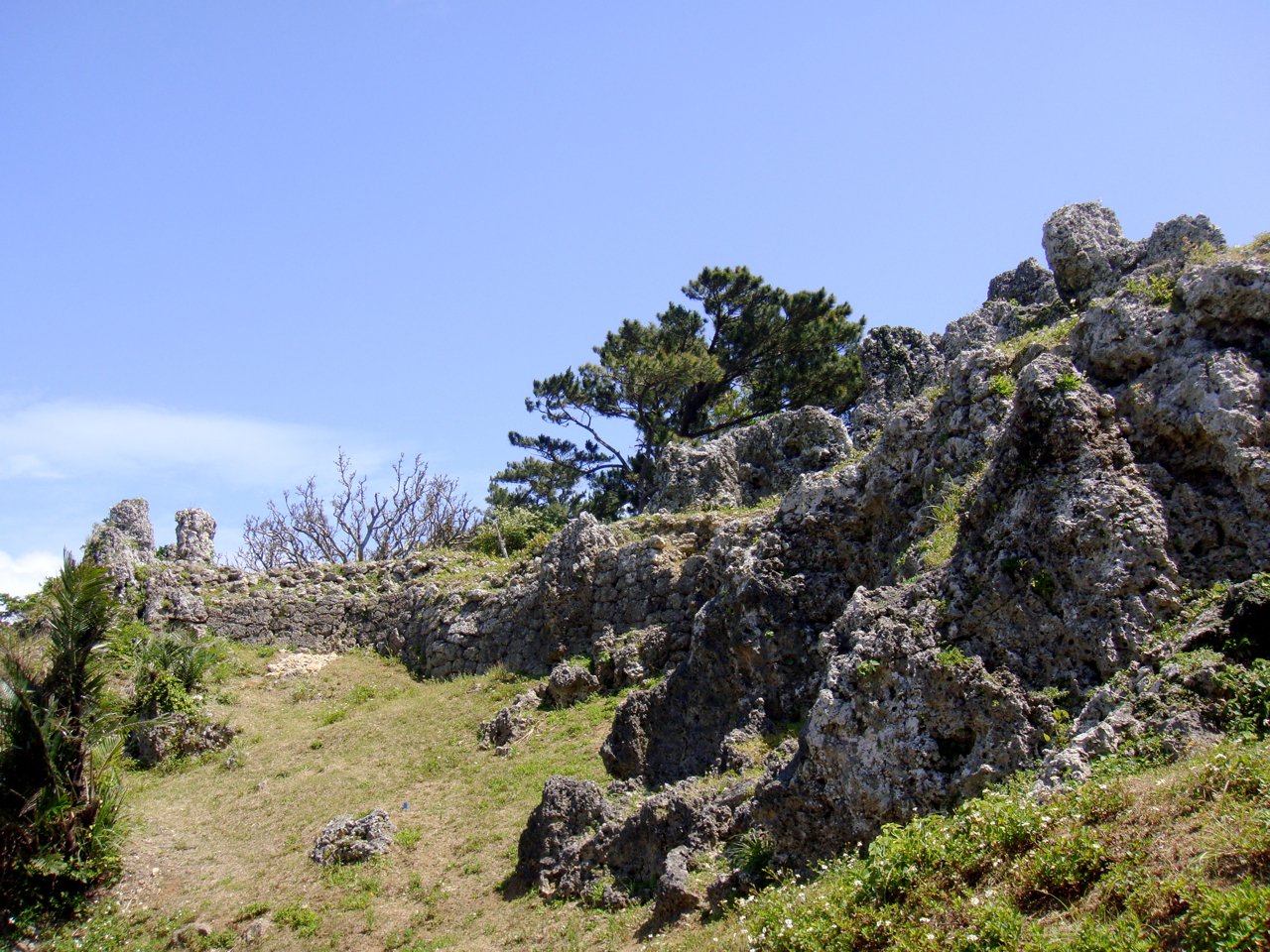
The ruins of Urasoe Castle, traditionally ascribed as Shunten's residence

Following Tametomo's return to Japan, Shunten and his mother settled in Urasoe. He became recognized as a talented leader during his youth, and was chosen to succeed his grandfather as the anji of Urasoe when he was 15 years old. The 24th king of the divine Tenson dynasty, which was said to have ruled over the area for 17,000 years, had become decadent and was overthrown by his retainer Riyū in 1186. Shunten led a popular revolt against Riyū the following year, and became recognized as the overlord of all of Okinawa's anji. He was said to rule from Urasoe Castle, which was later the residence of Eiso and Satto.

Shunten was a popular and effective ruler who supported the well-being of the general populace. He reigned for 51 years until his death in 1237, when he was succeeded by his son Shunbajunki. He was said to be entombed at Urasoe yōdore and enshrined at Naminoue Shrine. The 18th century Ryukyuan history Chūzan Seifu gives him the divine name Sonton (尊敦).

The Shunten dynasty's rule of the island would end under the reign of Shunten's grandson Gihon, who was said to have appointed the aji Eiso as regent and vanished into the forest around 1260. No historical evidence exists for Shunten's existence. He was almost certainly a fictional ruler of Okinawa, which would not be unified until the end of the 15th century.

== Historiography ==
The Tametomo narrative likely emerged from folk stories attested in southern and western Kyushu, spreading to Okinawa by around 1400. It appears in the Omoro sōshi, a collection of Okinawan folk songs and chants first compiled in the early 1500s. The Omoro claim that Shō Shin, an early king of the unified Ryukyu Kingdom from the Second Shō Dynasty, was descended from this dynasty. The narrative was spread back to Japan by Ryuykuan envoys in the late 1520s, including the Buddhist priest Gesshū Jukei. He wrote down the narrative, which was spread among Gozan Zen priests over the following decades. The Satsuma Domain launched the invasion of Ryukyu in 1609; Shunten's ancestry in Kyushu was used to justify the invasion by Nanpō Bunshi in his Verses and Preface on the Chastisement of Ryukyu.

Edo period novelist Takizawa Bakin's Chinsetsu Yumiharizuki popularized the Tametomo legend throughout Japan and strongly influenced Japanese perspectives on the Ryukyus. During the Meiji and Taishō era, history textbooks reported Tametomo's journey to Okinawa and Shunten's unification of the island as historical. Historian Taira Shidehara described it as "indisputable fact" in 1899, while Shiga Shigetaka supported the Shō dynasty's genealogical links to Shunten and Tametomo in a 1904 geography textbook.

Katō Sango (1865–1939) published a scholarly critique of the narrative in 1906, describing it as a hoax created by Shō Shōken in the Chūzan Seikan. This was strongly opposed by historian Kikuchi Yūhō in his 1908 Ryūkyū to Tametomo; he described various locations and artifacts traditionally associated with Shunten and Tametomo, arguing that the legend was kept alive through a tradition of ancestor worship, and that the Japanese origins of the kingdom justified its 1879 annexation. In 1922, the Home Ministry authorized the creation of the Shinto Okinawa Shrine on the grounds of Shuri Castle. In lieu of local deities, the shrine was dedicated to Tametomo, Shunten, and Shō Tai, the last king of Ryukyu.

Historian Zenchū Nakahara, writing primarily in the 1950s, rejected the historicity of Shunten, noting that he is never mentioned by name in the Omoro. Nakahara theorized that his name is derived from Japanese suiden, meaning "flooded paddy". In 2020, Yoshinari Naoki theorized that the Shunten legend represented a memory of groups of Japanese traders on Kikaijima who moved southward to Okinawa after its invasion by the forces of Minamoto no Yoritomo in 1188. This date is nearly identical to the 1187 date given for Shunten's unification of the island.

Preceded by —	King of Chūzan; 1187–1237	Succeeded by Shunbajunki
