= Cape Hedo =

Cape on Okinawa Island, Japan

Cape Hedo 辺戸岬 Hedo-misaki
- Cape
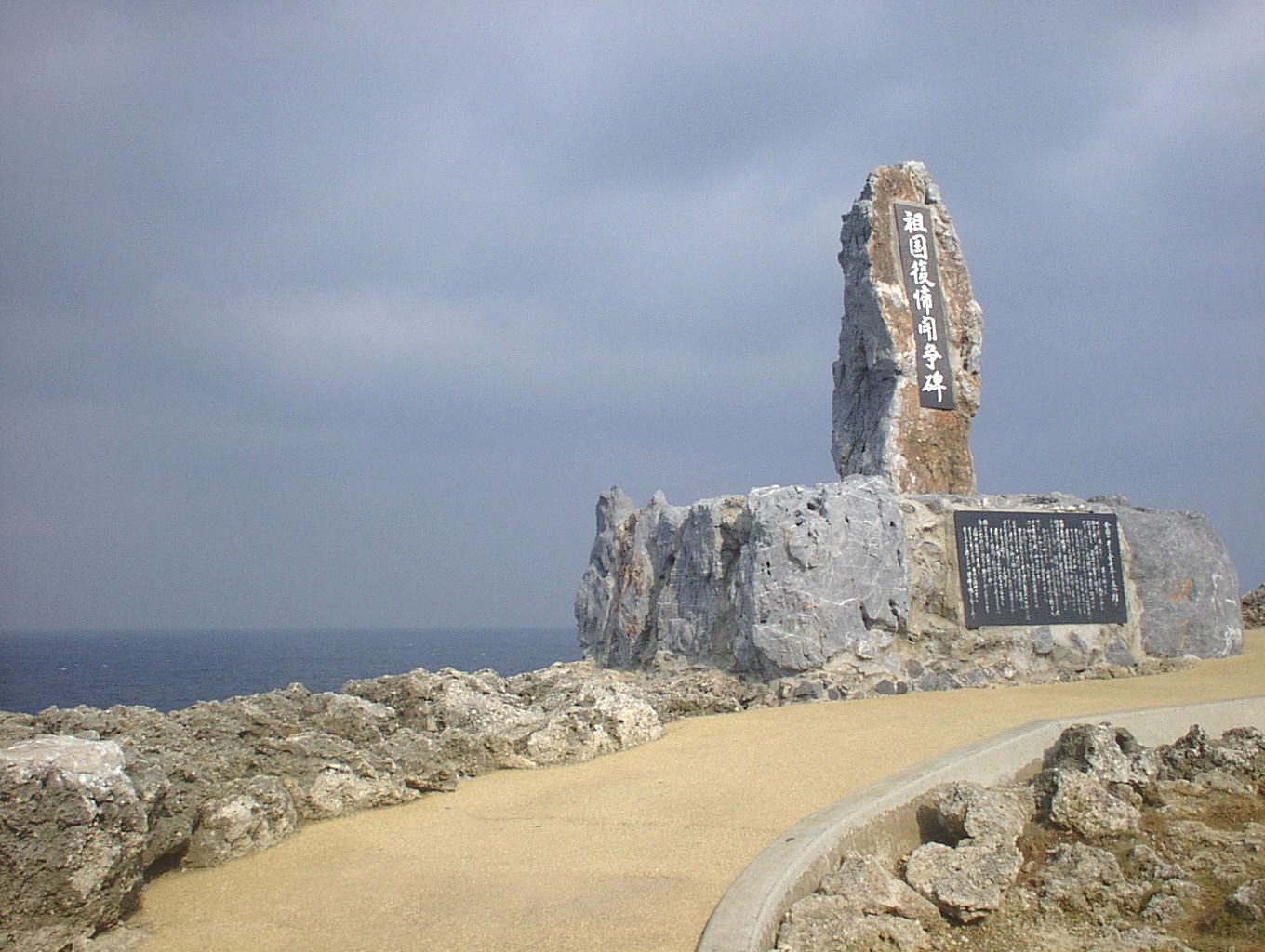
- Monument in Commemoration of the Reversion of Okinawa to Japan, erected 1972
- Interactive map of Cape Hedo
- Coordinates: 26°52′23.71″N 128°15′52.98″E
- Location: Japan
- Water bodies: East China Sea, Pacific Ocean

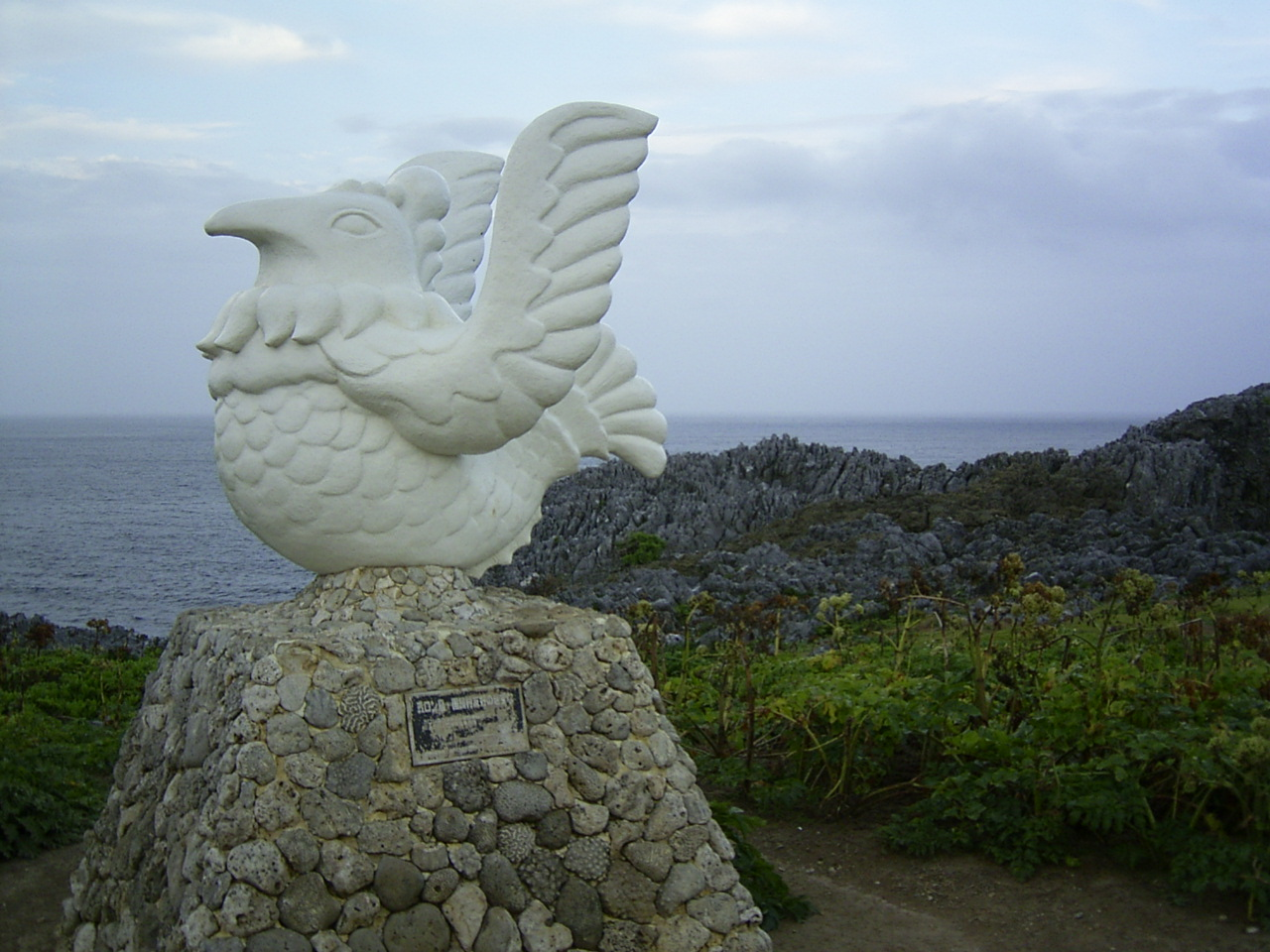
Monument in honor of Friendship between Kunigami Village and Yoronjima.

Cape Hedo (辺戸岬, Hedo-misaki; Okinawan: Fidu-misachi ,Kunigami:Pidu-sacii), also known as Hedo Point, is the northernmost point on Okinawa Island, located within Kunigami Village. A cape jutting out north from the island, it faces the East China Sea on the west, and the Pacific Ocean on the east. On a particularly clear day, the island of Yoron (Yoronjima) in Kagoshima Prefecture can be seen on the horizon. Yoron Island is located approximately 23 kilometres (14 mi) to the north.

Cape Hedo is part of Okinawa Dai Sekirinzan Quasi-National Park, a prefectural park established in 1965 and re-established with the reversion of Okinawa to Japan in 1972.

In the Shōhō Kuniezu, a kuniezu, or series of Japanese provincial land maps created during the Edo period (1603 – 1868), Cape Hedo appears as "Heto misaki", or "Cape Heto". The expedition of Commodore Perry (1794 – 1858) visited Cape Hedo and recorded it as "Cape Hope" in his Narrative of the Expedition of an American Squadron to the China Seas and Japan. The Nihon Suiroshi, a pilot guide first issued in 1892, records that the cape is also known as Cape Kunigami and is commonly used as a nautical landmark.

The site has become a tourist destination, both for its location, and for the monument erected there commemorating the end of US Occupation and return of Okinawa to Japanese sovereignty. The monument is popularly seen as a photo opportunity by tourists; as tourism to the site has grown, a number of restaurants, souvenir shops, and other tourist facilities have appeared near the site.

According to legends of Okinawan history, Okinawan king Gihon (r. c. 1248–1260) fled the capital after abdicating the throne and disappeared into the forest. He is said to have last been seen at the cliffs of Hedo Point (Hedo-misaki), the northernmost point on Okinawa Island.

== See also ==
Tourism in Japan
