= List of Tangible Folk Cultural Properties of Japan (Okinawa) =

This list is of the Tangible Folk Cultural Properties of Japan in the Prefecture of Okinawa.

== National Tangible Folk Cultural Properties ==
As of 1 January 2015, zero properties have been designated at a national level.

== Prefectural Tangible Folk Cultural Properties ==
As of 1 May 2014, nineteen properties have been designated at a prefectural level.

Property	Municipality	Ownership	Comments	Image	Coordinates	Ref.
Nago City Gabusoka Raised Storehouse 名護市我部祖河の高倉; Nago-shi Gabusoka no takakura	Nago	private			26°37′19″N 128°00′05″E	for all refs see
Awa no Kubo Utaki 安和のくばのうたき; Awa no Kubo utaki	Nago	Awa District			26°36′42″N 127°55′48″E	
Tomori Large Stone Lion 富盛の石彫大獅子; Tomori no sekichō ō jishi	Yaese	Tomori District			26°08′01″N 127°43′28″E	
Iheya Village Gakiya Kami-Ashiage 伊平屋村我喜屋の神あしあげ; Iheya-son Gakiya no kami ashiage	Iheya	Gakiya District			27°01′59″N 127°57′45″E	
Iheya Village Shimajiri Kami-Ashiage 伊平屋村島尻の神あしあげ; Iheya-son Shimajiri no kami ashiage	Iheya	Shimajiri District			27°01′04″N 127°56′36″E	
Kisama Utaki 喜佐真御嶽; Kisama utaki	Miyakojima	Miyakojima City			24°45′29″N 125°17′16″E	
Toguchi no Tera 渡口のテラ; Toguchi no tera	Kitanakagusuku	Toguchi District			26°18′12″N 127°48′40″E	
Gusukube Tomori Amaga 城辺町の友利のあま井; Gusukube-chō no Tomori no amagaa	Miyakojima	Miyakojima City	cave spring		24°43′36″N 125°21′16″E	
Uipyāmutō Sanctuary ウイピャームトゥの祭場; Uipyāmutō no saijō	Miyakojima	Miyakojima City			24°43′35″N 125°21′05″E	
Izena Village Shomi Kami-Asagi and Uganju 伊是名村諸見の神アサギ附拝所; Izena-son Shomi no kami asagi tsuketari haisho	Izena	Izena Village			26°55′57″N 127°56′54″E	
Izena Village Nakada Kami-Asagi and Residence 伊是名村仲田の神アサギ附宅地; Izena-son Nakada no kami asagi tsuketari takuchi	Izena	Nakada District			26°55′30″N 127°56′56″E	
Izena Village Izena Kami-Asagi and Uganju 伊是名村伊是名の神アサギ附拝所; Izena-son Izena no kami asagi tsuketari haisho	Izena	Izena Village			26°54′57″N 127°56′05″E	
Izena Village Serikyaku Kami-Asagi and Residence 伊是名村勢理客の神アサギ附宅地; Izena-son Serikyaku no kami asagi tsuketari takuchi	Izena	Izena Village			26°55′59″N 127°55′36″E	
Asato no Tera 安里のテラ; Asato no tera	Nakagusuku	private			26°15′27″N 127°47′24″E	
Ishigaki Tonoshiro Banner Book 石垣四箇村 登野城の旗頭本; Ishigaki shikamura Tonoshiro no hata kajira bon	Ishigaki	association (kept at the Ishigaki City Yaeyama Museum)	1 volume		24°20′17″N 124°09′34″E	
Ishigaki Ōgawa Banner Books 石垣四箇村 大川の旗頭本; Ishigaki shikamura Ōgawa no hata kajira bon	Ishigaki	association (kept at the Ishigaki City Yaeyama Museum)	3 volumes		24°20′17″N 124°09′34″E	
Ishigaki Ishigaki Banner Book 石垣四箇村 石垣の旗頭本; Ishigaki shikamura Ishigaki no hata kajira bon	Ishigaki	association (kept at the Ishigaki City Yaeyama Museum)	1 volume		24°20′17″N 124°09′34″E	
Ishigaki Arakawa Banner Books 石垣四箇村 新川の旗頭本; Ishigaki shikamura Arakawa no hata kajira bon	Ishigaki	association (kept at the Ishigaki City Yaeyama Museum)	5 volumes		24°20′17″N 124°09′34″E	
Tōme and Kogusuku Funerary Equipment 当銘・小城の共有龕及び付属葬具一式; Tōme・Kogusuku no kyōyū gan oyobi fuzoku sōgu isshiki	Yaese	Tōme and Kogusuku			26°09′14″N 127°42′01″E	

== Municipal Tangible Folk Cultural Properties ==
As of 1 May 2014, a further one hundred and fourteen properties have been designated at a municipal level.

Property	Municipality	Ownership	Comments	Image	Coordinates	Ref.
Shoshi Paper Furnace 諸志の焚字炉; Shoshi no funjiro	Nakijin	Nakijin Village			26°41′47″N 127°56′34″E	for all refs see
Sakiyama Kami-Asagi 崎山の神ハザギ; Sakiyama no kami hazagi	Nakijin	Sakiyama District			26°41′58″N 127°57′33″E	
Sesoko Noro Kanzashi and Magatama 瀬底祝女の簪と勾玉; Sesoko Noro Kanzashi and Magatama	Motobu	private			26°36′28″N 127°59′26″E	
Sesoko Toteikun 瀬底の土帝君; Sesoko toteikun	Motobu	private	on Sesoko Island (瀬底島)		26°38′41″N 127°51′56″E	
Gushiken Kami-Asagi 具志堅の神ハサーギ; Gushiken no kami hazagi	Motobu	Gushiken District			26°41′57″N 127°54′51″E	
Kushi Kannondō 久志の観音堂; Kushi no Kannondō	Nago	Kushi District			26°30′55″N 128°00′43″E	
Survey Stones at Nago Museum 名護博物館収蔵のハル石; Nago hakubutsukan shūzō no haru ishi	Nago	Nago Museum			26°35′10″N 127°59′13″E	
Gabe Funerary Equipment 我部の葬具一式; Gabe no sōgu isshiki	Nago	Nago Museum			26°35′10″N 127°59′13″E	
Pitō Hunting and Fishing Tools ピトゥ狩漁具; Pitō shugyo gu	Nago	Nago Museum			26°35′10″N 127°59′13″E	
Jana Gusuku Raised Storehouse 謝名城の高倉; Jana Gusuku takakura	Nago	Nago Museum			26°35′10″N 127°59′13″E	
Teniya Ukka River Bijuru 天仁屋ウッカーヌビジュル; Teniya Ukkā nu bijuru	Nago	Teniya District			26°34′07″N 128°08′07″E	
Hamasaki Utaki 浜崎御嶽; Hamasaki utaki	Onna	Onna District			26°29′57″N 127°51′29″E	
Kanjagaa カンジャガー; Kanjagaa	Onna	Onna District	well		26°29′55″N 127°51′02″E	
Udōigama ウドゥイガマ; Udōigama	Onna	Onna District	cave near Cape Manza (万座毛)		26°30′07″N 127°50′40″E	
Former Kochiya Village Kumi Odori Texts 旧古知屋村(現松田区)組踊写本6冊 kyū-Kochiya-son (gen-Matsuda-ku) Kumi Odori shahon 6-satsu	Ginoza	Matsuda District	6 volumes		26°29′29″N 127°59′34″E	
Magatama, Kanzashi, and Old Documents 勾玉・簪・古文書 magatama・kanzashi・komonjo	Kin	local association			26°27′17″N 127°55′24″E	
Yaka Ufukaa 屋嘉のウフカー; Yaka no ufukaa	Kin	Yaka District	well		26°27′11″N 127°51′16″E	
Yaka Costumes 屋嘉の芸能衣装; Yaka no geinō ishō	Kin	Yaka District			26°27′06″N 127°51′01″E	

== Registered Tangible Folk Cultural Properties ==
As of 1 January 2015, one property has been registered (as opposed to designated) at a national level.

Property	Municipality	Ownership	Comments	Image	Coordinates	Ref.
Tools for Life on Taketomi Island 竹富島の生活用具; Taketomi-jima no seikatsu yō gu	Taketomi	Kihō-in (喜宝院) (kept at the Kihōin Shūshūkan (喜宝院蒐集館))	842 items		24°19′54″N 124°05′03″E	

== See also ==
- Cultural Properties of Japan
- List of Important Tangible Folk Cultural Properties
- Shisa
- Mingei
