= Shunten dynasty =

Second dynasty of Okinawa Island

The Shunten dynasty (舜天王統) was the second dynasty in the traditional historiography of Okinawa Island. It was established by Shunten in 1187. According to Chūzan Seikan, Shunten's mother was a daughter of the aji, or local chieftain, of Ōzato; his father, Minamoto no Tametomo, was an adventurer from Japan. Prior to becoming king, Shunten was the lord of Urasoe. At that time, Okinawa Island was in great confusion; the last overlord of Tenson dynasty was assassinated by the powerful official named Riyū (利勇), whom promoted himself as paramount chief. Shunten revolted against Riyū and overthrew him. In 1187, Shunten was recognized as the new "king". overlord among aji. Though commonly called the "kings", the Okinawan rulers at that time should be more accurately identified as paramount chiefs, or overlords among aji during the Gusuku period.

George H. Kerr suggested that the stories of Shunten and Eiso dynasties "reflect the increasing penetration of Japanese influence" among Ryukyu Islands.

The Shunten dynasty had three kings, lasted from 1187 to 1259. The last king Gihon was forced to abdicate to his regent, Eiso, whom established the Eiso dynasty.

== List of rulers ==
Name	Kanji	Divine name	Reign	Age at death
Shunten	舜天	Sonton 尊敦	1187–1237	71
Shunbajunki	舜馬順煕	Sonomasu 其益 or Sonomasumi 其益美	1238–1248	63
Gihon	義本	Unknown	1249–1259	?
