= Naminoue Shrine =

Shinto shrine in Naha, Okinawa Prefecture

Naminoue-gū 波上宮
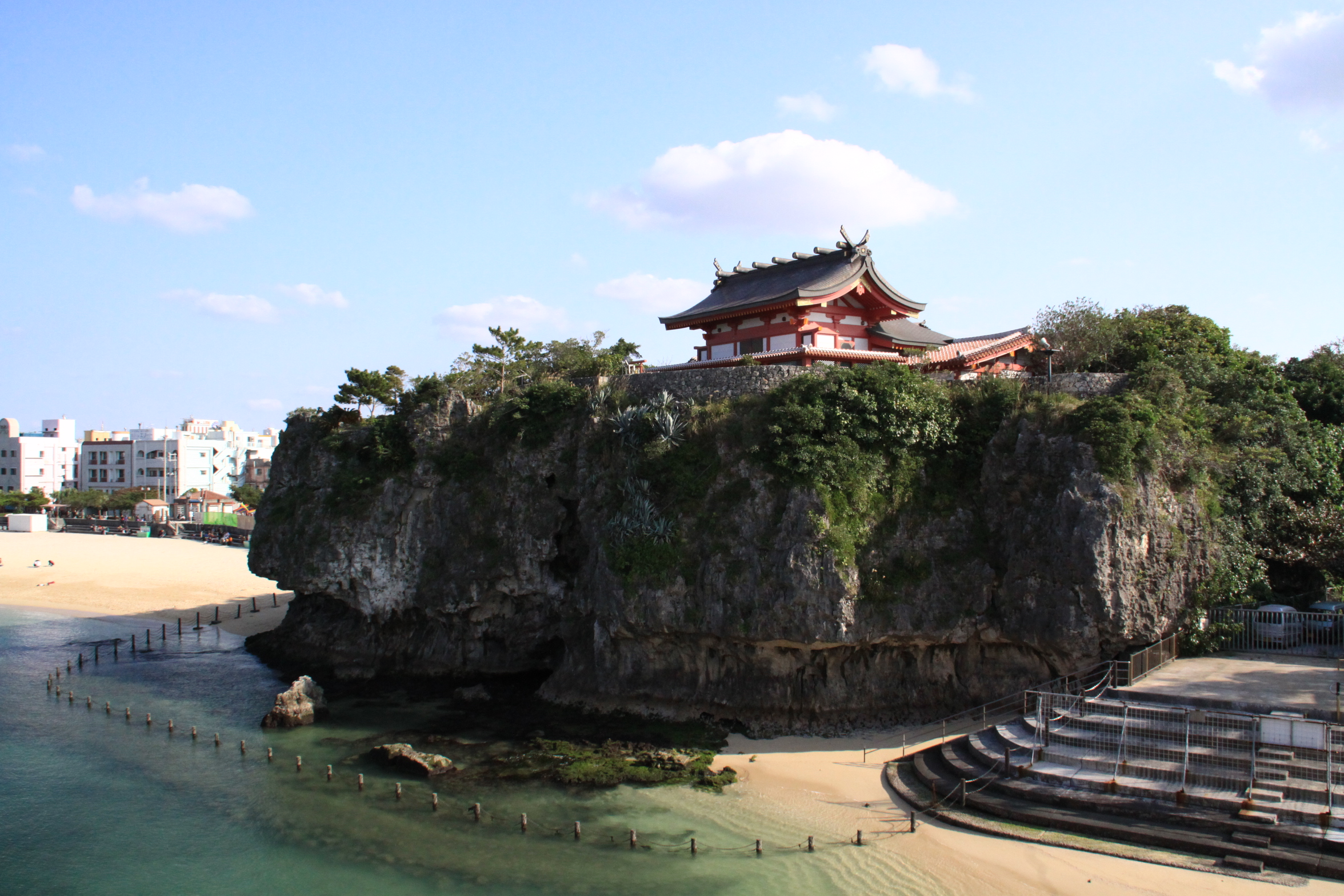

- Location within Japan

Religion
- Affiliation: Shinto, Ryukyuan religion
- Deity: Izanami, Hayatama, Kotosaka

Location
- Location: Wakasa, Naha, Okinawa
- Interactive map of Naminoue-gū 波上宮
- Coordinates: 26°13′14″N 127°40′17″E

Architecture
- Established: 1890 (as a registered official Shinto shrine)

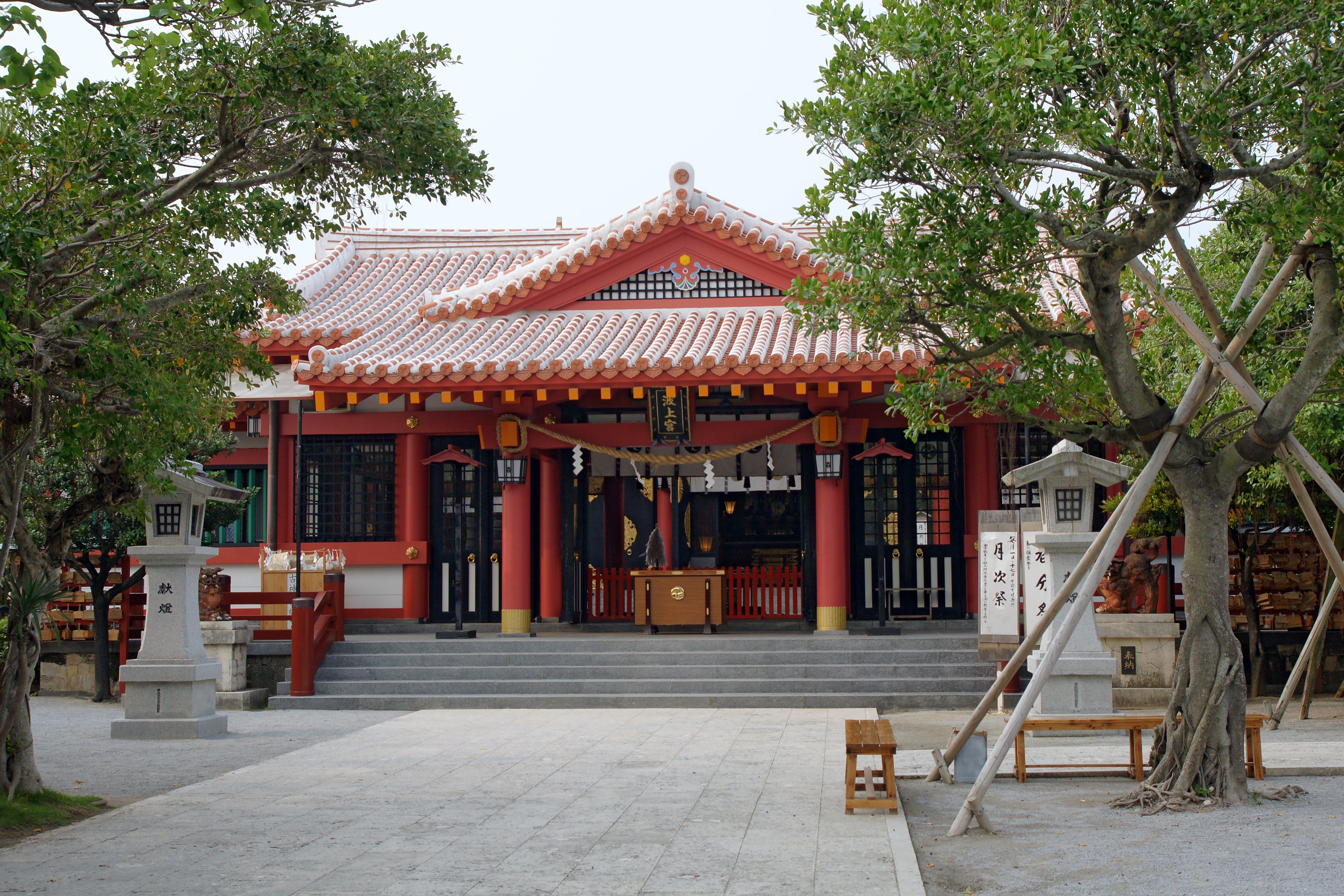
The haiden, or main prayer hall.

Naminoue Shrine (Japanese: 波上宮, Hepburn: Naminoue-gū; Okinawan: Nanmin-guu) is a Shinto shrine in Naha, Okinawa Prefecture, Japan, the ichinomiya (primary shrine) of the prefecture. It sits atop a high bluff, overlooking Naminoue Beach and the ocean.

Originally a sacred space of the native Ryukyuan religion, due to its location and natural beauty, it was dedicated to nirai kanai, the mythical source of all life, and to the sea. At some point it came to be known as Hana gusuku and Nanminsan; Nanmin is the Okinawan reading of 波上, meaning "above the waves", which is pronounced as Naminoue in Japanese.

In 1890, it was recognized in the system of State Shinto. It is among the ranked, nationally significant shrines or Kanpei-shōsha (官幣小社).

== History ==
According to legend, it was founded after a fisherman, who had come to that spot to fish everyday, caught a mysterious stone. He began to pray to it, and began to receive better hauls in his fishing; the stone glowed, and the man treasured it. However, the gods (kami) stole the stone, and the man fled. From then on, there was an oracle at that spot, until the time when it became known as Nanminsan. Other stories tell that the man was visited by an avatar of Kumano, who commanded the spiritual protection of the nation, and that, the man having related such to the royal government, the shrine was erected.

According to the historical document Ryūkyū-koku yurai-ki (琉球国由来記, "Record of the Origin of the Kingdom of Ryūkyū), a Buddhist temple was founded on the site, to be associated with the shrine, in 1367, by Raijū, a monk from Japan's Satsuma province. This was called Naminoue-san Gokoku-ji (波上山護国寺, "Temple for the Protection of the Country, Naminoue Mountain").

The shrine then came to be associated with the protection of the many ships coming and going from Naha's port, as Okinawa's trade with Korea, China, Japan, and regions to the south expanded. Prayers were made for safe journeys, and kami of the sea, navigation, and related matters were enshrined there. In addition, at the beginning of each year, the King visited the shrine and formally prayed on behalf of all the nation for good harvests and good fishing, and the peace and prosperity of the nation. Thus, Naminoue came to be the top shrine of the kingdom. It was officially recorded as such in 1605, in Ryūkyū Shintō-ki (A Record of Ryūkyū Shinto) by Taichū Shōnin, a Japanese Buddhist monk.

In 1633, the shrine was destroyed by fire; and it was re-built.

Following the Meiji Restoration, the Ryūkyū Kingdom was dissolved and formally annexed by Japan as Okinawa Prefecture. The shrine was formally established as a Shinto shrine under the Imperial Household Agency in 1890, and designated as the shrine for the protection of the tranquility of all Okinawa (沖縄総鎮守社, Okinawa sōchinshu sha). In 1924, it was officially designated the center of religious affairs on the island. Symbols of Minamoto no Tametomo, and Ryukyuan kings Shunten, Shō En, Shō Nei, and Shō Tai were enshrined there as the primary objects of worship, as part of efforts to integrate the Ryukyuan royal line into the Japanese system of nobility and Imperial authority.

During the Sino-Japanese War (1894–1895) and Russo-Japanese War (1904–1905), it was common for women to come to Naminoue to pray that their sons be deemed unfit for military service to the Japanese Empire.

The shrine was destroyed in the 1945 battle of Okinawa; the honden (main hall) and shrine office were rebuilt in 1953, as was the worship hall (haiden), eight years later. Construction of a number of other buildings, including a number of smaller shrines within the grounds, was completed in 1993.

== See also ==
- List of Shinto shrines
- Twenty-Two Shrines
- Modern system of ranked Shinto Shrines
- Geographic data related to Naminoue Shrine at OpenStreetMap
