= Chūzan Seikan =

1650 Okinawan history text

The Chūzan Seikan or Chūzan Sekan (中山世鑑, Okinawan:Chūzan shīkan; lit. "the reflect of the generations of Chūzan"), is the first official history of the Ryūkyū Kingdom, compiled by Shō Shōken Haneji Wōji Chōshū (向象賢 羽地王子朝秀) in year 7 of the Shunzhi era (1650) for king Shō Shitsu. It includes a preface and five volumes.

The king commissioned the book from his sessei and the members of the sanshikan. They gathered a team of former bureaucrats who specialised in ancient studies, and their edited researches were used to produce the book's genealogical trees. The political ideas in the text reflect those of the Shimazu clan, due to at least two of the compilers being associates of the clan. In 1638, the Shimazu clan had offered a copy of its own genealogical tree to Shō Sei Kin Wōji Chōtei, which probably served as a basis for the edition of the tree included in the history book.

The sources used for the book included engraved inscriptions (commemorative steles) found in the Ryūkyū Kingdom and texts from the Chinese empire, especially the Chronicles of the embassy to Ryūkyū (使琉球録) by Chinese ambassador Chen Kan (陳侃). The writing style shows an influence from Japanese war tales, such as the Tale of Hōgen. The preface and the general introduction of the book are written integrally in Chinese, but the preface uses a Japanese chronology. The five main volumes mix traditional Chinese characters and Japanese syllabary (katakana), but they only use Chinese era names.

== Title ==
The title of the Chūzan Seikan literally means "the reflect of the generations of Chūzan". The name of "seikan" (世鑑) comes from the maxim "inkan tookarazu" (殷鑑遠からず) that means that a government should learn from the mistakes of its direct predecessors ; the saying refers to the Shang dynasty (also referred to as the Yin (殷) dynasty), that was advised not to repeat the mistakes of its predecessors of the Xia dynasty). This title carries the hope that the book will provide the future kings with a source of reflection on the actions of their ancestors.

== Compilation methods ==
=== Editors ===
According to the preface of the Chūzan Seikan, the king Shō Shitsu ordered the book to his sessei Shō Sei Kin Wōji Chōtei (尚盛 金武 王子 朝貞) and to the members of the sanshikan Ba Kami Ōsato Uēkata Ryōan (馬加美 大里親方良安), Shō Hōgen Ginowan Uēkata Seisei (章邦彥 宜野灣親方正成) and Shō Kokuki Kunigami Uēkata Chōki (吳錫類 國頭親方重仍 / 向国噐 国頭親方朝季), (Note: Member of the Shō clan whose name was modified after the 1691 standardisation reform) who gathered a team of former bureaucrats specialised in ancient studies, whose researches and declarations were edited by Shō Shōken Haneji Wōji Chōshū to produce "genealogical trees". The political ideas of Shō Sei Kin Wōji Chōtei and of Shō Shōken Haneji Wōji Chōshū, both close to the Shimazu clan, greatly influenced the final text of the book, both in form and content.

The Shimazu clan gifted Shō Sei Kin Wōji Chōtei with a copy of its "genealogical tree" in 1638, which probably served as a basis for the edition of the Chūzan Seikan.

=== Sources ===
The text was based on engraved inscriptions (commemorative steles) found in the Ryūkyū Kingdom and on texts from the Chinese empire, especially the Chronicles of the embassy to Ryūkyū (使琉球録) by Chinese ambassador Chen Kan (陳侃) who had been sent to Ryūkyū in 1534.

The style shows an influence of Japanese war tales such as the Tale of Hōgen.

== Configuration ==
The preface and the general introduction are written integrally in Chinese, but the preface uses Japanese chronology. The five main volumes mix traditional Chinese characters and Japanese syllabary (katakana) but only use Chinese era names.

=== Volumes ===
The book includes the following volumes:

- Introduction volume: preface, genealogies of the kings of Chūzan since Shunten, genealogy since king Shō En, theory about the succession of the kings of Chūzan.
- Volume 1 – About the foundation of Ryūkyū, the Tenson dynasty, the Shunten dynasty
- Volume 2 – The Eiso dynasty, the Satto dynasty
- Volume 3 – The dynasty of Shō Hashi
- Volume 4 – The dynasty of Shō En (Shō En, Shō Sen'i)
- Volume 5 – The time of Shō Sei from the dynasty of Shō En

=== Contents ===
The Chūzan Seikan deals with events starting at the founding myths of Ryūkyū and ending at the fourth king of the second Shō dynasty, Shō Sei (r. 1527-1555), omitting the events that occurred during the reign of the king before Shō Sei, Shō Shin (r. 1477-1526). It also describes in great details the location of the thirty-six islands included in the Ryūkyū Kingdom.

As a whole, the books lacks stylistic unity. The last volume about Shō Sei's reign is more an agglomeration of quotes from diverse sources than a text properly edited. The style of the other volumes is very inspired from battle tales from Japanese literature: the succession of battle tales (Nanzan, Chūzan and Hokuzan conquest by Shō Hashi in volume 3, Shō Toku's expedition to Kikai in volume 3 and the expedition to Amami in volume 5) is a characteristic feature of this type of tales, such as can be seen in the Tale of Hōgen, the Tale of Heiji or the Taiheiki, and the text even uses the same vocabulary.

Many legends are mixed with the historical tales:

- Volume 1 mixes a Japanese legend concerning the coming of the warrior Minamoto no Tametomo to Ryūkyū and the personal history of king Shunten, presenting Shunten as the son of Minamoto no Tametomo.
- Volume 2 mixes the "universal legend" of the heavenly maiden whose feathered dress is hidden and a "legend of the charcoal burner" in which a poor man finds out his fields are full of gold and distributes his new wealth to poor people around him in order to depict the origin and life of king Satto.
- In Volume 4, the way king Shō En, before he becomes king, is obliged to fly his island of Izena is similar to the legend related to the founding ancestor of the first Shō dynasty, Samekawa Ufunushi.

== Posterity ==
As a history book, the Chūzan Seikan shows many flaws, but it determines the bases for all the history books written afterwards in the kingdom, which makes it a fundamental text.

It also gives a quite direct idea of the political ideology of the principal editors Shō Sei Kin Wōji Chōtei and Shō Shōken Haneji Wōji Chōshū, both close to the Shimazu Clan.

The foundation myths and the fact king Shunten is presented as the son of Minamoto no Tametomo will be taken up in all the other official histories written afterward.

The Chūzan Seifu, written in Chinese characters by Sai Taku Shitahaku Uēkata Tenshō (蔡鐸 志多伯親方天将) in 1701, uses the Chūzan Seikan as one of its sources and fills its gaps. It will be completed in 1725 by Sai Taku's son, Sai On Gushichan Uēkata Bunjaku (蔡温 具志頭親方文若), who will add many details concerning the Ryūkyū Kingdom collected directly in Chinese chronicles.

The interest for history of the royal government does not stop at the publication of this book, since it orders all noble families to compile their own family histories, that are nowadays important historical documents (creation of the "Office of the Genealogies" in 1689).

The influence of the Chūzan Seikan is not limited to ryūkyūan historical publications, since the foundation myths of Ryūkyū and the visit of Minamoto no Tametomo to Ryūkyū are also used as the basis of the Japanese novel Chinsetsu yumiharizuki (椿説弓張月) published by Kyokutei Bakin between 1807 and 1811

== Preserved copies ==
An original copy that had been stolen during the Second World War was returned to the government of the Ryūkyū Islands in 1953, with two copies of the Chūzan Seifu. It is kept at the Okinawa Prefectural Museum and was designated as national important cultural properties in 2020.

An original copy is also conserved at the Library of the Cabinet of the National Archives of Japan (国立公文書館内閣文庫). More recent copies exist in the Shō family archives and at the Iwase Bunko Library.

The Chūzan Seikan is among the documents that were published in 1962 in the Collection of historical documents from Ryūkyū (琉球史料叢書).

== See also ==
- List of Cultural Properties of Japan - writings (Okinawa)
