= Tenson dynasty =

Dynasty of the Ryukyu Kingdom

Shuri Castle

The Tenson dynasty (天孫氏王統) was the first dynasty in the traditional historiography of the Ryukyu Islands. According to the Ryukyuan creation myth, the Heavenly Emperor (天帝), who lived in the Heavenly Gusuku (天城), ordered Amamikyu to create the Ryukyu Islands. Without sexual intercourse, she became pregnant by a male deity, Shinerikyu, and populated the islands. Generations of mankind lived in caves and fields. At last there emerged a "heavenly child" (天帝子; tenteishi), who had three sons and two daughters: the first son became the first king, the second son became the first lord (Aji), the third son became the commoners; both daughters became the priestesses, the elder daughter became the first kikoe-ōgimi, while the younger became the first noro. The Chūzan Seikan claimed that the Tenson dynasty had twenty-five kings and ruled for seventeen thousand years. The last king was assassinated and usurped by a powerful official named Riyū (利勇), and later, Riyū was overthrown by Shunten, the lord of Urasoe, who established the Shunten dynasty in 1187.

The ruler of the Tenson dynasty was only "one line of paramount local chieftains" during the Gusuku period, and its royal authority was based on "divine right".

== See also ==
- Tenson kōrin, a similar story in Japanese mythology
