= Gihon (king) =

Gihon 義本
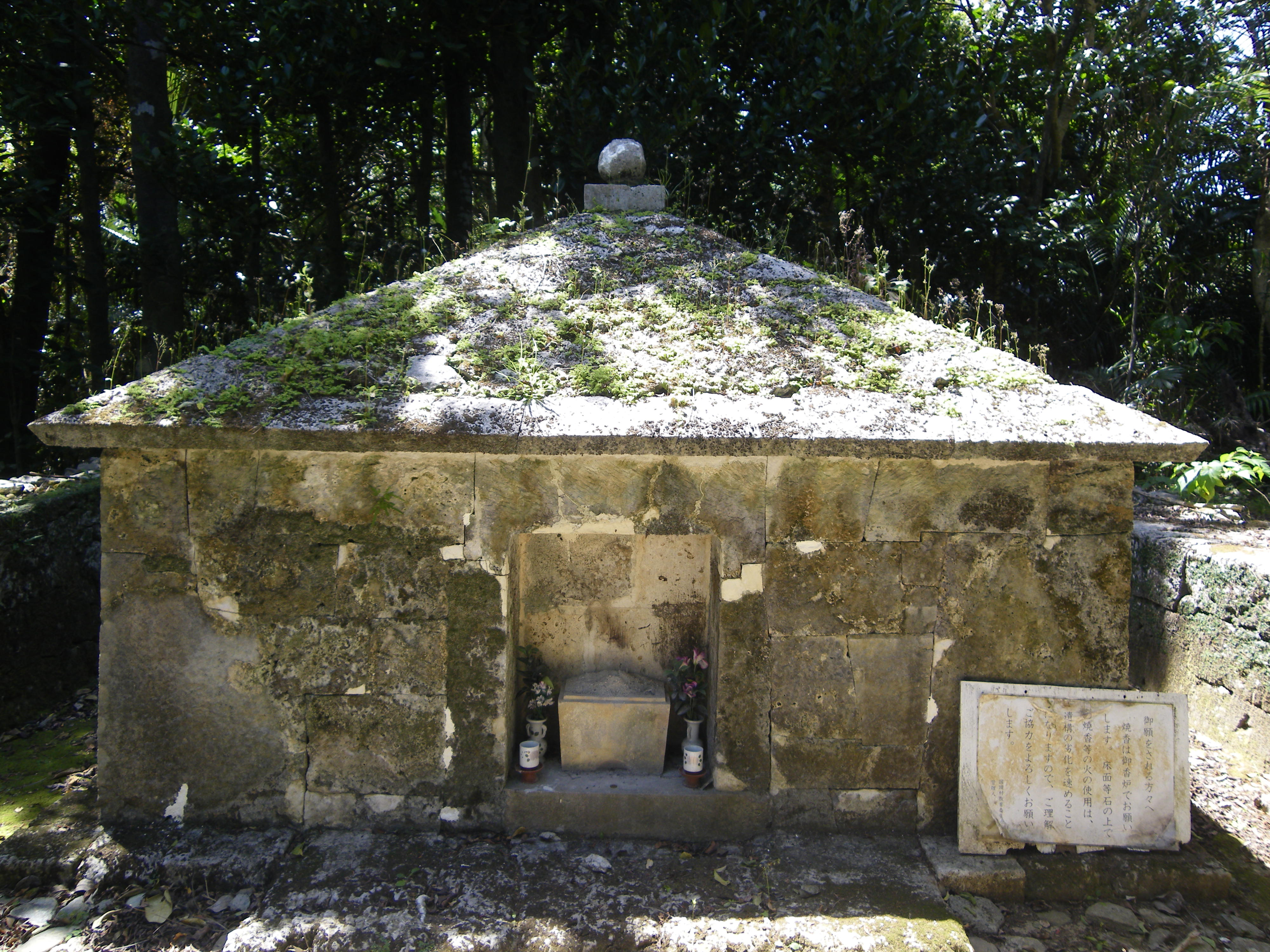
- Tomb of King Gihon

King of Ryūkyū
- Reign: 1248–1259
- Predecessor: Shunbajunki
- Successor: Eiso
- Born: 1206; Urasoe, Okinawa
- Died: after 1259; Hedo Point
- Burial: Kunigami, Okinawa
- Spouse: Unajara
- Father: Shunbajunki

Gihon (義本; 1206 – after 1259) was a legendary local ruler of Okinawa Island.

== Life, reign ==
Gihon was the third and last ruler of the Shunten dynasty. He succeeded his father Shunbajunki at the age of 44, in 1248.

Gihon's reign was marked by terrible disasters, including famine, epidemics, and devastating typhoons. Around 1254, he appointed a young lord by the name of Eiso to be Regent (Sessei), and to aid in managing these disasters. Gihon felt personally responsible for the disasters and abdicated in 1259 or 1260, and shortly thereafter "withdrew into the forest alone." Eiso succeeded him as king and established a new dynasty. The precise location, date, and circumstances of Gihon's death are unknown, though it is safe to assume he died shortly after his abdication. Local legends allege that he was last seen at the cliffs of Hedo Point, the northernmost point on Okinawa Island, and his tomb is located nearby.

== Notes ==
Preceded by Shunbajunki	King of Ryūkyū; 1248–1259	Succeeded by Eiso
