= Shunbajunki =

Shunbajunki 舜馬順熙

King of Ryūkyū
- Reign: 1237–1248
- Predecessor: Shunten
- Successor: Gihon
- Born: 1185
- Died: 1248 (aged 62–63)
- Issue: Gihon
- Divine name: Sonomasu (其益) or Sonomasumi (其益美)
- Father: Shunten

Shunbajunki (舜馬順熙, 1185 – 1248; r. 1237–1248) was a legendary local ruler of Okinawa Island. Shunbajunki was the second ruler of the Shunten dynasty. He succeeded his father Shunten in 1237.

== Life ==
Shunbajunki's reign is noted for the construction of Shuri Castle and the introduction of the Japanese kana writing system. The Chinese language and writing system was not to be introduced until roughly a century later; even after that time, government documents continued to be written in kana, as did much poetry.

Shunbajunki died in 1248, and was succeeded by his son Gihon.

== Notes ==
Preceded by Shunten	King of Ryūkyū; 1237–1248	Succeeded by Gihon
