= List of cultural properties of Japan – crafts (Okinawa) =

This list is of the cultural properties of Japan designated in the category of crafts (工芸品, kōgeihin) for the Prefecture of Okinawa.

== National Cultural Properties ==
As of 1 January 2015, two Important Cultural Properties have been designated, being of national significance.

Property	Date	Municipality	Ownership	Comments	Image	Coordinates	Ref.
Bronze Bell from the Former Shuri Castle Seiden 銅鐘（旧首里城正殿鐘） dōshō (kyū-Shuri-jō seiden shō)	1458	Naha	Okinawa Prefectural Museum and Art Museum	known as the Bridge of Nations Bell; the 333 character inscription begins "The Kingdom of the Ryūkyūs is in a splendid location in the South Seas, with close ties with Korea, intimate relations with China, and 'close as lips and teeth' with Japan; standing between the two as an Island of Utopia, with its ships it forms a bridge of nations, and the realm is filled with precious goods from foreign lands" (琉球國者南海勝地而鍾三韓之秀以大明為輔車以日域為脣歯在此ニ中間湧出之蓬莱嶋也以舟楫為万國之津梁異産至宝充満十方刹)		26°13′36″N 127°41′38″E	
Bells from Enkaku-ji 梵鐘（旧円覚寺楼鐘） 梵鐘（旧円覚寺殿前鐘） 梵鐘（旧円覚寺殿中鐘） bonshō (kyū-Engakuji rōshō) bonshō (kyū-Engakuji denzenshō) bonshō (kyū-Engakuji denchūshō)	1495/1697	Naha	Okinawa Prefectural Museum and Art Museum	three bells; two from 1495; the third, from the shōrō, was first cast in 1496 then recast in 1697; looted in the aftermath of the Battle of Okinawa, it was returned from the Philippines in 1950; with a height of 206 centimetres (6 ft 9 in) and diameter of 119 centimetres (3 ft 11 in) and weighing 1.9 tons, it is the largest in Okinawa		26°13′36″N 127°41′38″E	

== Prefectural Cultural Properties ==
As of 1 May 2014, fifty-two properties have been designated at a prefectural level.

Property	Date	Municipality	Ownership	Comments	Image	Coordinates	Ref.
Sanshin known as "Onaga Kējō" 三線翁長開鐘 sanshin Onaga Kējō		Uruma	private			26°21′48″N 127°50′52″E	for all refs see
Sanshin known as "Shitahaku Kējō" 三線志多伯開鐘 sanshin Shitahaku Kējō		Naha	private (kept at the Okinawa Prefectural Museum and Art Museum)			26°13′36″N 127°41′38″E	
Sanshin known as "Wakugawa Kējō" 三線湧川開鐘 sanshin Wakugawa Kējō		Naha	private			26°13′14″N 127°43′09″E	
Large Black Lacquer Document Box with Geese, Raden Technique 黒塗螺鈿遊雁絵大文庫 kuro nuri raden yūgan e dai bunko		Naha	Okinawa Prefectural Museum and Art Museum			26°13′36″N 127°41′38″E	
Large Black Lacquer Document Box with Landscape, Tsuikin Technique 黒塗堆錦山水絵大文庫 kuro nuri tsuikin sansui e dai bunko		Naha	Okinawa Prefectural Museum and Art Museum			26°13′36″N 127°41′38″E	
Black Lacquer Bowl and Lid with Dragon and Clouds, Raden Technique with Gold Leaf 黒塗螺鈿雲龍文内金箔蓋付椀 kuro nuri raden unryū mon nai kinpaku futa tsuki wan		Naha	Okinawa Prefectural Museum and Art Museum			26°13′36″N 127°41′38″E	
Gold Kanzashi with Dragon and Clouds from the Residence of the High Priestess 聞得大君御殿雲龍黄金簪 kikoe ōkimi udūn unryū ōgon kanzashi		Naha	Okinawa Prefectural Museum and Art Museum			26°13′36″N 127°41′38″E	
Sanshin known as "Edoyuna" 三線江戸与那 sanshin edoyuna		Naha	Okinawa Prefectural Museum and Art Museum	used on one of the Ryukyuan missions to Edo in the mid-nineteenth century, it was presented to the Shimazu clan; discovered by historian Higashionna Kanjun (東恩納寛惇) in Tokyo, it was exhibited at the Okinawa Folk Museum (沖縄郷土博物館), which opened in 1936 in the grounds of Shuri Castle; missing after the war, it was discovered by Higashionna in Hawaii in 1954 and donated to the museum		26°13′36″N 127°41′38″E	
Sanshin - Febaru Type 三線南風原型 sanshin Fēbaru gata		Chatan	private			26°19′17″N 127°46′31″E	
Sanshin - Febaru Type 三線南風原型 sanshin Fēbaru gata		Naha	private			26°12′52″N 127°41′23″E	
Sanshin - Kubanufuni Type 三線久葉の骨型 sanshin Kubo no funi gata		Naha	private			26°12′52″N 127°41′23″E	
Sanshin - Kuba Shunden Type 三線久場春殿型 sanshin Kuba shunden gata		Chatan	private			26°19′17″N 127°46′31″E	
Sanshin - Kuba Shunden Type 三線久場春殿型 sanshin Kuba shunden gata		Naha	private			26°13′10″N 127°40′47″E	
Sanshin - Chinendeku Type 三線知念大工型 sanshin Chinendeku gata		Kadena	private			26°21′52″N 127°45′17″E	
Sanshin - Yuna Type 三線与那型 sanshin Yuna gata		Kitanakagusuku	private			26°18′02″N 127°47′42″E	
Aoriyae Anji Magatama あおりやえ按司曲玉; Aoriyae anji magatama		Nakijin	private			26°41′29″N 127°55′39″E	
Round Black Lacquer Outer Box with Chrysanthemums, Flowers, Birds, and Insects, Chinkin Technique; Round Green Lacquer Inner Box with Phoenixes and Clouds, Chinkin Technique 黒塗菊花鳥虫沈金丸外櫃及ひ緑塗鳳凰雲沈金丸内櫃 kuro nuri kiku kachōchū chinkin maru soto bitsu oyobi midori nuri hōō kumo chinkin marun uchi bitsu		Kumejima	private (kept at the Kumejima Museum (久米島博物館))			26°20′30″N 126°45′50″E	
Bowl with Plum and Bamboo 枝梅竹文赤絵碗 eda ume take mon aka-e wan		Naha	Okinawa Prefectural Museum and Art Museum			26°13′36″N 127°41′38″E	
Dish with Fish 線彫染付魚文皿 senbori sometsuke gyomon sara	C18	Naha	Okinawa Prefectural Museum and Art Museum			26°13′36″N 127°41′38″E	
Chrysthemum-shaped Dish with Millet 色象嵌粟絵菊花皿 iro zōgan awa e kikka zara		Naha	Okinawa Prefectural Museum and Art Museum			26°13′36″N 127°41′38″E	
Inlaid Dachibin 象嵌色差面取抱瓶 zōgan irozashi mentori dachibin		Naha	Okinawa Prefectural Museum and Art Museum			26°13′36″N 127°41′38″E	
Bell from the Former Reinō-ji 梵鐘(旧霊応寺鐘) bonshō (kyū-Reinōji shō)		Naha	Okinawa Prefectural Museum and Art Museum			26°13′36″N 127°41′38″E	
Bell from the Former Fumonzen-ji 梵鐘(旧普門禅寺鐘) bonshō (kyū-Fumenzenji shō)		Naha	Okinawa Prefectural Museum and Art Museum			26°13′36″N 127°41′38″E	
Bell from the Former Tenryū Shōja 梵鐘(旧天竜精舎鐘) bonshō (kyū-Tenryū Shōja shō)		Naha	Okinawa Prefectural Museum and Art Museum			26°13′36″N 127°41′38″E	
Bronze Bell from the Former Tensonden 銅鐘(旧天尊殿鐘) dōshō (kyū-Tensonden shō)		Naha	Okinawa Prefectural Museum and Art Museum			26°13′36″N 127°41′38″E	
Bronze Bell from the Former Tenbi-gū 銅鐘(旧天妃宮鐘) dōshō (kyū-Tenbi-gū shō)		Naha	Okinawa Prefectural Museum and Art Museum			26°13′36″N 127°41′38″E	
Bronze Bell from the Former Ippin Gongen 銅鐘(旧一品権現鐘) dōshō (kyū-Ippin Gongen shō)		Naha	Okinawa Prefectural Museum and Art Museum			26°13′36″N 127°41′38″E	
Bell from the Former Tenkaizen-ji 梵鐘(旧天界禅寺鐘) bonshō (kyū-Tenkaizenji shō)		Kin	Kannon-ji (観音寺)			26°27′18″N 127°55′18″E	
Bell from the Former Ryūshō-ji 梵鐘(旧竜翔寺鐘) bonshō (kyū-Ryūshōji shō)		Itoman	Itoman City (kept at Itoman Municipal Chūō Public Hall (糸満市立中央公民館)			26°07′38″N 127°40′44″E	
Bell from the Former Daianzen-ji (Gokoku-ji) 梵鐘 旧大安禅寺鐘 (一名 護国寺の鐘) bonshō kyū-Daianzenji shō (ichi-mei Gokokuji no kane)	1456	Naha	Okinawa Prefectural Museum and Art Museum	the bell's inscription includes, as translated by George Kerr: "May the sound of this bell shatter illusory dreams, perfect the souls of mankind, and enable the King and his subjects to live so virtuously that barbarians will find no occasion to invade the Kingdom"; removed in 1854 by Perry, the bell hung for many years at the United States Naval Academy in Annapolis (where there is now a replica (pictured)), before being returned in 1987		26°13′36″N 127°41′38″E	
Bell from the Former Eifuku-ji 梵鐘(旧永福寺鐘) bonshō (kyū-Eifukuji shō)		Naha	Okinawa Prefectural Museum and Art Museum			26°13′36″N 127°41′38″E	
Black Lacquer Desk with Landscape with Pavilions and Figures, Raden Technique 黒漆山水楼閣人物螺鈿机 kuro urushi sansui rōkaku jinbutsu raden tsukue		Naha	Okinawa Prefectural Museum and Art Museum			26°13′36″N 127°41′38″E	
White Square Tray with Landscape with Pavilions and Figures, Gold Leaf and Litharge Painting 白密陀山水楼閣人物漆絵箔絵角盆 shiro mitsuda sansui rōkaku jinbutsu urushi-e haku-e kakubon	C17/18	Naha	Okinawa Prefectural Museum and Art Museum	height of 4.8 centimetres (1.9 in), length of 34.0 centimetres (13.4 in), and width of 34.0 centimetres (13.4 in)		26°13′36″N 127°41′38″E	
Red Lacquer Round Serving Tray with Landscape with Pavilions and Figures, Gold Leaf 朱漆山水楼閣人物箔絵丸型東道盆 shu urushi sansui rōkaku jinbutsu haku-e marugata tundābun		Naha	Okinawa Prefectural Museum and Art Museum			26°13′36″N 127°41′38″E	
Black Lacquer Tray with Roses, Tsuikin Technique 黒漆薔薇堆錦軸盆 kuro urushi bara tsuikin jikubon		Naha	Okinawa Prefectural Museum and Art Museum			26°13′36″N 127°41′38″E	
Large Red Lacquer Tray with Tomoe and Peonies, Chinkin Technique 朱漆巴紋牡丹沈金大御供飯 shu urushi tomoe mon botan chinkin ō-ukufan		Naha	Okinawa Prefectural Museum and Art Museum			26°13′36″N 127°41′38″E	
Red Lacquer Table with Peonies and a Long-tailed Bird, Raden Technique 朱漆牡丹尾長鳥螺鈿卓 shu-urushi botan onaga-dori raden taku	C16/17	Urasoe	Urasoe City (kept at Urasoe Art Museum)	height of 31.0 centimetres (12.2 in), length of 47.3 centimetres (18.6 in), and width of 31.8 centimetres (12.5 in); black lacquer underneath		26°15′00″N 127°43′10″E	
Red Lacquer Desk with Birds and Flowers, Raden Technique with Gold Leaf and Litharge Painting 朱漆花鳥螺鈿箔絵密陀絵机 shu urushi kachō raden haku-e mitsuda-e tsukue	C16/17	Urasoe	Urasoe City (kept at Urasoe Art Museum)	height of 25.7 centimetres (10.1 in), length of 111.6 centimetres (43.9 in), and width of 48.0 centimetres (18.9 in); black lacquer underneath; the flowers include peonies and chrysanthemums		26°15′00″N 127°43′10″E	
Black Lacquer Box with Chrysanthemums, Raden Technique 黒漆葵紋菊螺鈿箱 kuro urushi aoi mon kiku raden bako	C17/18	Urasoe	Urasoe City (kept at Urasoe Art Museum)	height of 11.3 centimetres (4.4 in), length of 12.6 centimetres (5.0 in), width of 10.3 centimetres (4.1 in)		26°15′00″N 127°43′10″E	
Large Black Lacquer Tray with Dragons and Clouds, Raden Technique 黒漆雲龍螺鈿大盆 kuro urushi unryū raden ō-bon	C17/18	Urasoe	Urasoe City (kept at Urasoe Art Museum)	height of 9.3 centimetres (3.7 in), diameter of 85.3 centimetres (33.6 in)		26°15′00″N 127°43′10″E	
Black Lacquer Table with Peony Scrolls, Raden Technique 黒漆牡丹唐草螺鈿卓 kuro urushi botan karakusa raden taku	C18/19	Urasoe	Urasoe City (kept at Urasoe Art Museum)	height of 10.3 centimetres (4.1 in), length of 35.5 centimetres (14.0 in), width of 23.7 centimetres (9.3 in); a rare signed piece, inscribed underneath in gold on black lacquer "Made by Une Ryōhō of Chūzan" (中山宇根良方製之)		26°15′00″N 127°43′10″E	
Sanshin known as "Morishima Kējō" 三線盛嶋開鐘附胴 sanshin Morishima Kējō tsuketari dō		Naha	Okinawa Prefectural Museum and Art Museum			26°13′36″N 127°41′38″E	
Sanshin known as "Tomori Kējō" 三線富盛開鐘附胴 sanshin Tumui Kējō tsuketari dō		Naha	Okinawa Prefecture (kept at the Okinawa Prefectural University of Arts)			26°12′55″N 127°43′03″E	
Sanshin - Makabi Type, inscribed "Nishihira" 三線真壁型銘西平 sanshin makabi gata mei Nishihira		Yonabaru	private			26°12′02″N 127°45′24″E	
Sanshin - Makabi Type, inscribed "Amuro" 三線真壁型銘安室 sanshin makabi gata mei Amuro		Onna	private			26°29′53″N 127°51′07″E	
Sanshin - Makabi Type 三線真壁型 sanshin makabi gata		Onna	private			26°24′28″N 127°49′45″E	
Sanshin - Ufu-makabi Type 三線大真壁型附胴 sanshin ufumakabi gata tsuketari dō		Naha	private			26°12′23″N 127°42′10″E	
Sanshin - Hiranaka Chinen Type, inscribed Tokuke 三線平仲知念型銘時受 sanshin hiranaka chinen gata mei Tokuke		Okinawa	private			26°19′41″N 127°47′20″E	
Sanshin - Yonagusuku Type, inscribed Tamagusuku Yona 三線与那城型銘玉城與那 sanshin Yonagushiku gata mei Tamagushiku Yuna		Okinawa	private			26°21′04″N 127°48′41″E	
Sanshin - Itogura Nagayonagusuku Type 三線糸蔵長与那城型 sanshin itogura nagayonagushiku gata		Okinawa	private			26°21′45″N 127°48′42″E	
Black Lacquer Bowl with Chrysanthemums, Flowers, Birds, and Insects, Chinkin Technique 黒漆菊花鳥虫七宝繋沈金食籠 kuro urushi kiku kachō mushi shippō tsunagi chinkin jikirō		Naha	Okinawa Churashima Foundation (沖縄美ら島財団) (kept at the Shuri Castle Park Management Centre (首里城公園管理センター))			26°13′01″N 127°43′10″E	
Black Lacquer Bowl with Peonies, Chinkin Technique 黒漆牡丹七宝繋沈金食籠 kuro urushi botan shippō tsunagi chinkin jikirō		Naha	Okinawa Churashima Foundation (沖縄美ら島財団) (kept at the Shuri Castle Park Management Centre (首里城公園管理センター))			26°13′01″N 127°43′10″E	

== Municipal Cultural Properties ==
As of 1 May 2014, sixty-five properties have been designated at a municipal level.

Property	Date	Municipality	Ownership	Comments	Image	Coordinates	Ref.
Nakijin Noro Ritual Implements 今帰仁ノロの祭祀道具一式; Nakijin noro no saishi dōgu isshiki		Nakijin	private			26°41′59″N 127°55′50″E	for all refs see
Nakagusuku Noro Ritual Implements 中城ノロの祭祀道具一式; Nakagusuku noro no saishi dōgu isshiki		Nakijin	private			26°41′51″N 127°56′39″E	
Serikyaku Noro Ritual Implements 勢理客ノロの祭祀道具一式; Serikyaku noro no saishi dōgu isshiki		Nakijin	private			26°40′35″N 127°59′08″E	
Kogachi Ware Black Glazed Jar with Handles 古我知焼黒釉耳付壷; Kogachi-yaki kokuyū mimi-tsuki tsubo		Nago	Nago Museum			26°35′10″N 127°59′13″E	
Kogachi Ware Small Unglazed Water Jar 古我知焼焼締小型水甕; Kogachi-yaki yakiji kogata mizugame		Nago	Nago Museum			26°35′10″N 127°59′13″E	
Kogachi Ware Glazed Vase-shaped Sarchophagus 古我知焼壷型クヮディーサー釉厨子甕; Kogachi-yaki tsubo-gata kuwadisa yū zushigame		Nago	Nago Museum			26°35′10″N 127°59′13″E	
Kogachi Ware Ameyu Glazed Vase-shaped Sarchophagus 古我知焼壷型飴釉厨子甕; Kogachiyaki tsubo-gata ameyū zushikame		Nago	Nago Museum			26°35′10″N 127°59′13″E	
Kogachi Ware Black Glazed Vase-shaped Sarchophagus 古我知焼壷型黒釉厨子甕; Kogachiyaki tsubo-gata ameyū zushikame		Nago	Nago Museum			26°35′10″N 127°59′13″E	
Kogachi Ware Black Glazed Vase-shaped Sarchophagus 古我知焼壷型黒釉厨子甕; Kogachiyaki tsubo-gata ameyū zushikame		Nago	Nago Museum			26°35′10″N 127°59′13″E	
Kogachi Ware Black Glazed Vase-shaped Sarchophagus 古我知焼壷型黒釉厨子甕; Kogachiyaki tsubo-gata ameyū zushikame		Nago	Nago Museum			26°35′10″N 127°59′13″E	
Kogachi Ware Unglazed Jar and Lid with Four Handles 壷屋焼焼締四耳蓋付壷; Kogachiyaki yakiji shi mimi futa-tsuki tsubo		Nago	Nago Museum			26°35′10″N 127°59′13″E	
Kogachi Ware Water Bowl 古我知焼水盤; Kogachiyaki suiban		Nago	Nago Museum			26°35′10″N 127°59′13″E	
Sanshin - Makabi Type, Large 三線真壁型(大型) sanshin makabi gata (ōgata)		Uruma	private			26°25′06″N 127°49′08″E	
Sanshin - Hiranaka Chinen Type, Large 三線平仲知念型(大型) sanshin hiranaka chinen gata (ōgata)		Uruma	private			26°24′28″N 127°49′45″E	
Sanshin - Kamoguchi Yuna Type, Medium 三線鴨口与那型(中型) sanshin kamoguchi yuna gata (chūgata)		Uruma	private			26°25′51″N 127°49′43″E	
Kamiji Bamboo Basket 上地のバーキ(與志平朝蒲制作竹細工); Kamiji no bāki (Atae Shihei asachō seisaku take zaiku)		Okinawa	Okinawa City Municipal Museum (沖縄市立郷土博物館)			26°19′54″N 127°47′43″E	
Sanshin - Makabi Type 三線真壁型 sanshin makabi gata		Kadena	private			26°21′41″N 127°45′09″E	
Green Lacquer Round Chest with Phoenixes and Clouds, Chinking Technique 緑漆鳳凰雲点斜格子沈金丸櫃 midori urushi hōō un tensha kōshi chinkin maru hitsu	C16/17	Urasoe	Urasoe City (kept at Urasoe Art Museum)	height of 17.1 centimetres (6.7 in), diameter of 19.1 centimetres (7.5 in)		26°15′00″N 127°43′10″E	
Red Lacquer Tray with Birds and Flowers, Chinkin Technique 朱漆花鳥沈金膳 shu urushi kachō chinkin zen	C16/17	Urasoe	Urasoe City (kept at Urasoe Art Museum)	height of 2.5 centimetres (0.98 in), length of 36.9 centimetres (14.5 in), and width of 36.8 centimetres (14.5 in); gilt line engraved		26°15′00″N 127°43′10″E	
Red Lacquer Footed Tray with Landscape with Figures, Chinkin Technique 朱漆山水人物沈金足付盆 shu urushi sansui jinbutsu chinkin ashi-tsuke bon	C16/17	Urasoe	Urasoe City (kept at Urasoe Art Museum)	height of 20.2 centimetres (8.0 in), diameter of 44.0 centimetres (17.3 in)		26°15′00″N 127°43′10″E	
Green Lacquer Tray with Peony Scrolls, Chinkin Technique 緑漆牡丹唐草石畳沈金膳 midori urushi botan karakusa ishidatami chinkin zen	C16/17	Urasoe	Urasoe City (kept at Urasoe Art Museum)	height of 4.1 centimetres (1.6 in), length of 36.4 centimetres (14.3 in), and width of 36.0 centimetres (14.2 in)		26°15′00″N 127°43′10″E	
Round Red Lacquer Footed Tray with Tomoe and Peonies, Chinkin Technique 朱漆牡丹巴紋七宝繋沈金足付盆 shu urushi botan tomoe mon shippō tsunagi chinkin ashi tsuki bon	C18/19	Urasoe	Urasoe City (kept at Urasoe Art Museum)	height of 16.3 centimetres (6.4 in), diameter of 40.5 centimetres (15.9 in)		26°15′00″N 127°43′10″E	
Red Lacquer Square Tray with Kanzan Jittoku, Raden Technique 朱漆寒山拾得螺鈿四方盆 shu urushi kanzan jittoku raden yohōbon	C16/17	Urasoe	Urasoe City (kept at Urasoe Art Museum)	height of 2.3 centimetres (0.91 in), sides of 19.5 centimetres (7.7 in)		26°15′00″N 127°43′10″E	
Red Lacquer Hexagonal Tray with Moon and Plum, Raden Technique 朱漆梅月螺鈿六角盆 shu urushi ume tsuki raden rokkaku bon	C16/17	Urasoe	Urasoe City (kept at Urasoe Art Museum)	height of 6.1 centimetres (2.4 in), diameter of 41.7 centimetres (16.4 in)		26°15′00″N 127°43′10″E	
Long Black Lacquer Writing Box with Dragons, Clouds, and Phoenixes, Raden Technique 黒漆雲龍鳳凰螺鈿長文箱 kuro urushi unryū hōō raden chōbun-bako	C16/17	Urasoe	Urasoe City (kept at Urasoe Art Museum)	height of 6.8 centimetres (2.7 in), length of 37.5 centimetres (14.8 in), and width of 8.8 centimetres (3.5 in)		26°15′00″N 127°43′10″E	
Black Lacquer Box with Caltrops, Raden Technique 黒漆菱七宝繋螺鈿伽羅箱 kuro urushi hishi shippō tsunagi raden kyara bako	C17/18	Urasoe	Urasoe City (kept at Urasoe Art Museum)	height of 10.0 centimetres (3.9 in), length of 10.6 centimetres (4.2 in), and width of 15.2 centimetres (6.0 in)		26°15′00″N 127°43′10″E	
Black Lacquer Incense Container with Kirin, Grapes, and Squirrels, Raden Technique 黒漆麒麟葡萄栗鼠螺鈿重香合 kuro urushi kirin budō risu raden jūkōgō	C17/18	Urasoe	Urasoe City (kept at Urasoe Art Museum)	height of 11.3 centimetres (4.4 in), sides of 10.3 centimetres (4.1 in)		26°15′00″N 127°43′10″E	
Black Lacquer Flower-Shaped Tray with Landscape with Figures, Raden Technique 黒漆山水人物螺鈿輪花盆 kuro urushi sansui jinbutsu raden ringa bon	C17/18	Urasoe	Urasoe City (kept at Urasoe Art Museum)	height of 5.0 centimetres (2.0 in), length of 57.7 centimetres (22.7 in), width of 37.2 centimetres (14.6 in)		26°15′00″N 127°43′10″E	
Black Lacquer Tray with Dragon and Clouds, Raden Technique 黒漆雲龍螺鈿盆 kuro urushi unryū raden bon	C17/18	Urasoe	Urasoe City (kept at Urasoe Art Museum)	height of 9.3 centimetres (3.7 in), diameter of 85.3 centimetres (33.6 in)		26°15′00″N 127°43′10″E	
Black Lacquer Hexagonal Food Container with Pavilions and Figures, Raden Technique 黒漆楼閣人物螺鈿八角食籠 kuro urushi rōkaku jinbutsu raden hakkaku jikirō	C18/19	Urasoe	Urasoe City (kept at Urasoe Art Museum)	height of 20.6 centimetres (8.1 in), diameter of 27.0 centimetres (10.6 in)		26°15′00″N 127°43′10″E	
Black Lacquer Hexagonal Tray with Vegetation, Fish, and Plovers, Raden Technique 黒漆藻魚千鳥螺鈿八角食籠 kuro urushi rōkaku jinbutsu raden hakkaku jikirō	C18/19	Urasoe	Urasoe City (kept at Urasoe Art Museum)	height of 30.7 centimetres (12.1 in), diameter of 29.4 centimetres (11.6 in)		26°15′00″N 127°43′10″E	
Black Lacquer Box with Figures on Horseback, Raden Technique 黒漆騎馬人物螺鈿箱 kuro urushi kiba jinbutsu raden bako	C17/18	Urasoe	Urasoe City (kept at Urasoe Art Museum)	height of 15.2 centimetres (6.0 in), length of 40.5 centimetres (15.9 in), width of 28.6 centimetres (11.3 in)		26°15′00″N 127°43′10″E	
Black Lacquer Serving Tray with Paulownias and Phoenixes, Raden Technique 黒漆桐鳳凰螺鈿東道盆 kuro urushi kiri hōō raden tundābun	C18/19	Urasoe	Urasoe City (kept at Urasoe Art Museum)	height of 26.2 centimetres (10.3 in), sides of 34.5 centimetres (13.6 in)		26°15′00″N 127°43′10″E	
Black Lacquer Screen with Landscape with Figures, Raden Technique 黒漆山水人物螺鈿衝立 kuro urushi sansui jinbutsu raden tsuitate		Urasoe	Urasoe City (kept at Urasoe Art Museum)			26°15′00″N 127°43′10″E	
Black Lacquer Cupboard with Shelves with Pavilions and Figures, Raden Technique 黒漆楼閣人物螺鈿飾棚 kuro urushi rōkaku jinbutsu raden kazari tana		Urasoe	Urasoe City (kept at Urasoe Art Museum)			26°15′00″N 127°43′10″E	
Black Lacquer Helmet-Shaped Tobacco Container with Landscape with Figures, Raden Technique 黒漆山水人物螺鈿阿古陀形煙草入 kuro urushi sansui jinbutsu raden akodanari tabakoire		Urasoe	Urasoe City (kept at Urasoe Art Museum)			26°15′00″N 127°43′10″E	
Black Lacquer Writing Paper Box with Grapes and Squirrels, Raden Technique with Gold Leaf 黒漆葡萄栗鼠螺鈿箔絵料紙箱 kuro urushi budō risu raden haku-e ryōshi bako	C16/17	Urasoe	Urasoe City (kept at Urasoe Art Museum)	height of 15.0 centimetres (5.9 in), length of 41.5 centimetres (16.3 in), and width of 31.2 centimetres (12.3 in)		26°15′00″N 127°43′10″E	
Lacquered Inkstone Box with Grapes and Squirrels, Raden Technique with Gold Leaf 潤塗葡萄栗鼠螺鈿箔絵硯箱 jun nuri budō risu raden haku-e suzuri bako		Urasoe	Urasoe City (kept at Urasoe Art Museum)			26°15′00″N 127°43′10″E	
Black Lacquer Box, Raden Technique with Gold Leaf 黒漆吉祥文螺鈿箔絵箱 kuro urushi kisshō bun raden haku-e bako		Urasoe	Urasoe City (kept at Urasoe Art Museum)			26°15′00″N 127°43′10″E	
Black Lacquer Hexagonal Food Container with Twenty-Four Panels, Raden and Chinkin Technique 黒漆二十四孝唐草螺鈿沈金八角食籠 kuro urushi nijūyon kō karakusa raden chinkin hakkaku jikirō	C17/18	Urasoe	Urasoe City (kept at Urasoe Art Museum)	height of 28.7 centimetres (11.3 in), diameter of 29.0 centimetres (11.4 in)		26°15′00″N 127°43′10″E	
Black Lacquer Hexagonal Food Container with Grapes and Squirrels, Gold Leaf 黒漆葡萄栗鼠箔絵八角食籠 kuro urushi budō risu haku-e hakkaku jikirō	C17/18	Urasoe	Urasoe City (kept at Urasoe Art Museum)	height of 27.0 centimetres (10.6 in), diameter of 28.0 centimetres (11.0 in)		26°15′00″N 127°43′10″E	
Lacquered Flower-Shaped Food Container with Boats and Vegetation, Gold Leaf 潤塗舟遊草花箔絵稜花形食籠 jun nuri funa asobi kusabana haku-e ryō hanagata jikirō	C17/18	Urasoe	Urasoe City (kept at Urasoe Art Museum)	height of 30.0 centimetres (11.8 in), diameter of 24.7 centimetres (9.7 in)		26°15′00″N 127°43′10″E	
Red Lacquer Flower-Shaped Food Container with Pavilions and Figures, Gold Leaf 朱漆楼閣人物箔絵稜花形食籠 shu urushi rōkaku jinbutsu haku-e ryō hanagata jikirō		Urasoe	Urasoe City (kept at Urasoe Art Museum)			26°15′00″N 127°43′10″E	
Lacquered Covered Pail with Landscape with Pavilions, Gold Leaf 白檀塗楼閣山水箔絵湯庫 byakudan nuri rōkaku sansui haku-e tākū	C18/19	Urasoe	Urasoe City (kept at Urasoe Art Museum)	height of 25.3 centimetres (10.0 in), diameter of 24.2 centimetres (9.5 in); octagonal		26°15′00″N 127°43′10″E	
Red Lacquer Serving Tray with Figures, Gold Leaf 朱漆山水人物箔絵東道盆 shu urushi sansui jinbutsu haku-e tundābun	C18/19	Urasoe	Urasoe City (kept at Urasoe Art Museum)	height of 30.0 centimetres (11.8 in), diameter of 49.5 centimetres (19.5 in); black lacquer interior with nine small jade dishes		26°15′00″N 127°43′10″E	
Lacquered Round Food Container with Flowers and Birds, Gold Leaf and Litharge Painting 潤塗花鳥箔絵密陀絵丸形食籠 jun nuri kachō haku-e mitsuda-e marugata jikirō	C16/17	Urasoe	Urasoe City (kept at Urasoe Art Museum)	height of 28.7 centimetres (11.3 in), diameter of 27.9 centimetres (11.0 in)		26°15′00″N 127°43′10″E	
Black Lacquer Tray with Flowers and Birds, Raden Technique with Gold Leaf and Litharge Painting 黒漆花鳥螺鈿箔絵密陀絵盆 kuro urushi kachō raden haku-e mitsuda-e bon		Urasoe	Urasoe City (kept at Urasoe Art Museum)			26°15′00″N 127°43′10″E	
Black Lacquer Octagonal Food Container with Landscape with Figures, Raden Technique 黒漆山水人物螺鈿八角食籠 kuro urushi sansui jinbutsu raden hakkaku jikirō		Urasoe	Urasoe City (kept at Urasoe Art Museum)			26°15′00″N 127°43′10″E	
Red Lacquer Screen with Tiger and Bamboo, Raden and Chinkin Technique 朱漆竹虎連珠沈金螺鈿座屏 shu urushi take tora renju chinkin raden zahei	C17/18	Urasoe	Urasoe City (kept at Urasoe Art Museum)	height of 76.0 centimetres (29.9 in), length of 92.2 centimetres (36.3 in), width of 38.8 centimetres (15.3 in)		26°15′00″N 127°43′10″E	
Black Lacquer Box with Grapes and Squirrels, Raden Technique with Gold Leaf 黒漆葡萄栗鼠螺鈿箔絵箱 kuro urushi budō risu raden haku-e bako	C16/17	Urasoe	Urasoe City (kept at Urasoe Art Museum)	height of 11.3 centimetres (4.4 in), diameter of 12.5 centimetres (4.9 in)		26°15′00″N 127°43′10″E	
Black Lacquer Food Container with Peacocks and Peony Scrolls, Chinkin Technique 黒漆孔雀牡丹唐草沈金食籠 kuro urushi kujaku botan karakusa chinkin jikirō	C16/17	Urasoe	Urasoe City (kept at Urasoe Art Museum)	height of 36.7 centimetres (14.4 in), diameter of 33.6 centimetres (13.2 in)		26°15′00″N 127°43′10″E	
Red and Black Lacquer Table with Dragon and Clouds, Raden and Chinkin Technique 朱黒漆雲龍沈金螺鈿卓 shu kuro urushi unryū chinkin raden taku	C17/18	Urasoe	Urasoe City (kept at Urasoe Art Museum)	height of 43.0 centimetres (16.9 in), length of 182.0 centimetres (71.7 in), width of 86.5 centimetres (34.1 in)		26°15′00″N 127°43′10″E	
Black Lacquer Plaque with Shiba Onkō Family Precepts, Raden Technique 黒漆司馬温公家訓螺鈿掛板 kuro urushi Shiba Onkō kakun raden kakeita		Urasoe	Urasoe City (kept at Urasoe Art Museum)			26°15′00″N 127°43′10″E	
White Square Tray with Landscape with Pavilions and Figures, Gold Leaf and Litharge Painting 白密陀山水楼閣人物密陀絵箔絵四方盆 shiro mitsuda sansui rōkaku jinbutsu mitsuda-e haku-e yohō bon	C17/18	Urasoe	Urasoe City (kept at Urasoe Art Museum)	height of 2.9 centimetres (1.1 in), length of 29.0 centimetres (11.4 in), and width of 29.0 centimetres (11.4 in)		26°15′00″N 127°43′10″E	
Black Lacquer Table with Landscape with Pavilions, Raden Technique 黒漆山水楼閣螺鈿中央卓 kuro urushi sansui rōkaku raden chūōjoku		Urasoe	Urasoe City (kept at Urasoe Art Museum)			26°15′00″N 127°43′10″E	
Red Lacquer Tray with Flowers and Birds, Litharge Painting 朱漆花鳥密陀絵盆 shu urushi kachō mitsuda-e bon		Urasoe	Urasoe City (kept at Urasoe Art Museum)			26°15′00″N 127°43′10″E	
Funerary Urn 蔵骨器1727年製「壜」 zōkotsuki 1727 nensei "bin"	1727	Naha	private			26°12′50″N 127°41′27″E	
Ritual Goods of Iheya no Amoganashi 伊平屋の阿母加那志拝領品; Iheya no Amoganashi hairyō-hin		Izena	private			26°55′04″N 127°56′02″E	
Ritual Goods of the Irei Family 北の二かや田(伊禮家)の拝領品; Kita no Nikayata (Irei-ke) no hairyō-hin		Izena	private			26°55′34″N 127°56′56″E	
Ritual Goods of the Tamaki Family 南の二かや田(玉城家)の拝領品; Minami no Nikayata (Tamaki-ke) no hairyō-hin		Izena	private			26°55′33″N 127°56′56″E	
Mekaru Family Heirlooms 銘苅家所蔵品; Mekaru-ke shozō-hin		Izena	Izena Village (kept at the Izena Fureai Folk Museum (伊是名村ふれあい民俗館))			26°55′21″N 127°56′28″E	
Sample Patterns 御絵図 miezu	early C18	Ishigaki	Ishigaki City (kept at the Ishigaki City Yaeyama Museum)	46 items; designs for tribute cloth for the Ryūkyū court; also a Municipal Cultural Property - Historical Materials		24°20′17″N 124°09′34″E	
Clothing of Inafuku Chikudun 稲福筑登之正装; Inafuku Chikudun no seisō		Taketomi	private	on Kohama Island		24°20′26″N 123°58′43″E	
Minamikawada Yonatoshi Clothing and Tea Utensils 南川田於那利の衣装及び茶器; Minamikawada Yonatoshi no ishō oyobi chaki		Taketomi	private	on Kohama Island		24°20′26″N 123°58′43″E	
Nakasujinu Nubema Water Jar 仲筋ぬヌベマの水がめ; Nakasujinu nubema no mizugame		Taketomi	private	on Kohama Island		24°19′32″N 124°05′09″E	

== See also ==
- Cultural Properties of Japan
- List of National Treasures of Japan (crafts: swords)
- List of National Treasures of Japan (crafts: others)
- List of Intangible Cultural Properties of Japan (Okinawa)
- Ryukyuan lacquerware
- Museums in Okinawa Prefecture
