= List of cultural properties of Japan – paintings (Okinawa) =

This list is of the cultural properties of Japan designated in the category of paintings (絵画, kaiga) for the Prefecture of Okinawa.

== National Cultural Properties ==
As of 1 June 2019, zero properties have been designated as being of national significance.

== Prefectural Cultural Properties ==
As of 1 May 2018, eleven properties have been designated at a prefectural level.

| Property | Date | Municipality | Ownership | Comments | Image | Dimensions | Coordinates | Ref. |
|---|---|---|---|---|---|---|---|---|
| Hakutaku, by Ji Ryō 自了筆白沢之図; Ji Ryō hitsu Hakutaku-no-zu | 1630s/40s | Naha | institutional (kept at the Shuri Castle Park Management Centre (首里城公園管理センター)) | Ji Ryō is the art name of Gusukuma Seihō (1614–1644), son of a Shuri pechin | | | 26°13′06″N 127°42′55″E | for all refs see |
| Flowers and birds, colour on silk, by Sonoku 絹本着色花鳥図孫億筆 kinuhon chakushoku kachō zu Sonoku hitsu | early Qing dynasty | Kumejima | private (kept at the Kumejima Museum) | Chinese painter Sonoku, active in Fuzhou in the second half of the seventeenth century, exerted considerable influence on Ryūkyūan painting after local painters Ishimine Denbaku (石嶺伝莫) and Uehara Shinshira (上原真知ら) crossed to China and received instruction from him in 1683; Sonoku's painting of flowers and birds was presented in thanks to the Kikumura family after the shipwreck of the Imperial Chinese mission off Kumejima in 1756 | | | 26°20′30″N 126°45′49″E | |
| Flowers and birds, colour on silk, by In Genryō 絹本着色花鳥図殷元良筆 kinuhon chakushoku kachō-zu In Genryō hitsu | C18 | Naha | Okinawa Prefecture (kept at the Okinawa Prefectural Museum & Art Museum) | In Genryō (1718–1767) was born in Shuri and summoned to the Ryūkyū court on account of his talent in painting aged 12; from 1752 he spent two years in China; after the death of Yamaguchi Sōki (山口宗季), In Genryō was the leading court painter; most of his works are now lost; the shape of the branches of the plum and the distribution of its flowers, combining vigour with delicacy, are characteristic of the Southern School and thence of Nanga | | 98.7 centimetres (38.9 in) by 43.7 centimetres (17.2 in) | 26°13′38″N 127°41′38″E | |
| Pheasant in the snow, colour on paper, by In Genryō 紙本着色雪中雉子の図殷元良筆 shihon chakushoku setchū kiji no zu In Genryō hitsu | C18 | Naha | Okinawa Prefecture (kept at the Okinawa Prefectural Museum & Art Museum) | there is no snowfall in Okinawa, but in the shoin of Shuri Castle In Genryō studied Chinese exemplars of the subject of flowers and birds in the snow | | 143.7 centimetres (56.6 in) by 67.2 centimetres (26.5 in) | 26°13′38″N 127°41′38″E | |
| Bamboo, ink on paper, by In Genryō 紙本墨画竹の図殷元良筆 shihon bokuga take no zu In Genryō hitsu | 1763 | Naha | Okinawa Prefecture (kept at the Okinawa Prefectural Museum & Art Museum) | ink wash paintings on the subject of bamboo provided suitable decoration for the tokonoma of the warrior family residences of Shuri | | 101.7 centimetres (40.0 in) by 45.5 centimetres (17.9 in) | 26°13′38″N 127°41′38″E | |
| Mission to the Ryūkyūs, colour on paper 紙本着色奉使琉球図 shihon chakushoku hōshi Ryūkyū zu | Edo period | Naha | Okinawa Prefecture (kept at the Okinawa Prefectural Museum & Art Museum) | emakimono with twenty views of one of the Imperial Chinese missions on its journey from the port of Fuzhou to that of Naha and back again | | | 26°13′38″N 127°41′38″E | |
| Procession on a Mission to the Ryūkyūs, colour on paper 紙本着色冊封使行列図 shihon chakushoku sakuhōshi gyōretsu zu | Edo period | Naha | Okinawa Prefecture (kept at the Okinawa Prefectural Museum & Art Museum) | emakimono depicting some 600 figures, 380 Ryukyuans and 220 envoys | | 22.5 metres (73 ft 10 in) | 26°13′38″N 127°41′38″E | |
| Divine cat, by Yamaguchi Sōki 神猫図山口宗季筆 shinbyō zu Yamaguchi Sōki hitsu | c. 1725 | Naha | Naha City (kept at the Naha City Museum of History) | the reputation of Yamaguchi Sōki (1672-1743) was such that he received commissions for paintings of flowers and birds from the Shimazu clan in Satsuma and Konoe family in Kyoto | | | 26°12′49″N 127°40′45″E | |
| Portrait of Tōnin Taku, colour on paper 紙本着色東任鐸 (知念里之子親雲上政行) 画像附一、教訓十箇条ー、掛物入箱 shihon chakushoku Tōnin Taku (Chinen sato-nushi-peeichin Seigyō) gazō tsuketari ichi, kyōkun jūkajō ichi, kakemono iribako | c. 1839 | Ishigaki | private (kept at the Ishigaki City Yaeyama Museum) | accompanied by a scroll with ten precepts and a storage case; portrait of Tōnin Taku (1778-1861), village pechin, aged 61 | | | 24°20′17″N 124°09′34″E | |
| Portrait of Miyahira Chōen, colour on paper 紙本着色宮平長延画像 shihon chakushoku Miyahira Chōen gazō | c. 1845 | Ishigaki | private (kept at the Ishigaki City Yaeyama Museum) | portrait of Miyahira Chōen (1674-1749) aged 71 | | | 24°20′17″N 124°09′34″E | |
| Portrait of Kikumura Kiyoshi Satoshi, colour on paper 紙本着色喜久村絜聡(片目地頭代)像 shihon chakushoku Kikumura Kiyoshi Satoshi (Katami Jitōde) zō | c. 1759 | Kumejima | private (kept at the Kumejima Museum) | thought to have been painted when the sitter was 47; the Kikumura family served as local officials on Kumejima | | 130.2 centimetres (51.3 in) by 72.6 centimetres (28.6 in) | 26°20′30″N 126°45′49″E | |

== Municipal Cultural Properties ==
As of 1 May 2018, six properties have been designated at a municipal level.

| Property | Date | Municipality | Ownership | Comments | Image | Dimensions | Coordinates | Ref. |
|---|---|---|---|---|---|---|---|---|
| Genuine Views of the Ryūkyū Islands, emaki 「琉球嶌真景」絵巻; Ryūkyū-tō shinkei emaki | late C18/early C19 | Nago | Nago Museum | by Okamoto Toyohiko (岡本豊彦) of the Shijō School (四条派) | | 14 metres (45 ft 11 in) by 42 centimetres (17 in) | 26°35′10″N 127°59′13″E | for all refs see |
| Ryūkyū Trading Port, byōbu 琉球交易港図屏風; Ryūkyū kōekikō zu byōbu | C19 | Urasoe | Urasoe City (kept at Urasoe Art Museum) | includes depictions of tribute ships returning from China, dragon boats, Omono gusuku (御物城), Yarazamori gusuku, Mie gusuku, Naminoue Shrine, Sōgen-ji, Enkaku-ji, and Shuri Castle | | 120.0 centimetres (47.2 in) by 290.0 centimetres (114.2 in) | 26°15′00″N 127°43′10″E | |
| Eight Views of Ryūkyū 琉球八景; Ryūkyū hakkei | c. 1832 | Urasoe | Urasoe City (kept at Urasoe Art Museum) | series of eight prints by Hokusai; Evening Moon at Izumisaki (泉崎夜月), Sound of Lake Rinkai (臨海湖声), Bamboo Hedge at Kume Village (粂村竹籬), Pines and Waves at Ryūdō (龍洞松濤), Evening Glow at Jungai (筍崖夕照), Clear Autumn at Chōkō (長虹秋霽), Sacred Fountain at Castle Peak (城岳霊泉), and Banana Groves at Nakashima (中島蕉園) | | | 26°15′00″N 127°43′10″E | |
| Ryūkyū Trading Port 琉球交易港図; Ryūkyū kōekikō zu | C19 | Urasoe | Urasoe City (kept at Urasoe Art Museum) | three scrolls | | | 26°15′00″N 127°43′10″E | |
| Flowers and birds 花鳥図 kachō zu | 1710 | Urasoe | Urasoe City (kept at Urasoe Art Museum) | by Sonoku (孫億) | | | 26°15′00″N 127°43′10″E | |
| Proof Prints for Eight Views of Ryūkyū 琉球八景校合摺り; Ryūkyū hakkei kyōgōzuri | c. 1832 | Urasoe | Urasoe City (kept at Urasoe Art Museum) | set of eight from the blocks used to print the outlines | | | 26°15′00″N 127°43′10″E | |

== See also ==
- Cultural Properties of Japan
- List of National Treasures of Japan (paintings)
- Japanese painting
- List of Museums in Okinawa Prefecture
