= List of cultural properties of Japan – sculptures (Okinawa) =

This list is of the cultural properties of Japan designated in the category of sculptures (彫刻, chōkoku) for the Prefecture of Okinawa.

== National Cultural Properties ==
As of 1 February 2015, zero Important Cultural Properties have been designated.

== Prefectural Cultural Properties ==
As of 1 May 2014, eleven properties have been designated at a prefectural level.

Property	Date	Municipality	Ownership	Comments	Image	Coordinates	Ref.
Urasoe Yōdore Stone Zushi 浦添ようどれ石厨子; Urasoe yōdore ishi-zushi	C15	Urasoe	Urasoe City	four stone sarcophagi, of green tuff from Fujian; decoration on the four sides includes Buddhist figures and treasures, shisa, deer, birds, and flowers, while the lids imitate tiled roofs, with dragon and phoenix tile ends		26°14′51″N 127°43′54″E	for all refs see
Sōgen-ji Stele with Instructions to Dismount from Horse 崇元寺下馬碑; Sōgenji geba-hi	1527	Naha	Naha City			26°13′13″N 127°41′26″E	
Tōrin-ji Niō 桃林寺仁王像; Tōrinji niō zō	1737	Ishigaki	Tōrin-ji (桃林寺)	two statues of Magnolia compressa wood (オガタマノキ); after the 1771 Great Yaeyama Tsunami they were recovered from the coast of Sakieda Bay (崎枝湾)		24°20′38″N 124°09′20″E	
Enkaku-ji Wooden Elephant and Ofuda 木彫円覚寺白象並びに趣意書木札 mokuchō Enkakuji byakuzō narabini shui-sho mokusatsu		Naha	Okinawa Prefecture (kept at the Okinawa Prefectural Museum and Art Museum)			26°13′38″N 127°41′38″E	
Parapet of Yomochi Bridge 世持橋勾欄羽目; Yomochi-bashi kōran hame		Naha	Okinawa Prefecture (kept at the Okinawa Prefectural Museum and Art Museum)			26°13′38″N 127°41′38″E	
Parapet of the Stone Bridge over Hōjō Pond at Enkaku-ji 円覚寺放生池石橋勾欄; Enkakuji Hōjō-chi ishibashi kōran		Naha	Okinawa Prefecture			26°13′06″N 127°43′09″E	
Tamaudun Stone Lions 玉陵石彫獅子; Tamaudun sekichō shishi		Naha	Naha City	pair of lions		26°13′05″N 127°42′53″E	
Izena Tamaudun Stone Zushi 伊是名玉御殿内石厨子; Izena Tamaudun nai ishizushi		Izena	Izena Village	two miniature shrines		26°54′57″N 127°57′06″E	
Oroku Tomb Stone Zushi 小禄墓内石厨子; Oroku baka nai ishizushi		Ginowan	private			26°15′25″N 127°44′16″E	
Tamaudun Stele 玉陵碑; Tamaudun hi		Naha	Naha City			26°13′05″N 127°42′53″E	
Wooden Sculpture Fragments from Enkaku-ji 旧円覚寺関係木彫資料 kyū-Enkakuji kankei mokuchō shiryō		Naha	Okinawa Prefecture (kept at the Okinawa Prefectural Museum and Art Museum)	35 items		26°13′38″N 127°41′38″E	

== Municipal Cultural Properties ==
As of 1 May 2014, six properties have been designated at a municipal level.

Property	Date	Municipality	Ownership	Comments	Image	Coordinates	Ref.
Oroku Tomb Stone Censer 小禄墓石彫香炉; Oroku baka sekichō kōro		Ginowan	private			26°15′25″N 127°44′16″E	for all refs see
Oroku Tomb Stone Lions 小禄墓石彫獅子; Oroku baka sekichō shishi		Ginowan	private			26°15′25″N 127°44′16″E	
Teruya Stone Lions 照屋の石彫獅子; Teruya no sekichō shishi		Itoman	Teruya District			26°07′50″N 127°40′51″E	
Buddhist Sculptures by Dana Sōkei 田名宗経謹刻の仏像; Dana Sōkei kinkoku Butsu zō		Itoman	private (kept at Renge-in (蓮華院))			26°07′47″N 127°40′19″E	
Tōteikun 土帝君(トートク)3体; Tōteikun (tōtoku)		Izena	Shomi District	3 images		26°55′56″N 127°56′56″E	
Tōteikun 土帝君(トートク)3体; Tōteikun (tōtoku)		Izena	Serikyaku District	3 images		26°55′55″N 127°55′34″E	

== See also ==
- Cultural Properties of Japan
- List of National Treasures of Japan (sculptures)
- List of Historic Sites of Japan (Okinawa)
- List of Cultural Properties of Japan - paintings (Okinawa)
