= National Theatre Okinawa =

- 国立劇場おきなわ
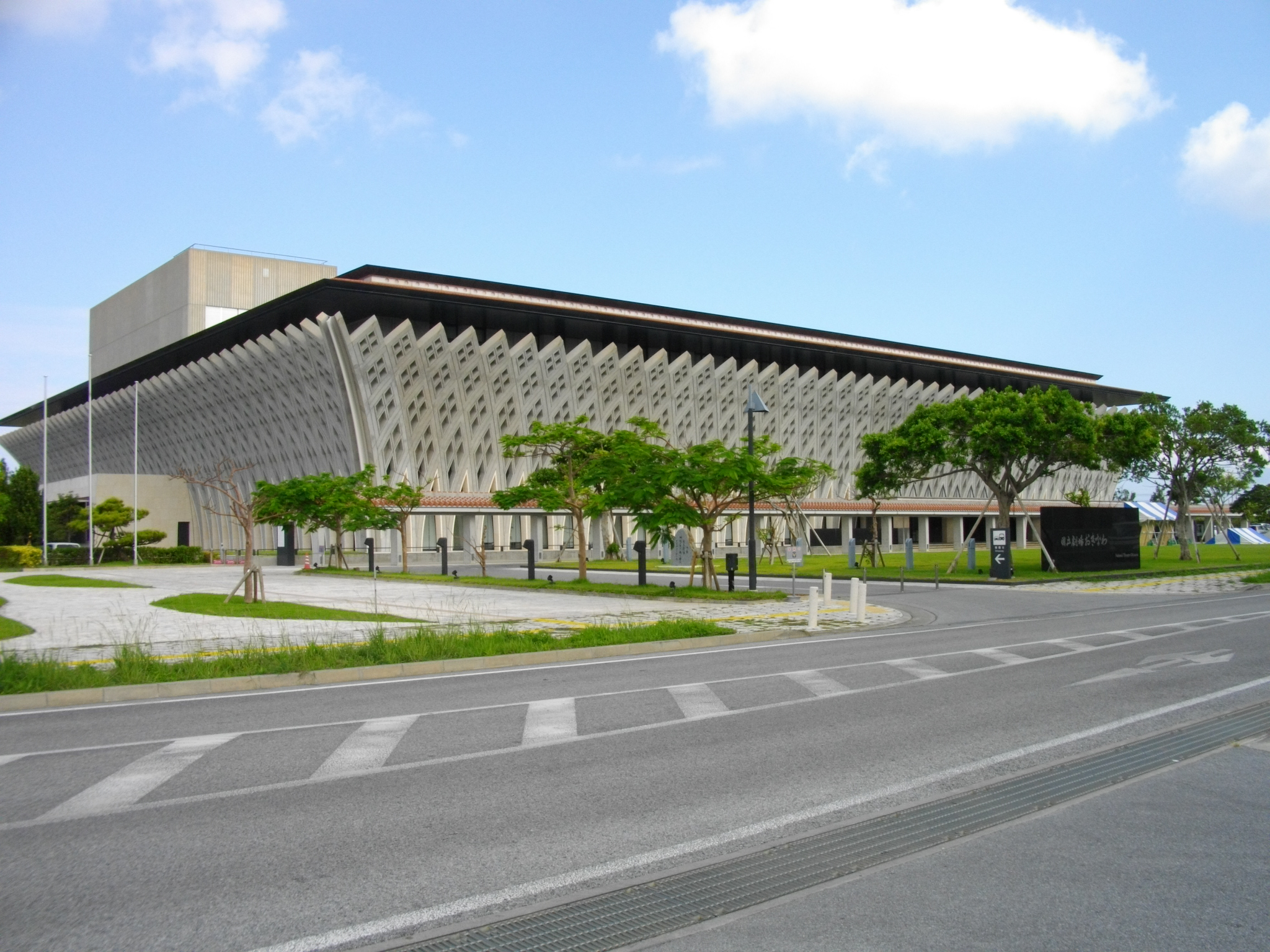
- Interactive map of National Theatre Okinawa
- Address: 4-14-1 Jitchaku; Urasoe, Okinawa Prefecture; Japan
- Coordinates: 26°14′47″N 127°41′19″E
- Capacity: 632 (Large Theatre); 255 (Small Hall)

Construction
- Opened: 18 January 2004

Website
- Official website

National Theatre Okinawa (国立劇場おきなわ, Kokuritsu Gejō Okinawa) opened in Urasoe, Okinawa Prefecture, Japan, in January 2004. The main auditorium seats 632 and there is also a smaller hall with a capacity of 255. In addition to performances of Kumi Odori and Ryūkyūan music and dance, there are initiatives to document, preserve, and promote Okinawa's performing arts (in particular, Kumi Odori), as well as related exchange programmes across the Asia-Pacific region.

== See also ==
- List of Intangible Cultural Properties of Japan (Okinawa)
- National Theatre of Japan
- Ryūkyū Kingdom
- Eisa (dance)
- Buyō
