= Tennō-ji =

Tennō-ji may refer to:

- Tennō-ji (Taitō) (天王寺), a temple located in Taitō, Tokyo
- Tennō-ji (Naha) (天王寺), a closed temple located in Naha, Okinawa

== See also ==
- Tennōji-ku, Osaka
- Tennōji Station
- Tennōji Park
- Tennōji Zoo
