= Tenkaichi =

Tenkaichi or similar terms may refer to:

- Tenkaichi Bushi Keru Nagūru (天下一武士 ケルナグール, lit. The Greatest Warrior on Earth - Kick and Punch), a 1989 fighting video game
- Tenkaichi Junior (天下一Jr., Tenkaichi Junior), starting in 2002, an annual professional wrestling round-robin tournament
- Dragon Ball Z: Budokai Tenkaichi, released in Japan as Dragon Ball Z: Sparking! (ドラゴンボールZ Sparking!), a series of fighting games that debuted in 2005
- Tenkaichi: The Greatest Warrior Under the Rising Sun (テンカイチ 日本最強武芸者決定戦, Tenkaichi: Nihon Saikyō Bugeisha Ketteisen), a Japanese manga first published in 2021

== See also ==
- Tenkai-ji (天界寺), a Rinzai Buddhist temple and royal bodaiji of the Ryūkyū Kingdom
