= Bridge of Nations Bell =

15th century bronze bell in Okinawa, Japan

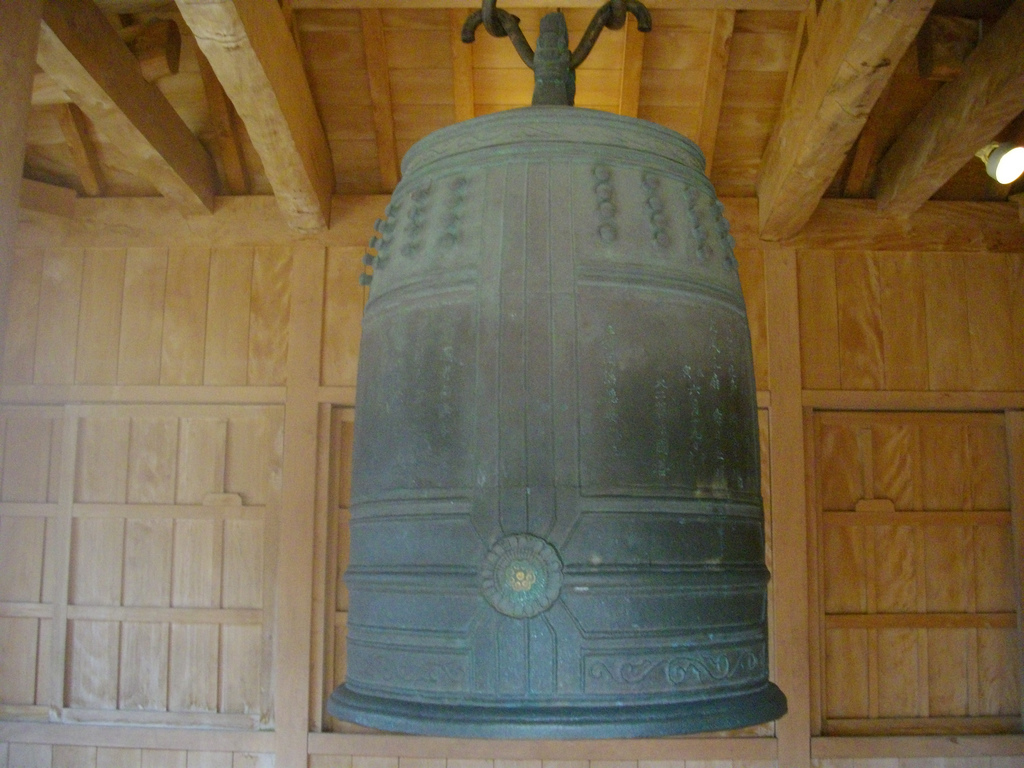
The replica of the Bridge of Nations Bell, at Shuri Castle.

The Bridge of Nations Bell (Japanese: 万国津梁の鐘, Hepburn: Bankoku shinryō no kane) is a bronze bell associated with the Ryūkyū Kingdom. As inscripted in the bell, it was Built by Carpenter Fujiwara no Kuniyoshi (藤原国善), and words were given by the chief priest Keiin An Sen (渓隠安潜) at Rinzaisyu Sokokuji Temple (臨済宗相国寺).

== History ==
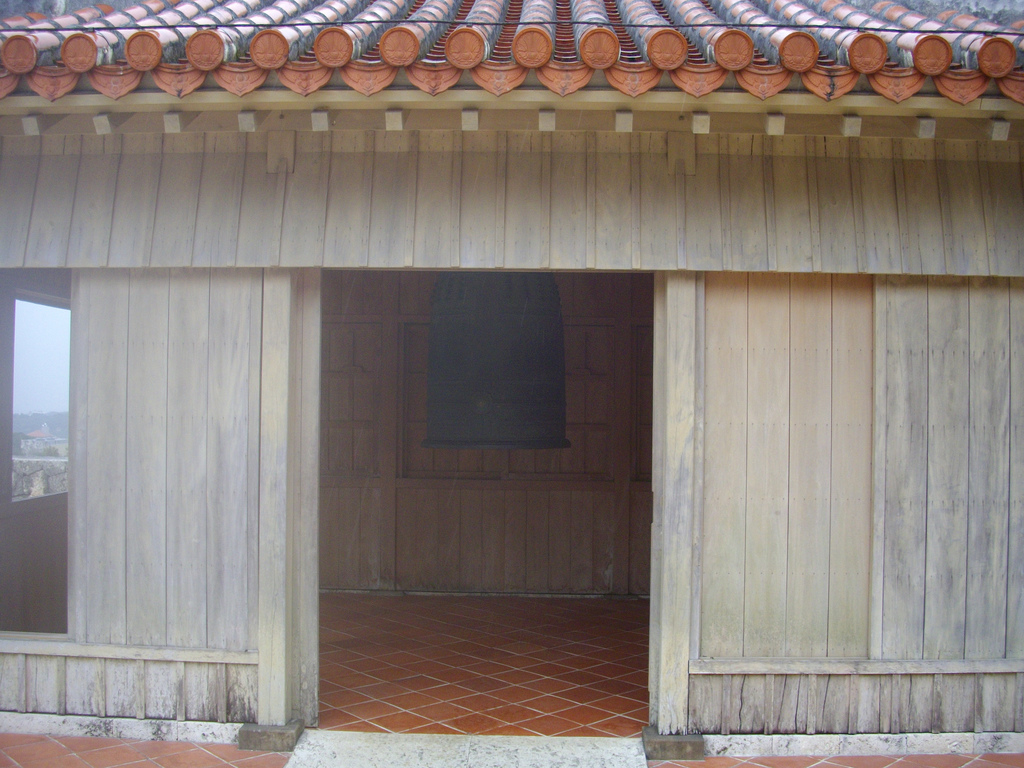
The reconstructed Tomoya, on the grounds of Shuri Castle, which today houses a replica of the Bell.

The bell was cast in 1458, during the reign of King Shō Taikyū, and hung at the Seiden (main hall) of Shuri Castle.

The bell is 154.9 cm high, with an opening 93.1 cm in diameter, and weighs 721 kilograms.

Blackened and damaged by Allied bombs and guns during the 1945 battle of Okinawa, the bell miraculously survived largely intact. It is, however, no longer rung.

Nationally designated as an Important Cultural Property in 1978, the bell is today in the collection of the Okinawa Prefectural Museum; a full-size replica hangs at the castle site. It remains unclear, however, just where in or around the Seiden it was originally hung. The replica bell currently hangs outside the second bailey or courtyard (Okinawan: shicha nu una), in a structure called the Tomoya, which has been reconstructed based on historical plans, maps, and images, but the original purpose of which is unknown.

== Name ==
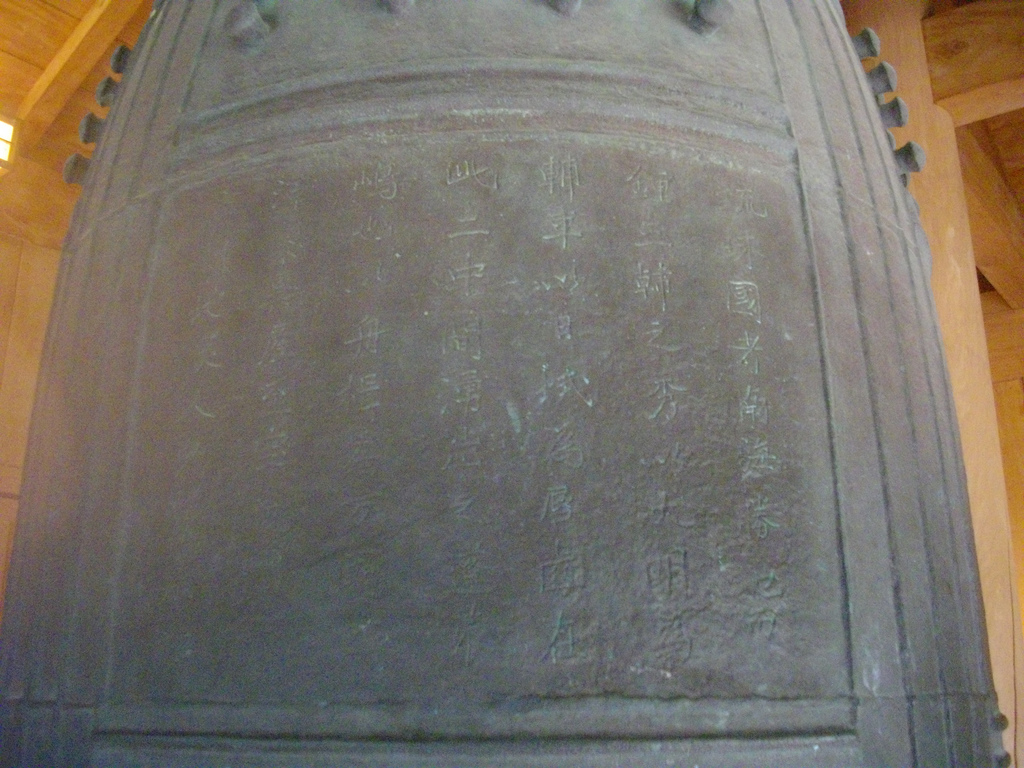
The inscription on the replica bell.

The bell is quite commonly referred to as the "Bridge of Nations Bell" in English. This term is derived from a translation of the term typically used in Japanese to refer to the bell: 万国津梁の鐘 (Bankoku shinryō no kane). Bankoku, lit. "10,000 nations," really refers to "all the nations" or "the great many nations." Shinryō literally translates to "a beam across the port/harbor"; thus, "a bridge." Finally, kane refers to a bell of this type and style.

This Japanese name for the bell, in turn, derives from the inscription upon it, which describes Ryūkyū's prominence in the 14th-16th centuries in maritime trade in the South Seas and prosperous trade relations with China, Korea, Japan, and the various states of Southeast Asia.

While it is most commonly known as Bankoku shinryō no kane in Japanese, the official name of the bell is "Former Bell of the Shuri Castle Seiden" (旧首里城正殿鐘, kyū Shuri-jō Seiden (no) kane).

== Inscription ==
A summarized translation of the inscription might be given as follows:

The Kingdom of Ryūkyū is a splendid place in the South Seas, with close intimate relations with the Three Nations of China, Korea, and Japan, between which it is located, and which express much admiration for these islands. Journeying to various countries by ship, the Kingdom forms a bridge between all the nations, filling its land with the precious goods and products of foreign lands; in addition, the hearts of its people emulate the virtuous civilization of Japan and China.
