= List of Intangible Cultural Properties of Japan (Okinawa) =

This list is of the Intangible Cultural Properties of Japan in the Prefecture of Okinawa.

== National Cultural Properties ==
As of 1 January 2015, eleven Important Intangible Cultural Properties have been designated, being of national significance.

=== Performing Arts ===
Property	Holder	Comments	Image	Ref.
Kumi Odori 組踊; Kumi odori	Traditional Kumi Odori Preservation Society (伝統組踊保存会)	inscribed by UNESCO on the Representative List of the Intangible Cultural Heritage of Humanity		
Ryukyuan Classical Music 琉球古典音楽; Ryūkyū koten ongaku	Shimabukuro Masao (島袋正雄), Terukina Chōichi (照喜名朝一)			
Kumi Odori Music - Uta-Sanshin 組踊音楽歌三線; Kumi odori ongaku uta sanshin	Shiroma Tokutarō (城間德太郎), Nishie Kishun (西江喜春)			
Kumi Odori - Tachikata 組踊立方; Kumi odori tachikata	Miyagi Nōhō (宮城能鳳)			
Ryūkyū Dance 琉球舞踊; Ryūkyū buyō	Ryūkyū Dance Preservation Society (琉球舞踊保存会)			

=== Craft Techniques ===
Property	Holder	Comments	Image	Ref.
Kijoka Bashōfu 喜如嘉の芭蕉布; Kijoka no bashōfu	Kijoka Bashōfu Preservation Society (喜如嘉の芭蕉布保存会)			
Miyako Jōfu 宮古上布; Miyako jōfu	Miyako Jōfu Preservation Society (宮古上布保持団体)	processes include hand spinning of the ramie, indigo dyeing, weaving, washing, and repairs; the cloth was used for poll tax payments from 1637		
Bingata 紅型 bingata	Tamanaha Yūkō (玉那覇有公)			
Shuri-no-Orimono 首里の織物; Shuri no orimono	Miyahara Hatsuko (宮平初子)	textile technique		
Bashōfu 芭蕉布 bashōfu	Taira Toshiko (平良敏子)	banana fibre textile technique		
Kumejima Tsumugi 久米島紬; Kumejima tsumugi	Kumejima Tsumugi Preservation Society (久米島紬保持団体)			

== Prefectural Cultural Properties ==
As of 1 May 2014, fourteen properties have been designated at a prefectural level.

=== Performing Arts ===
Property	Holder	Comments	Image	Ref.
Okinawan Traditional Dance 沖縄伝統舞踊; Okinawa dentō buyō	Okinawan Traditional Dance Preservation Society (沖縄伝統舞踊保存会)			
Okinawan Traditional Music - Nomura Ryū 沖縄伝統音楽野村流; Okinawa dentō ongaku Nomura-ryū	Okinawan Traditional Music Nomura Ryū Preservation Society (沖縄伝統音楽野村流保存会)			
Okinawan Traditional Music - Afuso Ryū 沖縄伝統音楽安冨祖流; Okinawa dentō ongaku Afuso-ryū	Okinawan Traditional Music Afuso Ryū Preservation Society (沖縄伝統音楽安冨祖流保存会)			
Okinawan Traditional Music - Tansui Ryū 沖縄伝統音楽湛水流; Okinawa dentō ongaku Tansui-ryū	Okinawan Traditional Music Tansui Ryū Preservation Society (沖縄伝統音楽湛水流保存会協議会)			
Okinawan Traditional Music - Sōkyoku 沖縄伝統音楽箏曲; Okinawa dentō ongaku sōkyoku	Okinawan Traditional Music Sōkyoku Preservation Society (沖縄伝統音楽箏曲保存会)			
Yaeyama Classical Min'yō 八重山古典民謡; Yaeyama koten minyō	Yaeyama Classical Min'yō Preservation Society (八重山古典民謡保持者協会)			
Ryūkyū Kageki 琉球歌劇; Ryūkyū kageki	Ryūkyū Kageki Preservation Society (琉球歌劇保存会)			
Yaeyama Traditional Dance 八重山伝統舞踊; Yaeyama dentō buyō	Morita Yoshiko (森田吉子), Yamamori Kiyo (山森キヨ), Motomori Hite (本盛ヒテ), Une Yukiko (宇根雪子)			

=== Craft Techniques ===
Property	Holder	Comments	Image	Ref.
Bingata 紅型 bingata	Shiroma Eijun (城間榮順), Tamanaha Michiko (玉那覇道子), Fujimura Reiko (藤村玲子), Kinjō Shōtarō (金城昌太郎), Chinen Sekigen (知念績元), Kiyuna Morizō (喜友名盛蔵), Nishihira Sachiko (西平幸子)			
True Shuri-no-Orimono 本場首里の織物 honba Shuri no orimono	Shukumine Kyōko (祝嶺恭子), Tawada Yoshiko (多和田淑子), Le Bars Miyahira Ginko (ルバース・ミヤヒラ・吟子)			
Yomitan Hanaori 読谷山花織; Yomitanzan hanaori or Yuntanza hanaui	Higa Emiko (比嘉恵美子), Shimabukuro Shū (島袋秀), Ikehara Keiko (池原ケイ子)	textile technique; an Important Intangible Cultural Property from 1999 until 2003, when it was removed from the national register upon the death of holder Yonamine Sada (與那嶺貞)		
Yaeyama Jōfu 八重山上布; Yaeyama jōfu	Arakaki Sachiko (新垣幸子), Nakamura Sumiko (中村澄子), Taira Yōko (平良蓉子), Itokazu Emiko (糸数江美子), Matsutake Kimiko (松竹喜生子)	textile technique		
Ryūkyū Lacquerware 琉球漆器; Ryūkyū shikki	Maeda Takayoshi (前田孝允), Kinjō Yuiki (金城唯喜)			

=== Karate - Kobujutsu ===
Property	Holder	Comments	Image	Ref.
Okinawan Karate and Kobujutsu 沖縄の空手・古武術; Okinawa no karate・ko-bujutsu	Ishikawa Tadashi (石川精徳), Uehara Takenobu (上原武信), Hichiya Yoshio (比知屋義夫), Nakamoto Masahiro (仲本政博), Higaonna Morio (東恩納盛男)			

== Municipal Cultural Properties ==
As of 1 May 2014, seven properties have been designated at a municipal level.

=== Performing Arts ===
Property	Holder	Comments	Image	Ref.
Tinbe and Kamanti ティンベーとカマンティ tinbē to kamanti	Tinbe and Kamanti Preservation Society (ティンベー・カマンティー保存会)	Tinbe is fighting with spear and shield, Kamanti with sickle and staff; performed on the 17th day of 7th month and 15th day of 8th month of the old lunar calendar; Cultural Property of Nanjō		
Amanchu 天人; Amanchu	Tsuhako District (津波古区)	reenactment of legend of a giant who taught the local elder and his grandchild how to grow crops; Cultural Property of Nanjō		
Bōjutsu 棒術 bōjutsu	Tsuhako Old Bōjutsu Preservation Society (津波古棒術保存会)	Cultural Property of Nanjō		
Munjuru Bushi むんじゅる節 munjuru bushi	Aguni Village	Cultural Property of Aguni		

=== Craft Techniques ===
Property	Holder	Comments	Image	Ref.
Tsuboya Ware 壺屋焼; Tsuboya-yaki	Tsuboya Ware Preservation Society (壷屋焼物保存会)	Cultural Property of Naha		
Ryūkyū Kasuri and Haebaru Hanaori 琉球絣と南風原花織; Ryūkyū kasuri to Haebaru hanaori	Ryūkyū Kasuri and Haebaru Hanaori Preservation Society (琉球絣と南風原花織保存会)	Cultural Property of Haebaru		

=== Oral Literature ===
Property	Holder	Comments	Image	Ref.
Folk Tales of Yamamoto Senkō 山本川恒の民話; Yamamoto Senkō no minwa	Yamamoto Senkō (山本川恒) (deceased)	Cultural Property of Nago		

== Former Cultural Properties ==
=== Performing Arts ===
Property	Holder	Comments	Image	Ref.
Kumi Odori Music - Taiko 組踊音楽太鼓; Kumi odori ongaku taiko		removed from the national register in 2006 upon the death of holder Shimabukuro Mitsufumi (島袋光史)		

=== Craft Techniques ===
Property	Holder	Comments	Image	Ref.
Ryūkyū Pottery 琉球陶器; Ryūkyū tōki		removed from the national register in 2004 upon the death of holder Kinjō Jirō (金城次郎)		

== Intangible Cultural Properties that need measures such as making records ==
As of 1 May 2014, there was one Intangible Cultural Property that needs measures such as making records (記録作成等の措置を講ずべき無形文化財).

=== Craft Techniques ===
Property	Holder	Comments	Image	Ref.
Tsuboya Arayachi Ware 壷屋の荒焼; Tsuboya no arayachi		Tsuboya ware is generally divided into two: the unglazed arayachi (sometimes given a manganese glaze) and glazed jōyachi (上焼); at the end of the seventeenth century the royal government moved the Chibana kilns from Misato, the Takaraguchi kilns from Shuri, and the Wakuta kilns from Naha to Tsuboya; in 1897 there were forty arayachi kilns, after the war two, and there is now one		

== See also ==
- Cultural Properties of Japan
- List of Cultural Properties of Japan - crafts (Okinawa)
- Angama (dance)
