= Kumejima Museum =

- 久米島博物館
- Interactive map of the Kumejima Museum area

General information
- Location: 542 Kadekaru, Kumejima, Okinawa Prefecture, Japan
- Coordinates: 26°20′30″N 126°45′50″E
- Opened: 2000

Website
- Official website

Kumejima Museum (久米島博物館, Kumejima hakubutsukan), formerly the Kumejima Centre for Nature and Culture (久米島自然文化センター), opened in 2000 in Kumejima, Okinawa Prefecture, Japan. It displays exhibits relating to the natural and cultural history of Kume Island.

== See also ==
- Okinawa Prefectural Museum
- List of Natural Monuments of Japan (Okinawa)
