= Nago Museum =

- 名護博物館
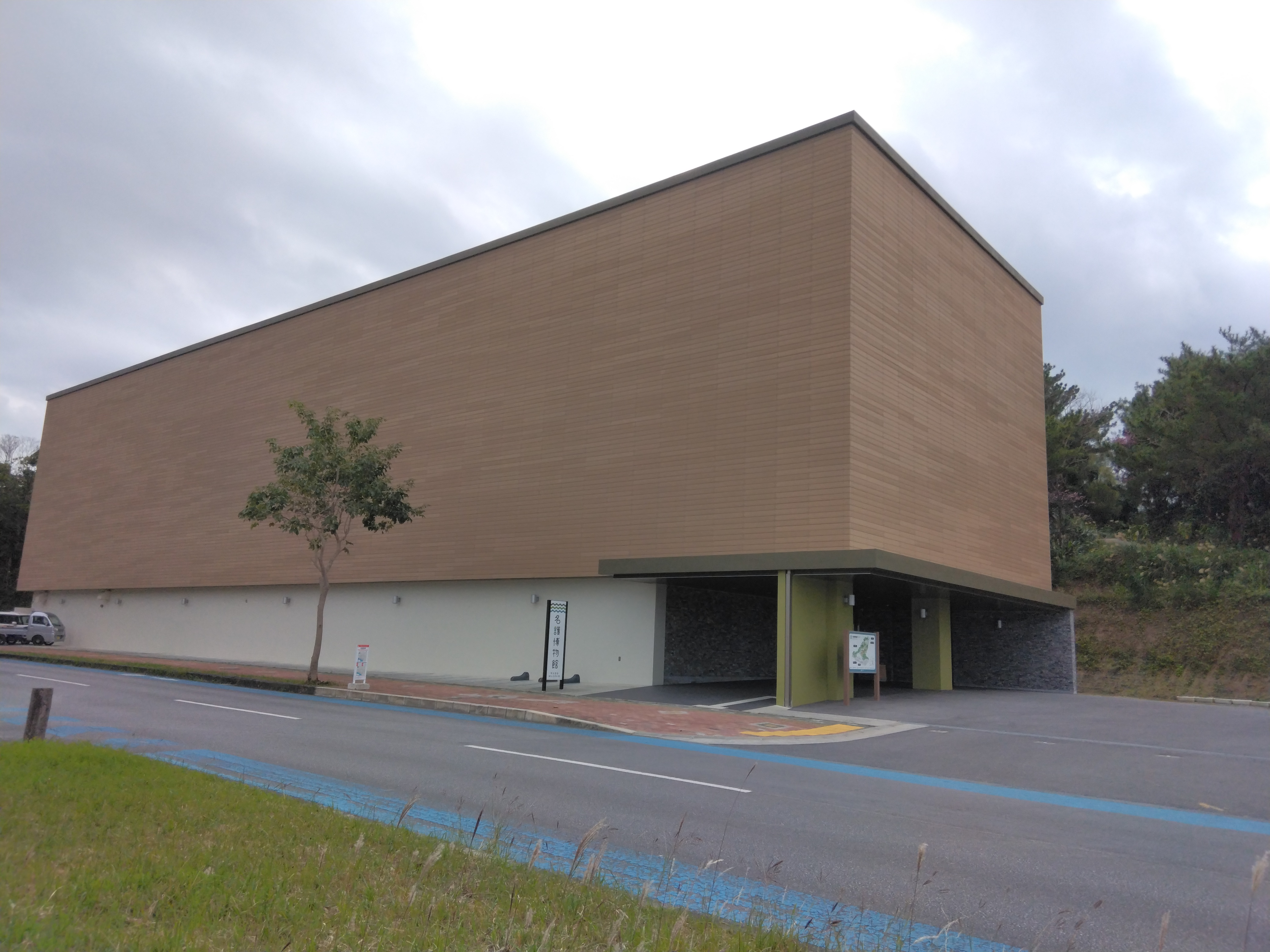
- Interactive map of the Nago Museum area

General information
- Location: 4-20-50 Ōnaka, Nago, Okinawa Prefecture, Japan
- Coordinates: 26°35′53″N 127°59′16″E
- Opened: 1 March 1984

Website
- ja

Nago Museum (名護博物館, Nago hakubutsukan) opened in 1984 in Nago, Okinawa Prefecture, Japan. The collection covers natural as well as cultural history and includes the shell of a giant clam which weighs over two hundred kilograms. In May 2023, the relocated museum reopened in a new facility, built with a total construction cost of ¥2.4 billion.

== See also ==
- Okinawa Prefectural Museum
