= Urasoe Art Museum =

- 浦添市美術館
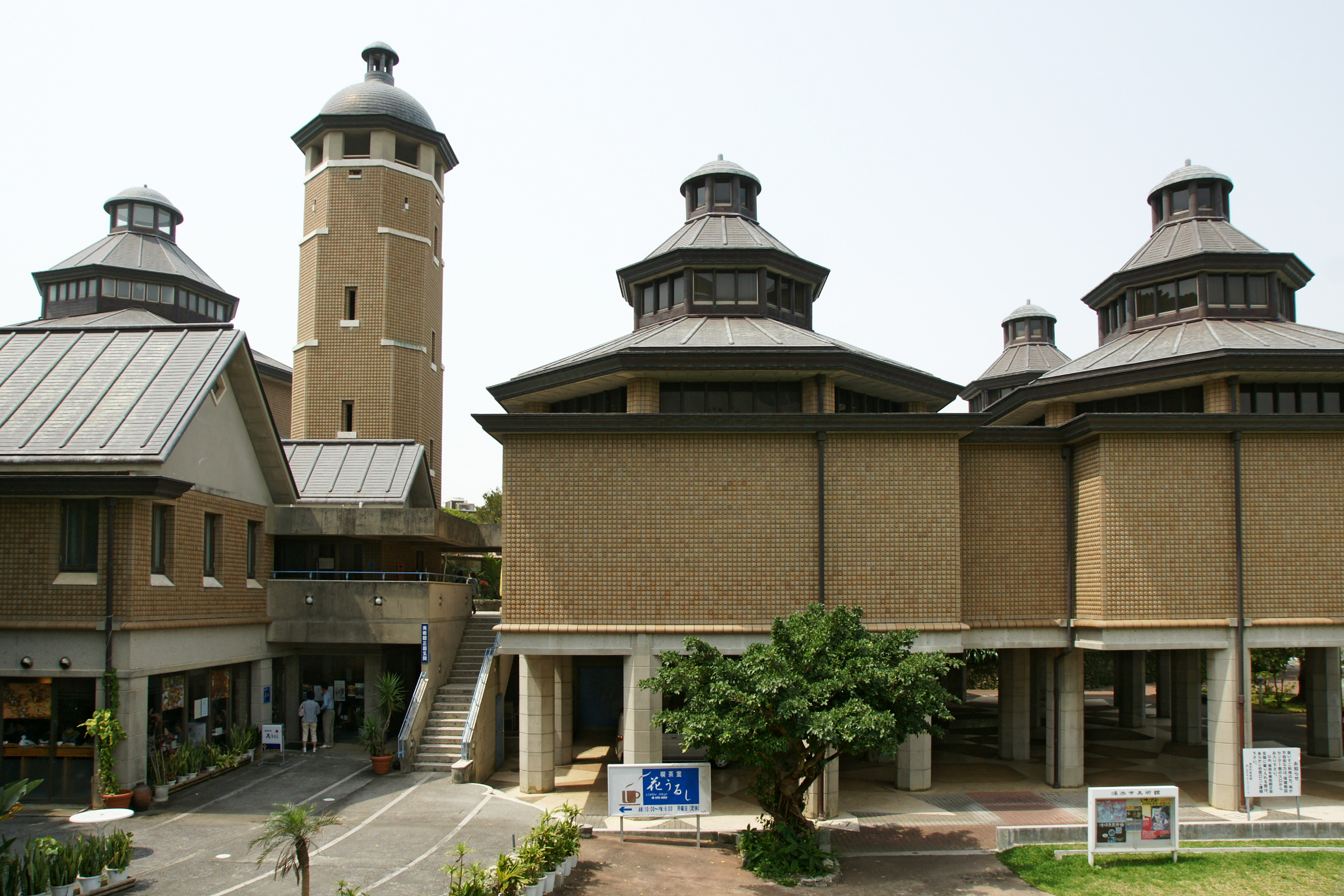
- Interactive map of the Urasoe Art Museum area

General information
- Location: 1-9-2 Nakama, Urasoe, Okinawa Prefecture, Japan
- Coordinates: 26°15′00″N 127°43′10″E
- Opened: 1 February 1990

Design and construction
- Architect: Shōzō Uchii

Website
- English Summary

Urasoe Art Museum (浦添市美術館, Urasoe-shi bijutsukan) opened in 1990 in Urasoe, Okinawa Prefecture, Japan. The collection has a particular focus upon Ryukyu lacquerware.

== See also ==
- Okinawa Prefectural Museum
