= Tennō-ji (Okinawa) =

Buddhist temple in Naha, Okinawa, Japan

Tennō-ji 天王寺

Religion
- Affiliation: Rinzai Zen
- Deity: Vaiśravaṇa
- Status: Closed as of 1879

Location
- Location: Shuri Tōnokura 2-18, Naha, Okinawa prefecture
- Country: Japan

Architecture
- Completed: c. 1465 - 1487

Tennō-ji (天王寺) was a Rinzai Buddhist temple and royal bodaiji of the Ryūkyū Kingdom, located in Naha, Okinawa.

Tennō-ji was the house of Shō En before he ascended the throne. Shō Shin was born here. The house changed in usage and became a Buddhist temple during the reign of King Shō Shin (r. 1477–1526). It also used as bodaiji of Ryukyuan queens. Ryukyuan king should visit Enkaku-ji, Tennō-ji and Tenkai-ji after his genpuku and investiture.

Ryukyu was annexed by Japan in 1879, and Tennō-ji was closed in the same year and buddharupa, spirit tablets and bonshō were moved to Enkaku-ji. The main hall (本殿, Honden) was used as a classroom of a school; the western part of the temple was bought by Methodists who built a church on it. It was destroyed in the 1945 battle of Okinawa.

== See also ==
- Enkaku-ji (Okinawa)
- Tenkai-ji
- Sōgen-ji
