= Tenkai-ji =

Buddhist temple in Naha, Okinawa, Japan

Tenkai-ji Okinawan: 天界寺
- Tinkee-ži

Religion
- Affiliation: Rinzai Zen
- Status: Closed as of 1879

Location
- Location: Shuri Kinjō 1-2, Naha, Okinawa prefecture
- Country: Japan

Architecture
- Founder: Keiin Ansen
- Completed: c. 1450 - 1457

Tenkai-ji (Okinawan: 天界寺 was a Rinzai Buddhist temple and royal bodaiji of the Ryūkyū Kingdom, located in Naha, Okinawa.

The temple was erected by Keiin Ansen (渓隠安潜) during the reign of King Shō Taikyū (r. 1454–1460). The Mahavira Hall was built in 1466, a bonshō (Buddhist bell) was cast in 1469 and hung at it.

The temple was used as bodaiji of kings during the first Shō Dynasty. In the second Shō Dynasty, it was used as bodaiji of unmarried Ryukyuan princes and princesses. Ryukyuan kings would visit Enkaku-ji, Tennō-ji and Tenkai-ji after their genpuku and investiture.

Ryukyu was annexed by Japan in 1879, and Tenkai-ji was closed in the same year. It was destroyed in the 1945 battle of Okinawa.

== See also ==
- Enkaku-ji
- Tennō-ji
- Sōgen-ji
