= Sōgen-ji =

Former Buddhist temple in the Ryukyu Islands

Coordinates: 26°13′13.2″N 127°41′26.1″E

- 崇元寺 (Okinawan)
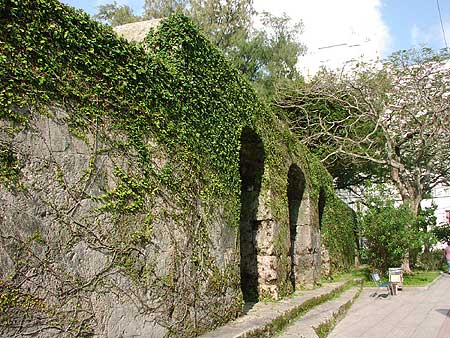
- Sōgen-ji stone gate

- Location within Okinawa Prefecture Location within Japan
- Type: Buddhist temple ruins
- Location: Naha, Okinawa, Japan

History
- Founder: King Shō Sei
- Built: 1527 AD
- National Important Cultural Property National Historic Site of Japan

Sōgen-ji (Okinawan: 崇元寺) was a Buddhist temple located in the Tomari neighborhood of the city of Naha, Okinawa Prefecture, Japan. It belonged to the Rinzai school sect of Japanese Zen. The temple's full name is Reitoku-san Sōgen-ji (Okinawan: 霊徳山 崇元寺). It was the Royal ancestral shrine of the kings of Second Shō dynasty of the Ryūkyū Kingdom. The site of the temple was designated a National Historic Site of Japan in 2025.

== Overview ==
The founding date of Sōgen-ji| is said to be either during the Xuande era (1426-1435) or the Chenghua era (1465-1487), however, based on the inscription on the "Sogenji Dismount Monument" located in front of the temple gate it was completed in 1527, the 6th year of the Jiajing era. Based on the inscription on the stone monument located in front of the temple gate, the temple was founded in 1527, shortly after King Shō Sei ascended to the throne. Prior to the investiture ceremony for the new king held at Shuri Castle, Chinese envoys held the "San'o Yusai" ceremony to console the spirit of the former king. The temple was complex of Chinese-style buildings, centered around the main temple. Anyone entering the temple grounds, including the king himself, had to dismount and enter the temple on foot out of respect for the prior sovereigns. The temple grounds were expanded at this time as well, with the construction of the massive stone gates and walls which remain today. The spirit tablets of the successive kings of the Ryūkyū Kingdom from Shunten to King Shō Tai were installed in the temple, establishing it as a royal ancestral shrine. Although the spirit tablets were installed at Sōgen-ji, the temple was not a royal mausoleum, as the graves of the kings was located at the Tama-udun a short distance from Shuri Castle. In 1699, Shō Shoku and Shō Kyū's spirit tablet were moved to Tennō-ji, Shō I's was moved to Tenkai-ji.

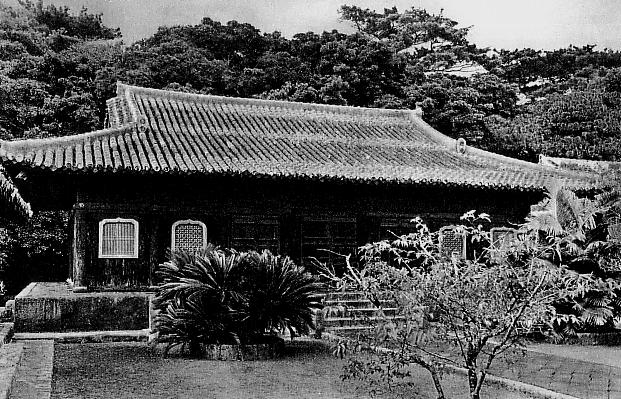
Seibyo

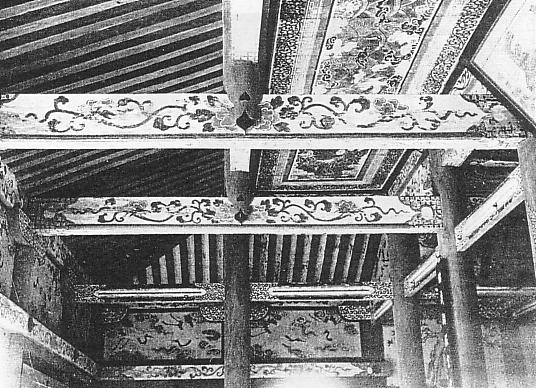
Inside Seibyo

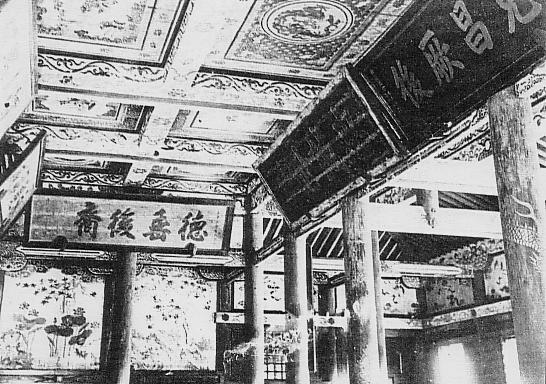
Inside Seibyo

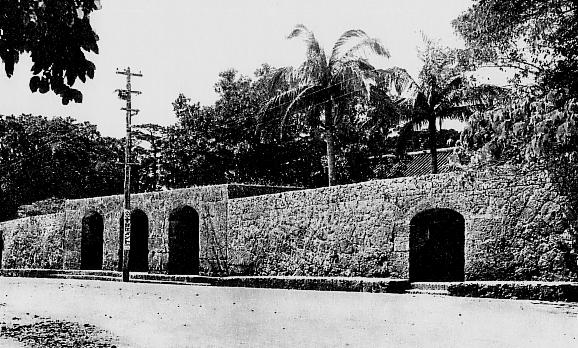
Stone gate (pre-war)

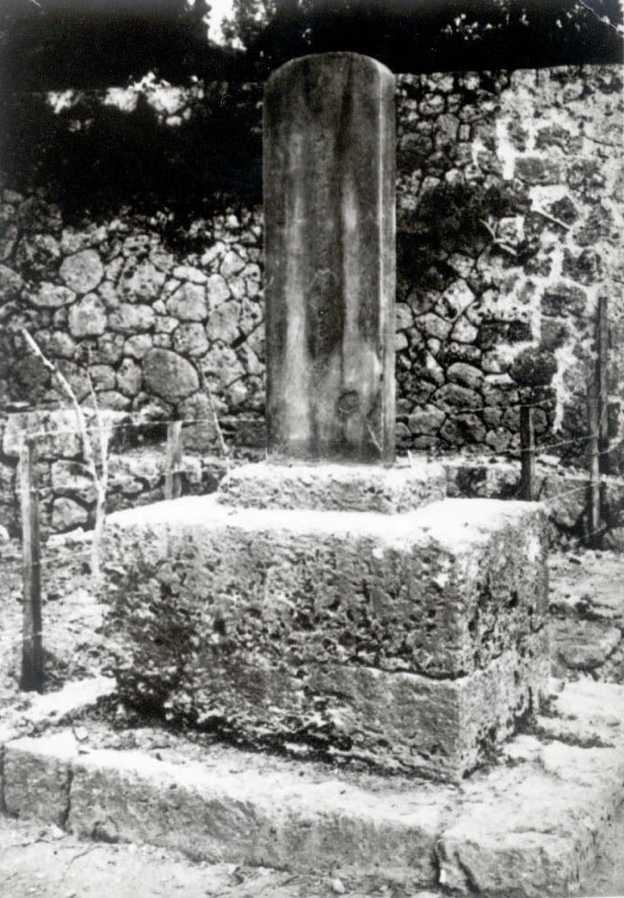
Geba stele

The main temple and stone gate were formerly designated National Treasures, but were destroyed and burned during the 1945 Battle of Okinawa. After the war, only the stone gate was restored with donations from the U.S. military and local residents, and the site of the temple became Sogenji Park. As a historic structure, the stone gate was designated a Special Important Cultural Property by the Government of the Ryukyu Islands in 1955, and was designated an Important Cultural Property in 1972 after Okinawa's return to mainland Japan. Plans have been floated by Naha City to either reconstruct the temple or to erect a museum on the site.

== Cultural Properties ==
=== National Important Cultural Properties ===
- Stone First Gate and Stone Wall (旧崇元寺第一門及び石牆), The Second Shō dynasty period (1527); It consists of a triple arched stone gate in the center of the front and stone walls surrounding it (stone walls extending 66.3m on both sides, including one side gate on each side). The design and structure is simple but imposing, and it is the only structure of its kind to combine gates and stone walls.

=== Okinawa prefecture Designated Tangible Cultural Properties ===
- Geba Stele (崇元寺下馬碑), The Second Shō dynasty period (1527); Before the war, two monuments were erected on the east and west sides of the stone gate. The west monument was lost during the Battle of Okinawa, but the east monument still stands in place.

== See also ==
- Enkaku-ji
- Tenkai-ji
- List of Historic Sites of Japan (Okinawa)
