= Enkaku-ji (Okinawa) =

Former Buddhist temple in the Ryukyu Islands

- 円覚寺; Ufutira (Okinawan)
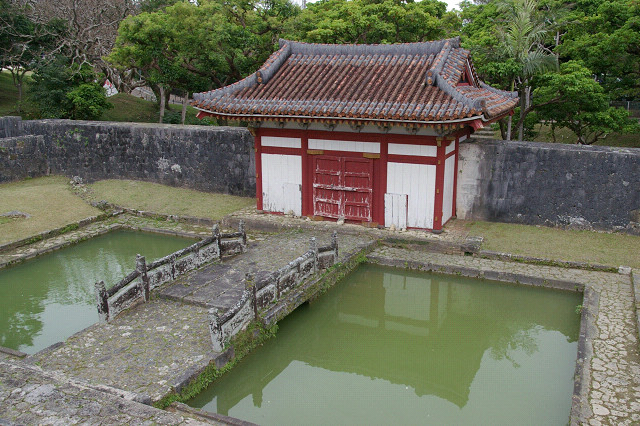
- Sōmon (general gate), Hōjō bridge (放生橋) and Hōjō pond (放生池)

- Location within Okinawa Prefecture Location within Japan
- 26°13′6″N 127°43′10″E
- Type: Buddhist temple ruins
- Location: Naha, Okinawa, Japan

History
- Founder: King Shō Shin
- Built: 1494 AD
- National Important Cultural Property National Historic Site of Japan

Enkaku-ji (円覚寺; Okinawan: ウフティラ ufutira, lit. "the great temple") was a Buddhist temple located in the Shuritonokuracho neighborhood of the city of Naha, Okinawa Prefecture, Japan. It belonged to the Rinzai school sect of Japanese Zen and its honzon is a Shaka Sanzon trinity of Shaka Nyorai, Monju Bosatsu and Fugen Bosaatsu. The temple's full name is Tentoku-san Enkaku-ji (Okinawan: 天徳山 円覚寺). It was the bodaiji of the kings of Second Shō dynasty of the Ryūkyū Kingdom. The site of the temple was designated a National Historic Site of Japan in 1972.

== Overview ==
This temple was founded in 1494 by King Shō Shin (r. 1477–1526), the first abbot being Kaiin Shōko (芥隠承琥), to pray for the repose of his father, King Shō En. Kaiin Shōko, who first introduced Rinzai Buddhism to the Ryūkyū islands from Nanzen-ji in Kyoto, but the temple itself was modeled after Engaku-ji in Kamakura. It was a full Shichidō garan and later expanded outside its original precincts with the Hojō-ike Pond and Hojō-bashi Bridge were constructed outside the temple gate, and the Enkan-chi Pond and sutra hall (later the Benzaiten-dō Hall) built in front of the temple. The temple bell (bonshō) was cast in Suō Province (present-day Hofu, Yamaguchi). It was made in 1495 and is engraved with the name "Yamato Akihide, Blacksmith and Carpenter," indicating that the temple had connections with the Ōuchi clan, who ruled Suō at the time.The temple prospered under the support of the Second Shō Dynasty, and held an extremely important position in the history of the Ryūkyū Kingdom. Ryūkyūan kings would visit Enkaku-ji, Tennō-ji and Tenkai-ji after their (genpuku and investiture. The Enkan-chi Pond was used as a venue for banquets for Chinese envoys visiting for the investure ceremonies of Ryūkyū kings.

Many of the temple's structures, including the butsuden, Sanmon Gate, and Hōjō (abbot's quarters), were designated National Treasures in 1933. However, all but the Hōjō-bashi Bridge were destroyed during the 1945 Battle of Okinawa in World War II. After the war, the site was used to build faculty housing for the University of the Ryukyus in 1948, and the university's grounds around 1965. Remaining structures, such as foundations and stone pavements, were destroyed or buried underground. The Sōmon (general gate) and Hōjō-bashi Bridge were reconstructed in 1968 and the Hōjō-chi pond repaired. The University of the Ryukyus was relocated in 1984, and work is underway to fully uncover and restore the remains. The remaining grounds, excluding the former University of the Ryukyus site, are now part of the Okinawa Prefectural University of Arts.

The government of Okinawa Prefecture began plans to reconstruct its Sanmon in 2014. However, the project was repeatedly delayed, partly due to a lack of accurate historical records, and is now scheduled for completion in 2027. Efforts are also underway to restore the two Niō statues once housed in the gate, only fragments of which remain.

Enkaku-ji once housed portrait paintings of the kings of the Second Shō Dynasty. With the end of the Ryūkyū Kingdom in the Meiji period, these were moved to Nakagusuku Palace. However, they were all lost during the Battle of Okinawa. Images remain in black-and-white photographs taken before the war, and are currently on display at Shuri Castle.

== Cultural Properties ==
=== National Important Cultural Properties ===
- Hōjō Bridge (放生橋), The Second Shō dynasty period (1498); made by Chinese stonemasons. The approach paths in front and behind the bridge, as well as the stonework and stone paving around the pond, are also designated as important cultural properties.
- Tennyō Bridge (天女橋), The Second Shō dynasty period (1502); In order to store the Square Scroll of Buddhist Sutras that were given as a gift from Korea, Enkan-chi Pond was dug in front of Enkaku-ji, and an island was constructed where a Kyōzō sutra storehouse was built. The bridge that spanned this island is Tennyōbashi, which was then called Kanrenkyō. It is a single stone arch bridge with a balustrade, with a raised floor above the central arch, and takes the form of a camel-back bridge common in southern China.
- Bonshō (梵鐘), The Second Shō dynasty period (1495, 1495, 1697 ); Enkaku-ji has three bells, all of which have Chinese era dates, but are in the Japanese style and were clearly cast in Japan.

=== Okinawa prefecture Designated Tangible Cultural Properties ===
- Sōmon (総門), The Second Shō dynasty period(1498); Niōmon-style gate
- Hōjōike Stone Bridge Railings (円覚寺放生池石橋勾欄), The Second Shō dynasty period(1498); The diabase used for the railings is imported from China, and the main pillars are decorated with small lion carvings.

== See also ==
- Tennō-ji (Okinawa)
- Tenkai-ji
- Sōgen-ji
- List of Historic Sites of Japan (Okinawa)
