= Okinawa Prefectural Museum =

Museum in Okinawa Prefecture, Japan

- 沖縄県立博物館・美術館
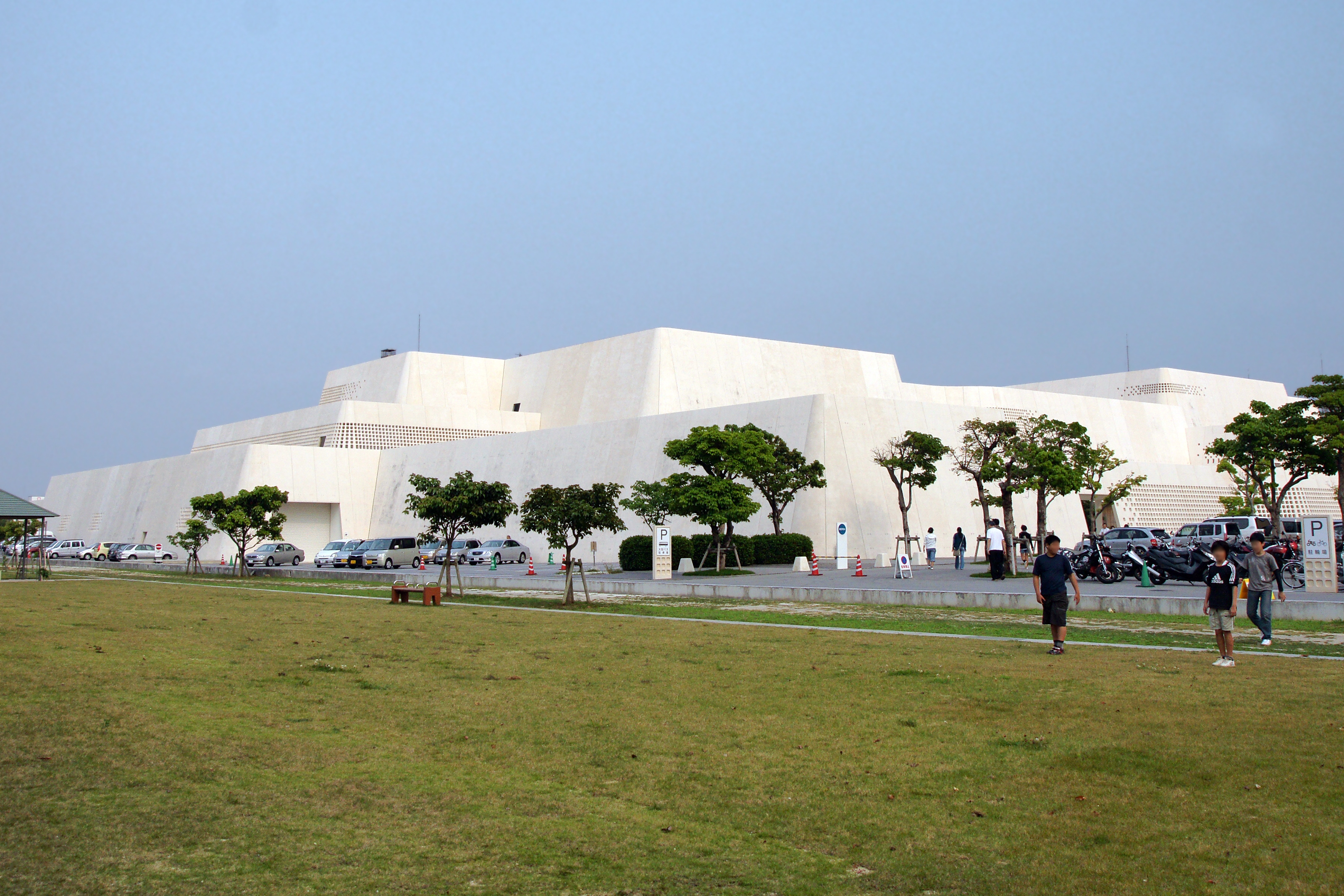
- Established: 15 May 1975 (opened at new location November 2007)
- Location: Omoro-machi, Naha, Okinawa, Japan
- Coordinates: 26.226593°N 127.694103°E
- Type: Prefectural museum
- Director: Yōichi Satoi
- Curators: Sachiko Chinen, Satoshi Tanaka (Chief Curators)
- Public transit access: Omoromachi Station, Okinawa Urban Monorail
- Website: okimu.jp

The Okinawa Prefectural Museum and Art Museum (沖縄県立博物館・美術館, Okinawa Kenritsu Hakubutsukan Bijutsukan), or Okimu for short, is a museum in the most southern prefecture of Japan. The museum complex in the Omoro-machi area of Naha, the capital city of Okinawa Prefecture. It opened in November 2007, and includes art, history, and natural history museums focusing specifically on Okinawan topics.

The museum building, constructed largely of local Okinawan limestone, was designed with the imagery of Okinawa's gusuku (castles) in mind. It contains roughly 24,000 square meters of floor space on its four above-ground levels and one basement level. The art museum and history/natural history museum are located on opposite sides of a common lobby, and visitors can buy admission to one or the other, or a combination ticket.

== History ==
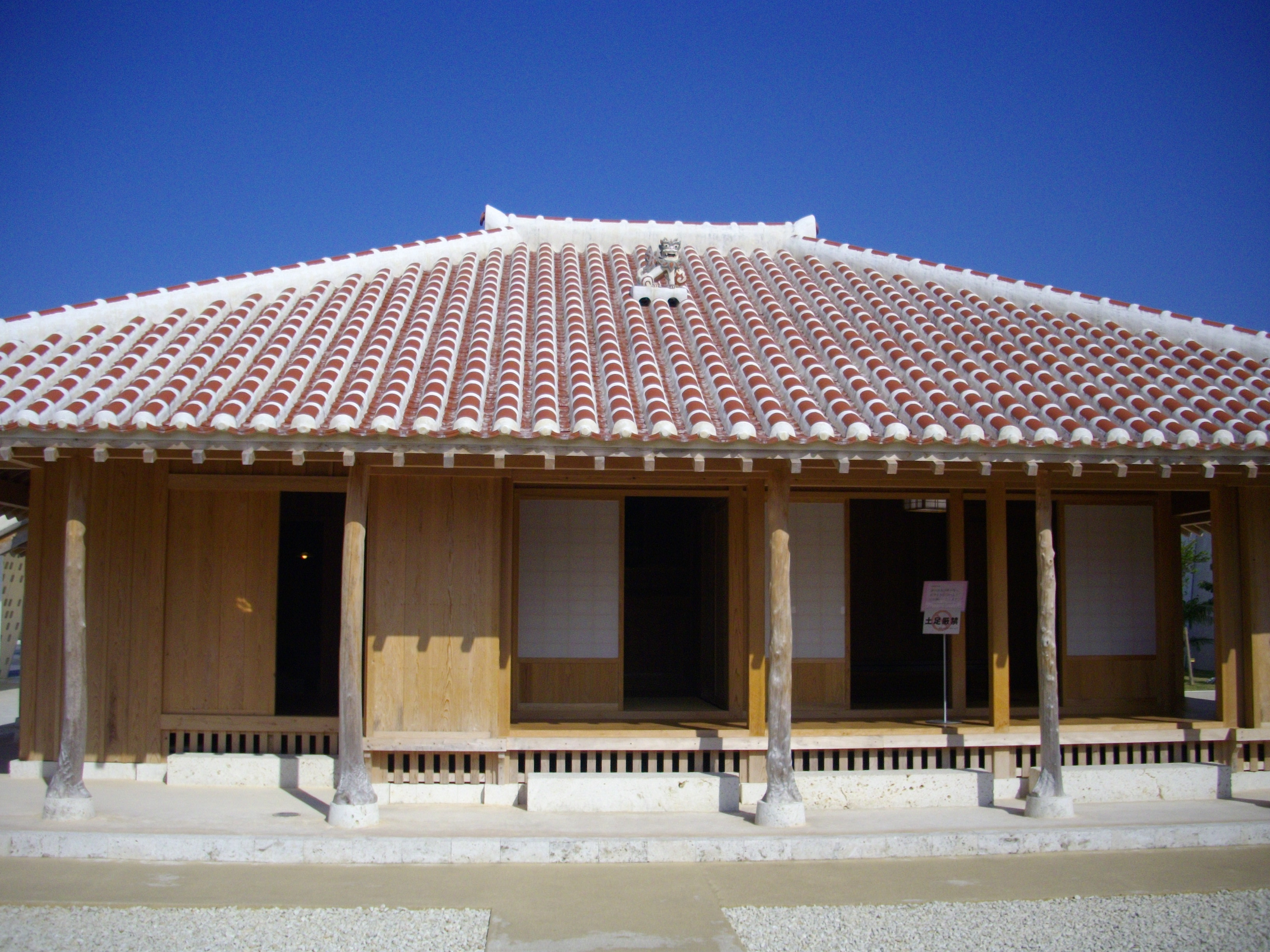
Reproduction of a traditional Okinawan home, erected in front of the museum. The red ceramic roof tiles and shisa lion-dog are particularly distinctive of traditional Okinawan architecture.

The Okinawa Prefectural Museum was originally established in May 1972, as a matter of course following the end of the US Occupation of Okinawa and its return to Japan, being primarily a renaming and reorganization of the Ryukyu Governmental Museum (琉球政府立博物館) established in 1946. It was based in the Ōnaka-chō neighborhood of Shuri, near Shuri Castle, and was closed in 2007, moving to the new site. The museum in its former incarnation focused upon Okinawan history, natural history, folk life, and related topics. The art museum included on the new site is the first prefectural art museum in Okinawa.

== Sections ==
The gardens in front of the museum include reproductions of two traditional-style Okinawan buildings – a thatch-roofed storehouse, and a traditional-style tile-roofed home – along with a number of shisa statues and other items representing Okinawa's tradition of pottery and ceramics. A sculpture garden located behind the museum features large contemporary artworks, and opens onto a large public park, Shintoshin Park.

The Natural History section of the museum is entered via a glass-floored walkway designed to look as though one is walking over coral, approaching an island. A large wrap-around screen shows short films about the geological origins of the Ryukyu Islands and about its natural environment, flora, and fauna. Several rooms cover a variety of aspects of the islands' natural environment, including numerous specimens of the islands' flora and fauna, a discussion of the dangers facing coral reefs and endangered species, and Minatogawa man, the oldest Homo sapiens specimen found in East Asia.

The History section is organized around a large map of the Ryukyu archipelago projected onto the floor and connected into a number of computer terminals allowing visitors to explore aspects of individual islands, including satellite photographs of famous sites, native flora and fauna, and local culture. The several rooms of the history section of the museum cover the entire history of the Ryukyus, from early Jōmon period culture through the return to Japanese sovereignty following the US Occupation. Numerous artifacts, art objects, and reproductions thereof are employed to illustrate the historical topics.

The Art Museum includes spaces for special temporary exhibits along with galleries displaying objects from the museum's collection. The exhibitions focus on early modern and contemporary artworks by Okinawan artists, those relating to or associated with Okinawa in some way, and a number of other works by Japanese, other Asian, and American artists. The permanent exhibits are rotated three to four times a year.

In addition to the main exhibit halls, cafe, museum shop, and auditorium, the museum includes an extensive library, and a "Hands-On Experience Room" (ふれあい体験室, fureai taiken shitsu) where visitors can explore aspects of Okinawa's natural environment and folk culture in a hands-on manner, including traditional clothing, musical instruments such as the sanshin, and a variety of puzzles and games. The museum also hosts a variety of events, including live performances, lectures, and films.

== See also ==
- Prefectural museum
