= Nishihara (Urasoe City) =

Nishihara (Japanese: 字西原, Aza Nishihara, Okinawan: Nishibaru) is an administrative division of Urasoe City in Okinawa Prefecture, Japan. The postal code is 901-2101.

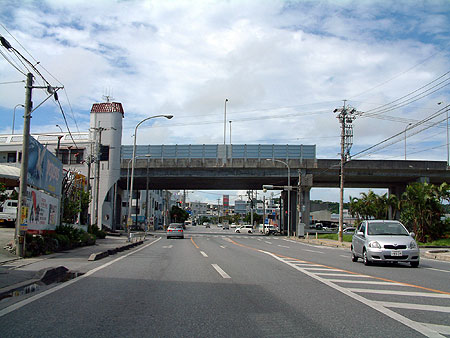
Kōei Crossing

== Geography ==
Nishihara is located in the easternmost part of Urasoe City, bordered by the administrative entities of Maeda, Tōyama, Kakazu (Ginowan City), Maehara (Ginowan City), Ganeko (Ginowan City) and Nishihara Town. It is one of the important traffic points of the South-Central part of Okinawa Island. Although the official name is Nishihara, it is generally called "Nishibaru" to prevent confusion with the neighbouring town of Nishihara. The newly developed "Uranishi Residential Area" is generally referred to as just "Uranishi".

The Yuirail Station "Tedako Uranishi Station" is in fact located in Aza Maeda, and the commercial centre "Uranishi Riubō" is in fact located in Aza Tōyama.

== History ==
=== Founding Myth ===
The founding myth for the settlement of Nishibaru links it to the one of Nakama (Japanese: 仲間) (also in Urasoe). Before the advent of the Ryūkyū Kingdom, the son of Urasoe Aji (Japanese: 浦添按司), Tokashiki Ufuyaku (Japanese: 渡嘉敷大屋子) used to live in Nakama, with his three sons. The eldest son became aji, the second son founded the household of the Nakama Noro Dunchi (Japanese: 仲間祝女殿内) and the third son founded the household known as the Mīya (Japanese: 新屋) Household. Later, a member of this Mīya Household created a lower branch and went and settled in the area that was then called "Nishibaru" (にしばるlit. "the northern field") on the northern slope of Urasoe Gusuku, below the Yōdore. This division of households and relocation in Nishibaru probably happened during the Kingdom Period, but before the Satsuma Invasion of 1609. It is said there used to be seven households living in this location. There is very little evidence to ground this myth in reality. The main argument is that the place is currently named "Furujima" (Japanese: 古島lit. "the old village"), which is traditionally the name given to the location of the former village when a village has been moved over time. There is also a well (Furujima-gā, Japanese: 古島ガー), so that it is probable there used to be a settlement in the area. However, locations of former settlements generally host a number of sacred places, utakis and / or tuns, fire gods of the first settlers... and there is no trace of such sacred places in this Furujima, which is why the myth is regarded with suspicion.

The tradition then says that since the Furujima location was not very favourable, the settlement moved below the Ugan'yama Utaki (Japanese: 拝山御嶽). Most of the sacred places of the Nishibaru settlement are located in this Ugan'yama area (Ugan'yama literally means "the mountain of prayers"), and especially the Furutanabaru-nu-taki (Japanese:古棚原之嶽) and Furutanabaru-nu-tun (Japanese: 古棚原之殿), which are mentioned in the Ryūkyū-koku Yurai-ki (Japanese: 琉球国由来記), compiled in 1713. This is a more likely place for the original location of the settlement. There is also an old well, Agari-gā (Japanese: アガリガー), that is the ubugā of the village, the water of which is used to wash the newborns.

It is said that the settlement stayed for a while at this location, before it moved in the Shīsā-mui (Japanese: シーサー森) wood, behind the Tanabaru settlement (Japanese: 棚原 currently in Nishihara Town). Links with Tanabaru seem to be quite deep, the main munchū (clan) of the settlement being called the Tanabaru Munchū and the name of the two oldest sacred places in Ugan'yama also bearing this name. However, this new location was not favourable and the settlement moved back to the original Furujima. The village did not manage to prosper in Furujima, and they came back to the foot of the Ugan'yama hill. After that last move, the settlement slid downward the hill, to reach its modern location by Kōei (Japanese: 広栄).

=== Mentions in historical documents ===
The village is mentioned in a 1621 document addressed to Shō Kyō (Japanese: 尚恭 浦添王子朝良恭).

It is the object with several other villages in Urasoe Magiri of a tax re-evaluation survey in 1628.

In 1825, a feng shui master from Kume Village made a survey for the lands of the Ichibaru Family of Nishibaru Village.

In 1830, Tanabaru Uēkata Shinyō (Japanese: 麻克昌 棚原親方眞要), of a noble household of the Ma Clan, from Shuri, was named as land lord of Nishibaru Village. Starting with his grandson, the family took the name of "Nishibaru".

In 1855, the village is mentioned during land ownership transactions.

In 1877, the daughter of Arakaki Chikudun, Kame, of Nishibaru village, is condemned to a fine of 20 kan for worshipping a statue of Amitābha.

A document of 1880 mentions the stipend attributed to the Nishibaru Ucchi (Law Officer). The criminal records of the 1890's and after mention several inhabitants of Nishibaru, fined for having illegally cut sotetsu or grasses or because of problems concerning the engagement money paid before a marriage.

=== Modern and Contemporary Periods ===
In the Modern Era, Aza Nishihara used to be a very badly deserved location in Urasoe. Not particularly involved in the industrial development, the main occupation remained agriculture, with most families engaged in sugar cane production.

Urban development occurred later: first, with the creation of the Uranishi Residential Area on the southern side of the settlement, the proportion of agricultural land decreased greatly. The construction of the bypass for the national road and the interchange for the highway also improved the road service, enhancing the urban development of the whole area.

This late development can be seen in the population studies as well. The population is currently the most important of Urasoe and it was also a densely populated area in the Meiji, Taishō and pre-war Shōwa periods. However, after the war and before the reversion, the surrounding areas developed very quickly while Nishibaru stagnated in its rural state.

The population started to increase again with the creation of the residential areas. The first one was the Kōei Residential Area (Japanese: 広栄団地), built in the 1970's at the instigation of the inhabitants themselves, who advanced the funds to create a development company. In the 1980's, lobbying from the inhabitants also conducted to the construction of the Uranishi Residential Area (Japanese: 浦西団地). This residential area later extended as far as Yōgei Bridge (Japanese: 陽迎橋). The population of the original settlement of Nishibaru also increased and the whole population is currently close to 11000 persons. Half of the population lives in the original settlement, while the other half lives in the post-war developed areas of Kōei Danchi, Uranishi Danchi and Yogei Bridge.

Despite those leading absolute numbers, the population growth rate is a little lower than the average rate in Urasoe city.

=== Historical Sites ===
==== Nishihara 1st Block ====
- Iri-nu-mō

==== Nishihara 2nd Block ====
- Fūtoyā

==== Nishihara 3rd Block ====
- Kushi-nu-kā

==== Nishihara 4th Block ====
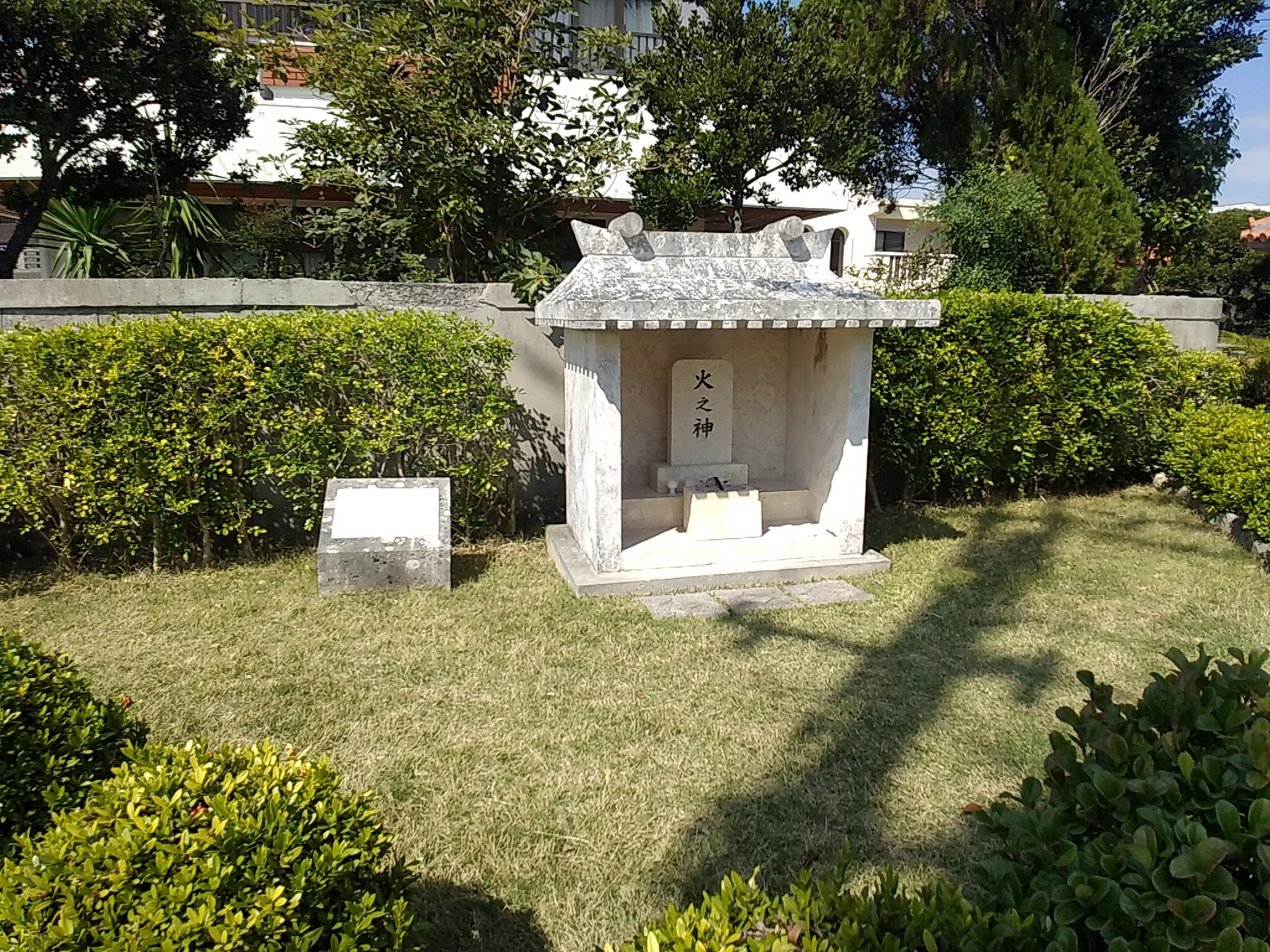
Nishibaru Mura Hi-nu-kan

- Agari-mō
- Mura Hi-nu-kan
- Ugan'yama Park
  - Shimatui-mō
  - Ibi (Furutanabaru-nu-taki)
  - Furutanabaru-nu-tun
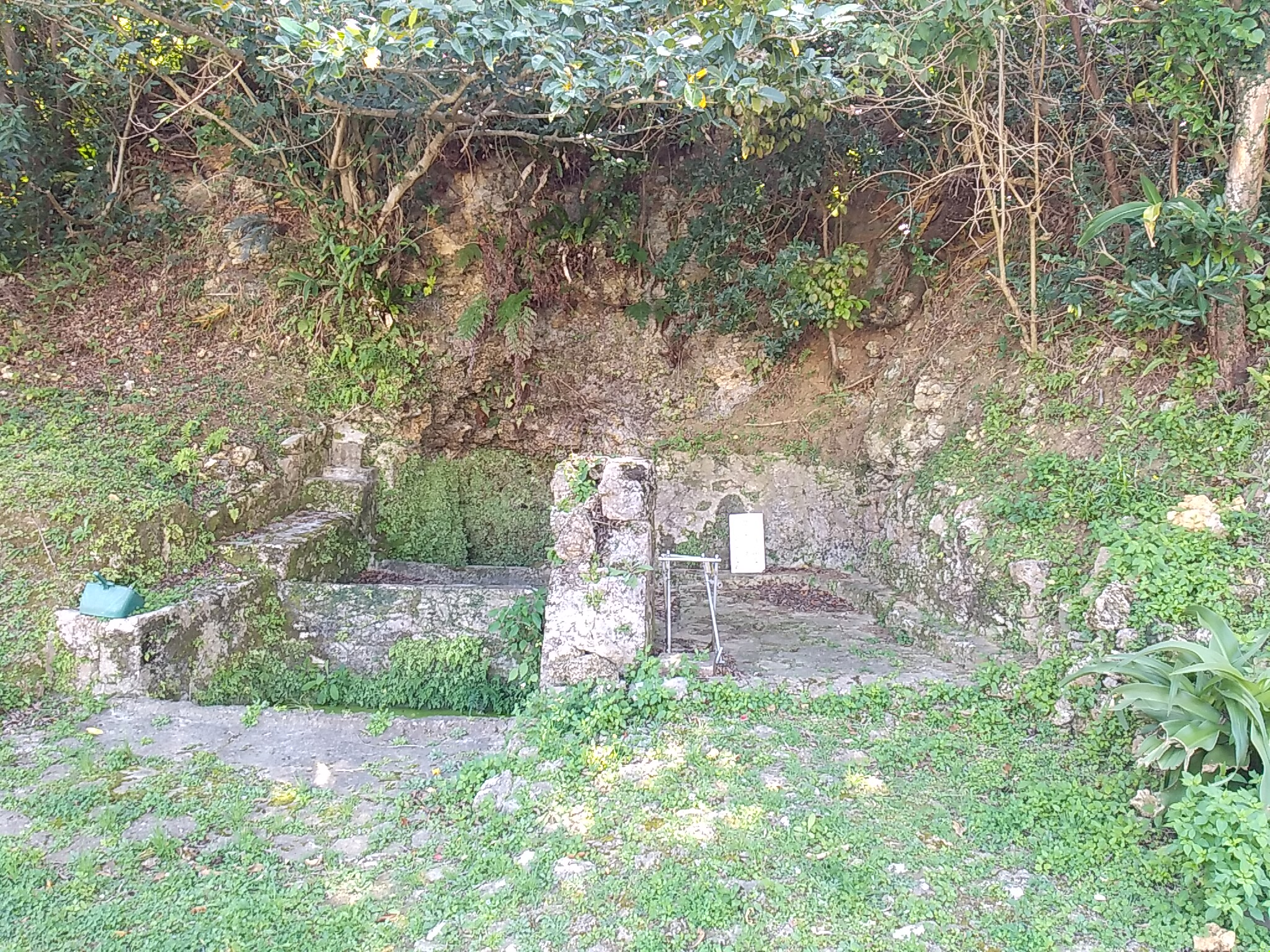
- Agari-gā
  Agari-gā
- Sentaku-gā
- Ugan'yama Archaeological Site

== Transportation ==
- Okinawa Expressway
  - Nishihara Interchange

The entrance, exit and toll booth are all in Nishihara in Urasoe City, but the roads leading to and coming from the main expressway are located in Nishihara Town.

- Japan National Route 330
- Okinawa Prefectural Route 241 Ginowan-Haebaru

== Communities ==
- Nishibaru 1st District Community
- Nishibaru 2nd District Community
- Kōei Community
- Uranishi Community
- Yōgei Bridge Community

== Infrastructures ==
=== Nishihara 1st Block ===
- Nishibaru Community Centre
- JA Okinawa Urasoe City Nishihara Branch
- Co-op Okinawa Distribution Centre
- Iri-nu-mō

=== Nishihara 2nd Block ===
- Urasoe Nishihara Post Office
- P's Square
- Town Plaza Kanehide Kōei Shop

=== Nishihara 3rd Block ===
- Kōei Community Centre

=== Nishihara 4th Block ===
- West Nippon Expressway Company Limited Kyūshū Branch Okinawa Office
  - Nishihara Toll Booth
- Nishibaru Children Centre
- Tsunahiki Park
- Agari-mō
- Ugan'yama Park

=== Nishihara 5th Block ===
- Uranishi Residential Area
- Yōgei Bridge Community Centre
- Nishibaru Park
- Shirayuri Park
- Sakura Park
- Deigo Park
- Ajisai Park
- San-e V21 Uranishi Food Market
- Public Golf Urasoe

=== Nishihara 6th Block ===
- Uranishi Community Centre
- Himawari Park
- Cattleya Park
- Tsunahiki Bridge
