= Denseisha =

Denseisha (電盛社) is a Japanese information technology Kabushiki gaisha founded by Takashi Mizawa (三澤 隆) in October 1920. Currently, the corporation headquartered in Kumamoto employs 271 workers at the seven main offices

- the headquarters, IT and ET administration in Kumamoto,
- the system engineering technology center in Kumamoto,
- a branch office in Fukuoka,
- the "solution center" in Fukuoka,
- the "mobile engineering office" in Fukuoka and
- a sales office in Urasoe.

The service field comprises the development and installation of enterprise and hospital network as well as the design of electric, IT and personnel communication facilities.
