= Junior and Senior High School Affiliated to Showa Pharmaceutical University =

The Junior and Senior High School Affiliated to Showa Pharmaceutical University

Location
- 450 Takushi; Urasoe, Okinawa; 901-2112; Japan; 26°14′17.74″N 127°42′47.12″E

Information
- Type: Private school, coeducational, day school, secondary school
- Motto: Japanese: 専一集注; Japanese: 堅忍不抜 (Single-minded concentration Unswerving fortitude)
- Established: 23 January 1974; 52 years ago (High school); 20 January 1986 (Junior high school)
- Founder: Showa Pharmaceutical University Educational Corporation; Kotaro Ogiwara (Chairman)
- Principal: Kazumasa Tomisato
- Faculty: 115
- Gender: Coeducational
- Enrollment: 1,242 (2022)
- Color: Cobalt blue
- Annual tuition: ¥408,000–¥468,000
- Affiliation: Showa Pharmaceutical University
- Website: www.showayakka-jh.ed.jp

The Junior and Senior High School Affiliated to Showa Pharmaceutical University (Japanese: 昭和薬科大学附属高等学校・中学校, Hepburn: Shōwa Yakka Daigaku Fuzoku Kōtōgakkō・Chūgakkō), often abbreviated as Shōwa Yakka Daifu (昭和薬科大附), is a private, coeducational junior and senior high school located in Urasoe, Okinawa Prefecture, which follows a six-year secondary education curriculum.

== History ==
The school was established in 1974 by Showa Pharmaceutical University, located in Machida, Tokyo. Kotaro Ogiwara, the seventh chairman of the institution's board of trustees, founded the school to contribute to the reconstruction of Okinawa following the Pacific War.

The affiliated junior high school was established on campus in 1986. In 2003, the institution adopted a fully integrated six-year junior and senior high school educational system.

=== Past Headmasters ===
No.	Name	Term of office
1	Chōjun Miyajima (宮島長純)	1974–1977
2	Masateru Yamashiro (山城昌輝)	1978–1985
3	Takeshi Miyazato (宮里毅)	1986–1993
4	Sadatoshi Higa (比嘉定俊)	1994–2000
5	Hajime Amuro (安室肇)	2001–2007
6	Tatsuya Inafuku (稲福達也)	2008–2015
7	Akira Moromizato (諸見里明)	2016–2022
8	Kazumasa Tomisato (冨里一公)	2023–present
