= John Unten =

Japanese baseball player

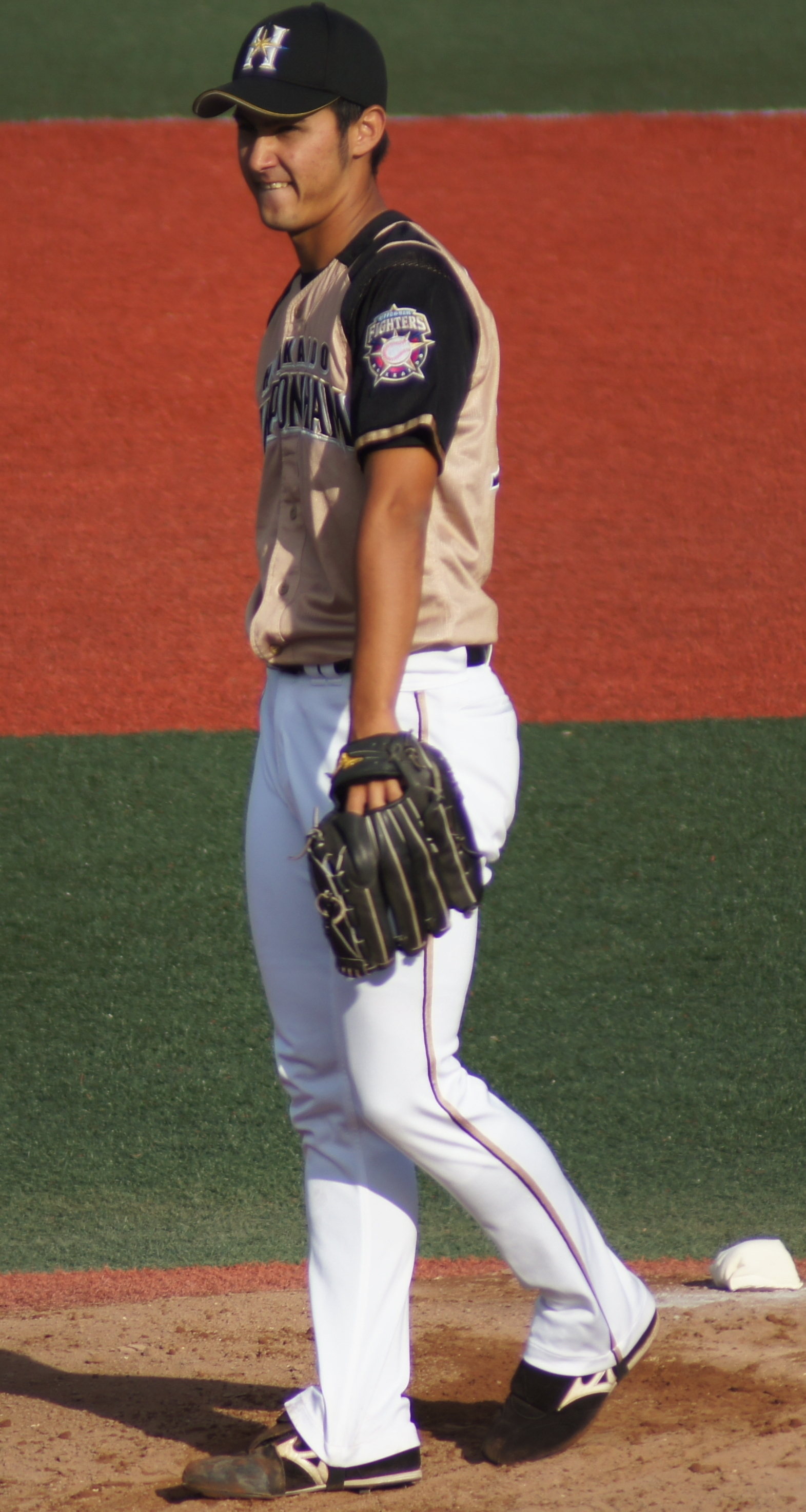
- Pitcher
- Born: March 27, 1992 (age 34); Ginowan, Okinawa, Japan
- Bats: Right Throws: Right

NPB debut
- 2011, for the Hokkaido Nippon-Ham Fighters

NPB statistics (through 2011)
- Games: 1
- Innings pitched: 1.0
- Earned run average: 9.00
- Stats at Baseball Reference

Teams
- Hokkaido Nippon-Ham Fighters (2011)

John Clayton Unten (運天ジョン・クレイトン, born March 27, 1992, in Ginowan, Okinawa) is a Japanese professional baseball pitcher for the Hokkaido Nippon-Ham Fighters in Japan's Nippon Professional Baseball. He played in one game in 2011.
