= Urasoe, Okinawa =

City in Okinawa Prefecture, Japan

Urasoe 浦添市 Urasoeshi
- City
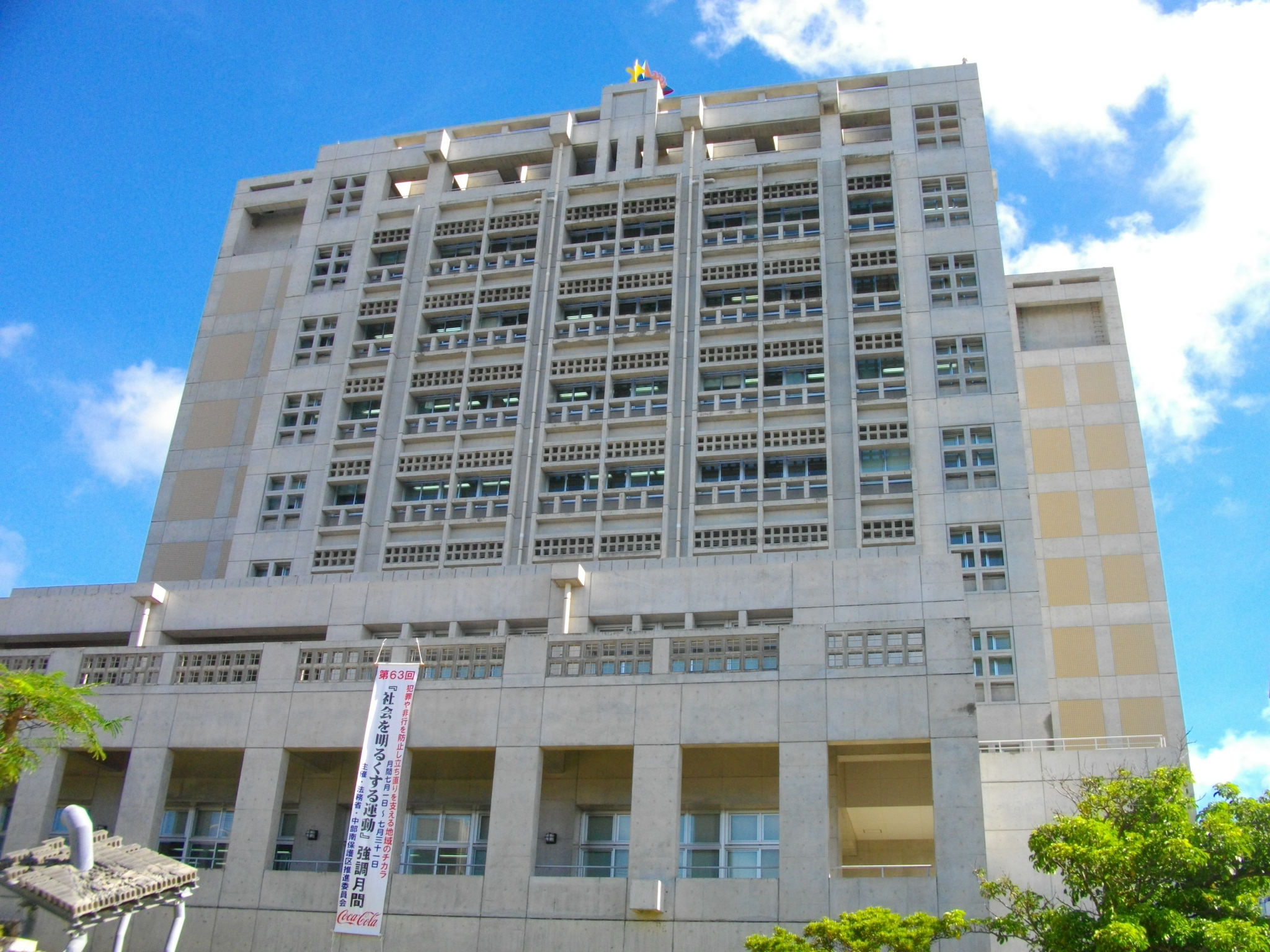
- Urasoe City Hall

- Flag Seal

- Location of Urasoe in Okinawa Prefecture

- Location within Japan
- Coordinates: 26°14′45″N 127°43′19″E
- Country: Japan
- Region: Kyushu (Ryukyu)
- Prefecture: Okinawa Prefecture

Government
  - Mayor: Tetsuji Matsumoto

Area
  - Total: 19.09 km^{2} (7.37 sq mi)

Population (February, 2024)
  - Total: 115,518
  - Density: 6,051.2/km^{2} (15,673/sq mi)
- Time zone: UTC+9 (Japan Standard Time)
  - Tree: Horutonoki (Elaeocarpus sylvestris var. ellipticus)
  - Flower: Henderson Allamanda
  - Flowering tree: Poinciana
- Phone number: 098-876-1234
- Address: 1-1-1, Ahacha, Urasoe-shi 901-2501
- Website: www.city.urasoe.lg.jp

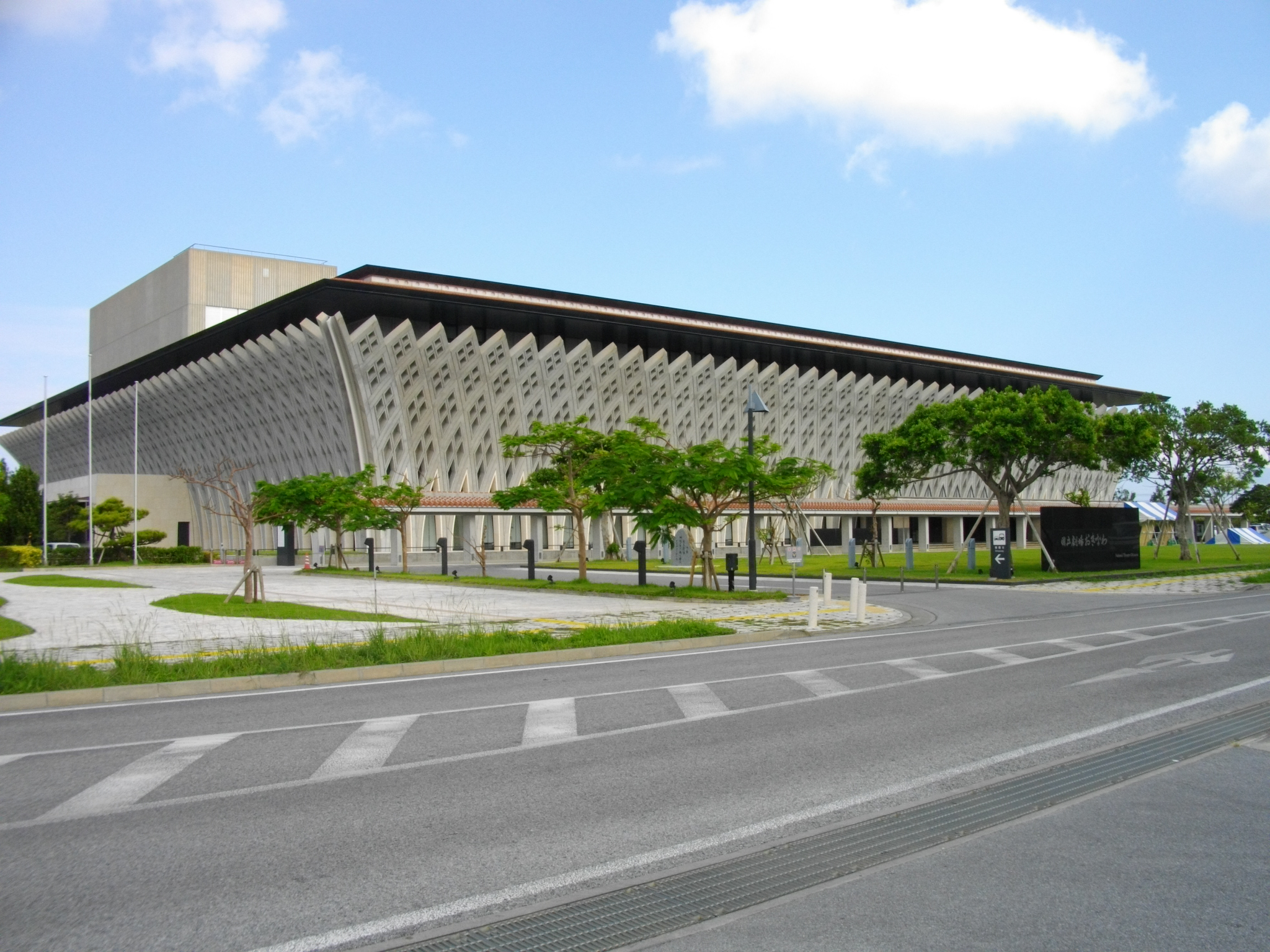
National Theatre Okinawa

Urasoe (浦添市, Urasoe-shi) Japanese pronunciation: [ɯ̈̀.ɾä́.só̞.é̞(.ɕì)]; Okinawan: Urashii is a city located in Okinawa Prefecture, Japan. The neighboring municipalities are Naha to the south, Ginowan to the north, and Nishihara to the east. As of February 2024, the city has an estimated population of 115,518 and a population density of 6,051.2 persons per km^{2}. The total area is 19.09 km^{2}.

United States Marine Corps base Camp Kinser is located on the city's coast.

== Etymology ==
The name "Urasoe" is made up of two kanji characters. The first, 浦, means "a coastal area", and the second, 添, means "ruling" or "uniting". The name is a reference to "ruling over many areas".

However, what appears to be an older form of this word is attested in Old Okinawan under the forms *uraosoi うらおそい and *uraosoe うらおそへ.

== Geography ==
Urasoe sits to the south of Okinawa Island. Urasoe is rugged and hilly to the east, and the city slopes gently to the East China Sea in the west. Urasoe, while formerly agricultural, has become heavily urbanized due to its proximity to the prefectural capital of Naha.

=== Administrative divisions ===
The city includes twenty wards.

- Ahacha (安波茶)
- Gusukuma (城間)
- Inanse (伊奈武瀬)
- Irijima (西洲)
- Iso (伊祖)
- Jicchaku (勢理客)
- Kowan (小湾)
- Kyōzuka (経塚)
- Maeda (前田)
- Makiminato (牧港)
- Minatogawa (港川)
- Miyagi (宮城)
- Nakama (仲間)
- Nakanishi (仲西)
- Nishihara (西原)
- Ōhira (大平)
- Takushi (沢岻)
- Tōyama (当山)
- Uchima (内間)
- Yafuso (屋富祖)

=== Neighboring municipalities ===
- Ginowan
- Naha
- Nishihara

== Transportation ==
The city is served by Naha Airport and the Okinawa Expressway. Also it has three stations of Okinawa Urban Monorail (Yui Rail): Kyozuka, Urasoe-Maeda and Tedako-Uranishi.

== History ==
Urasoe was the original capital of the Okinawan kingdom of Chūzan for several centuries until it was supplanted by Shuri in the late 14th or early 15th century. Shunten (1166–1237), the first known king of the Chuzan Kingdom, located in the central region of the island of Okinawa, ruled from Urasoe, as did his son and grandson. For much of the 14th century, Urasoe Castle was the largest on the island of Okinawa. The castle now contains the remains of several kings of the Ryukyu Kingdom.

Urasoe was completely razed during the Battle of Okinawa in 1945 at the end of World War II. 45% of the population, 4,117 residents, died during the battle. The village office of Urasoe was re-established in 1946 to conduct basic administrative functions, settle refugees returning to the village, and restore agricultural land. The village saw a significant increase in U.S. military presence in 1950 in the western coast of the village, which eventually became Camp Kinser. The population of Urasoe grew rapidly from 1956, and the city became a bedroom community of Naha in this period. Urasoe was elevated to city status on July 1, 1970.

== Economy ==
The beer company Orion Breweries has its headquarters in Urasoe.

== Diplomatic missions ==
The U.S. Consulate General for Naha is in Urasoe.

== Education ==
Urasoe city operates public elementary schools and junior high schools, while the Okinawa Prefectural Board of Education operates public high schools.

Prefectural high schools:

- Naha Technical High School
- Urasoe High School
- Urasoe Commercial High School
- Urasoe Technical High School
- Youmei High School

Municipal junior high schools include:

- Kamimori Junior High School (神森中学校)
- Minatogawa Junior High School (港川中学校)
- Nakanishi Junior High School (仲西中学校)
- Uranishi Junior High School (浦西中学校)
- Urasoe Junior High School (浦添中学校)

Municipal elementary schools include:

- Kamimori Elementary School (神森小学校)
- Maeda Elementary School (前田小学校)
- Makiminato Elementary School (牧港小学校)
- Miyagi Elementary School (宮城小学校)
- Nakanishi Elementary School (仲西小学校)
- Takushi Elementary School (沢岻小学校)
- Toyama Elementary School (当山小学校)
- Uchima Elementary School (内間小学校)
- Urashiro Elementary School (浦城小学校)
- Urasoe Elementary School (浦添小学校)

Private schools:

- Junior and Senior High School Affiliated to Showa Pharmaceutical University

The Department of Defense Education Activity (DoDEA) of the United States federal government operates Kinser Elementary School at Camp Kinser.

== Notable residents ==
Urasoe is the hometown of Japanese actress, musician and former idol Yukie Nakama.

== Cultural and natural assets ==
Urasoe City hosts seventy-two designated or registered tangible cultural properties and monuments, at the national, prefectural or municipal level, including forty-four items of Ryūkyū lacquerware.

- Name (Japanese) (Type of registration)

=== Cultural Properties ===
- Black lacquer agarwood box with hishi leaves and shippōtsunagi pattern, raden technique (黒漆菱七宝繋螺鈿伽羅箱) (Municipal)
- Black lacquer box with aoimon patterns and chrysanthemums, raden technique (黒漆葵紋菊螺鈿箱) (Prefectural)
- Black lacquer box with figures on horseback, raden technique (黒漆騎馬人物螺鈿箱) (Municipal)
- Black lacquer box with grapes and squirrels, raden technique with gold leaf (黒漆葡萄栗鼠螺鈿箔絵箱) (Municipal)
- Black lacquer box with kisshōmon patterns, raden technique with gold leaf (黒漆吉祥文螺鈿箔絵箱) (Municipal)
- Black lacquer central table with landscape with pavilions, raden technique (黒漆山水楼閣螺鈿中央卓) (Municipal)
- Black lacquer cupboard with shelves with pavilions and human figures, raden technique (黒漆楼閣人物螺鈿飾棚) (Municipal)
- Black lacquer flower-shaped tray with landscape with human figures, raden technique (黒漆山水人物螺鈿輪花盆) (Municipal)
- Black lacquer food container with peacocks, peonies and karakusa scrolls, chinkin technique (黒漆孔雀牡丹唐草沈金食籠)
- Black lacquer large tray with clouds and dragons, raden technique (黒漆雲龍螺鈿大盆) (Prefectural)
- Black lacquer long writing box with clouds, dragons and phoenixes, raden technique (黒漆雲龍鳳凰螺鈿長文箱) (Municipal)
- Black lacquer octagonal food container with algae, fishes and plovers, raden technique (黒漆藻魚千鳥螺鈿八角食籠) (Municipal)
- Black lacquer octagonal food container with grapes and squirrels, gold leaf (黒漆葡萄栗鼠箔絵八角食籠) (Municipal)
- Black lacquer octagonal food container with landscape with human figures, raden technique (黒漆山水人物螺鈿八角食籠) (Municipal)
- Black lacquer octagonal food container with pavilions and human figures, raden technique (黒漆楼閣人物螺鈿八角食籠) (Municipal)
- Black lacquer octagonal food container with the "twenty-four paragons of filial piety" and karakusa scrolls, raden and chinkin techniques (黒漆二十四孝唐草螺鈿沈金八角食籠) (Municipal)
- Black lacquer plaque with Sima Guang Family Precepts, raden technique (黒漆司馬温公家訓螺鈿掛板) (Municipal)
- Black lacquer pumpkin-shaped tobacco container with landscape with human figures, raden technique (黒漆山水人物螺鈿阿古陀形煙草入) (Municipal)
- Black lacquer screen with landscape with human figures, raden technique (黒漆山水人物螺鈿衝立) (Municipal)
- Black lacquer table with peonies and karakusa scrolls, raden technique (黒漆牡丹唐草螺鈿卓) (Prefectural)
- Black lacquer three-level incense container with kirin mythical animal, grapes and squirrels, raden technique (黒漆麒麟葡萄栗鼠螺鈿重香合) (Municipal)
- Black lacquer tray with clouds and dragon, raden technique (黒漆雲龍螺鈿盆) (Municipal)
- Black lacquer tray with flowers and birds, raden technique with gold leaf and mitsudae painting (黒漆花鳥螺鈿箔絵密陀絵盆) (Municipal)
- Black lacquer tundābun serving tray with paulownias and phoenixes, raden technique (黒漆桐鳳凰螺鈿東道盆) (Municipal)
- Black lacquer writing paper box with grapes and squirrels, raden technique with gold leaf (黒漆葡萄栗鼠螺鈿箔絵料紙箱) (Municipal)
- Byakudannuri lacquer tākū hot water pail with landscape with pavilions, gold leaf technique (白檀塗楼閣山水箔絵湯庫) (Municipal)
- "Eight Views of Ryūkyū", ukiyo-e prints by Hokusai (琉球八景) (Municipal)
- "Flowers and birds", painting (花鳥図) (Municipal)
- Genealogic records of the Shō Clan (向姓家譜) (Municipal)
- Green lacquer round chest with phoenixes, clouds and checkered lattice, chinkin technique (緑漆鳳凰雲点斜格子沈金丸櫃) (Municipal)
- Green lacquer serving tray with peonies, karakusa scrolls and stone pavement, chinkin technique (緑漆牡丹唐草石畳沈金膳) (Municipal)
- Iso-no-takaufaka Tomb (伊祖の高御墓) (Prefectural)
- Proof prints for "Eight Views of Ryūkyū" (琉球八景校合摺り) (Municipal)
- Red and black lacquer table with clouds and dragon, raden and chinkin techniques (朱黒漆雲龍沈金螺鈿卓) (Municipal)
- Red lacquer desk with birds and flowers, raden technique with gold leaf and mitsudae painting (朱漆花鳥螺鈿箔絵密陀絵机) (Prefectural)
- Red lacquer hexagonal tray with plum and moon, raden technique (朱漆梅月螺鈿六角盆) (Municipal)
- Red lacquer ryōka flower-shaped food container with pavilions and human figures, gold leaf technique (朱漆楼閣人物箔絵稜花形食籠) (Municipal)
- Red lacquer screen with bamboo, tiger and connected pearls, chinkin and raden technique (朱漆竹虎連珠沈金螺鈿座屏) (Municipal)
- Red lacquer serving tray with flowers and birds, chinkin technique (朱漆花鳥沈金膳) (Municipal)
- Red lacquer square tray with Kanzan and Jittoku story depiction, raden technique (朱漆寒山拾得螺鈿四方盆) (Municipal)
- Red lacquer table with peonies and a long-tailed bird, raden technique (朱漆牡丹尾長鳥螺鈿卓) (Prefectural)
- Red lacquer tray on pedestal with landscape with human figures, chinkin technique (朱漆山水人物沈金足付盆) (Municipal)
- Red lacquer tray on pedestal with peonies, tomoe and shippōtsunagi patterns, chinkin technique (朱漆牡丹巴紋七宝繋沈金足付盆) (Municipal)
- Red lacquer tray with flowers and birds, mitsudae painting (朱漆花鳥密陀絵盆) (Municipal)
- Red lacquer tundābun serving tray with landscape and human figures, gold leaf technique (朱漆山水人物箔絵東道盆) (Municipal)
- "Ryūkyū Trading Port", painting (琉球交易港図) (Municipal)
- "Ryūkyū Trading Port", painting on byōbu screen (琉球交易港図屏風) (Municipal)
- Stone zushi (funerary urn) of Urasoe Yōdore mausoleum (浦添ようどれ石厨子) (Prefectural)
- Uruminuri lacquer inkstone box with grapes and squirrels, raden technique with gold leaf (潤塗葡萄栗鼠螺鈿箔絵硯箱) (Municipal)
- Uruminuri lacquer round food container with flowers and birds, gold leaf and mitsudae painting (潤塗花鳥箔絵密陀絵丸形食籠) (Municipal)
- Uruminuri lacquer ryōka flower-shaped food container with boats and vegetation, gold leaf technique (潤塗舟遊草花箔絵稜花形食籠) (Municipal)
- White square tray with landscape with pavilions and human figures, mitsudae painting and gold leaf (白密陀山水楼閣人物密陀絵箔絵四方盆) (Municipal)

=== Historic Sites ===
- Ahacha Fījā spring (安波茶樋川) (Municipal)
- Chijifuchā Cave Site (チヂフチャー洞穴遺跡) (Municipal)
- Iso Castle Site (伊祖城跡) (Prefectural)
- Kyozuka Stele (経塚の碑) (Municipal)
- Machinato Terabugama Cave (牧港テラブのガマ) (Municipal)
- Nakagami West Coast Road and Futenma Shrine approach (中頭方西海道及び普天間参詣道) (National)
- Nakama Praying Sites: Jitū Hi-nu-kan Fire God Altar (仲間の拝所群 地頭火ヌ神) (Municipal)
- Nakama Praying Sites: Kubasā-nu-utaki Sacred Site (仲間の拝所群 クバサーヌ御嶽) (Municipal)
- Nakama Praying Sites: Nakama Fījā spring (仲間の拝所群 仲間樋川) (Municipal)
- Nakama Praying Sites: Nakamantira Praying Site (仲間の拝所群 仲間ンティラ) (Municipal)
- Nishibaru Agari-gā spring (西原東ガー) (Municipal)
- Nishibaru Sentaku-gā spring (西原洗濯ガー) (Municipal)
- Takushi Iri-nu-kā spring (沢岻イリヌカー) (Municipal)
- Urasoe Castle Site (浦添城跡) (National)
- Urasoe Shell Mound (浦添貝塚) (Prefectural)
- Urasoe Udun Tomb (浦添御殿の墓) (Municipal)
- Tamagusuku Chōkun's Tomb (Hentona Tomb) (玉城朝薫の墓 (邊土名の墓)) (Municipal)

=== Places of scenic beauty ===
- Amamiku-nu-mui (Iso Gusuku) (アマミクヌムイ (伊祖グスク)) (National)

=== Natural Monuments ===
- Banyan tree of Yafuso Uganju Praying Site (屋富祖の御願所のガジュマル) (Municipal)
- Large bishop wood tree of Uchima (内間の大アカギ) (Municipal)
