= Oroku-baka Tomb =

Historical tomb in Okinawa, Japan

- 小禄墓 (Okinawan)
- Uruku-baka
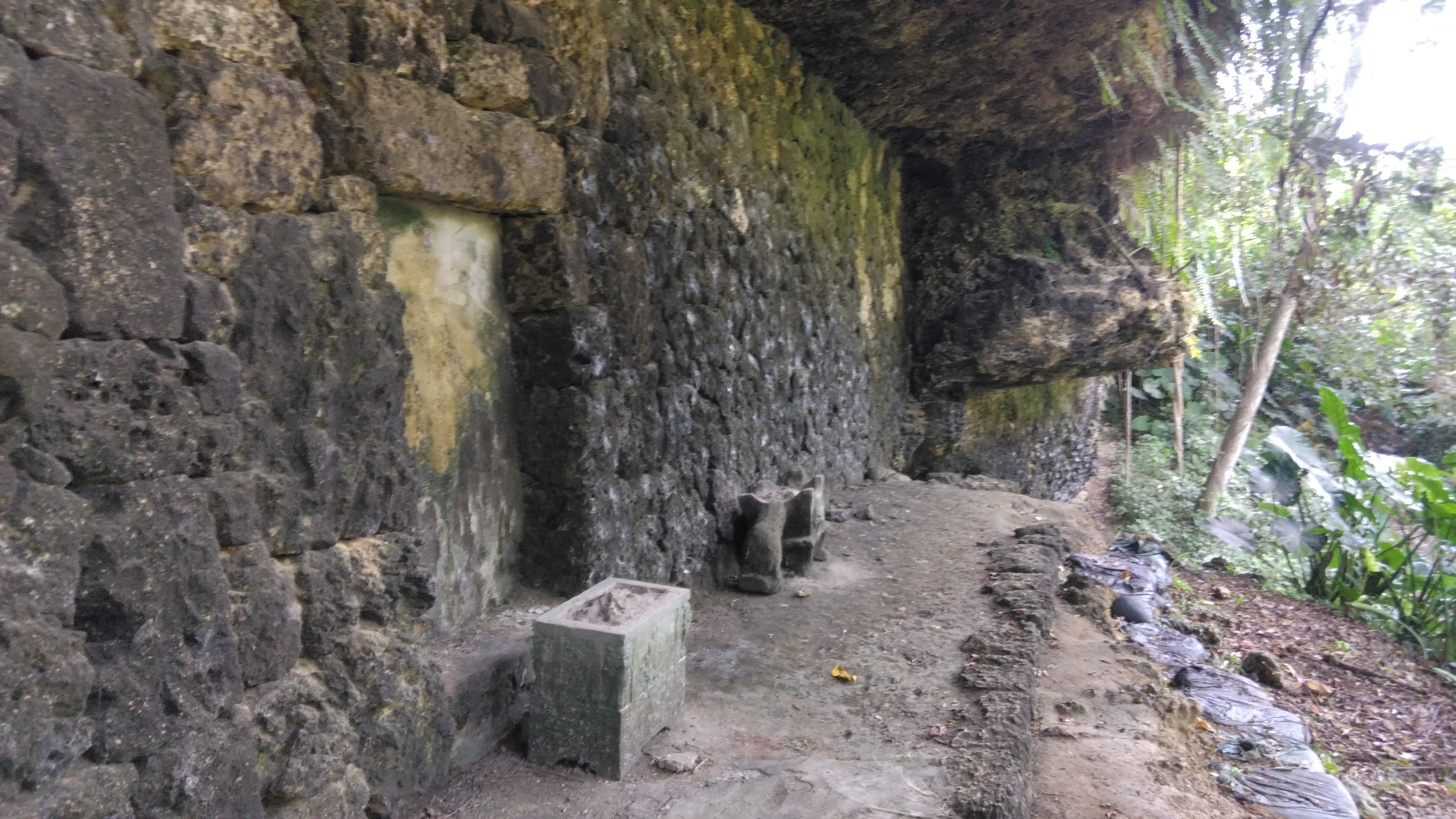
- Oroku-baka Tomb
- Interactive map of Oroku-baka Tomb
- 26°15′36.1″N 127°44′16.5″E
- Type: Tomb
- Periods: Ryūkyū Kingdom
- Associated with: Oroku Ufuyakumui
- Location: Kakazu, Ginowan, Okinawa, Japan
- Part of: Hiyāra-gā River Valley Old Tomb Cluster

History
- Built: 14th – 15th c. AD
- Built by: Hyō Clan (憑氏)

Site notes
- Material: Limestone
- Height: 2.4 m (7 ft 10 in)
- Length: 8.5 m (28 ft)
- Architectural style: Cliff tomb
- Excavation dates: Opened for survey in 1956
- Condition: Good
- Owner: Private, Hyō Clan (憑氏)
- Public access: Permissive

Designations
- Designation: Prefectural Cultural Property

The Oroku-baka tomb (小禄墓, Okinawan:Uruku-baka) is a tomb of the 14th–15th centuries located in aza Kakazu in Ginowan, Okinawa, Japan. It includes among others the remains of Oroku Ufuyakumui (Okinawan: Uruku Ufuyakumui), a lord of the Ryūkyū Kingdom during the reign of King Shō Shin at the end of the 15th century.

The tomb, its associated stone funerary urn, one of its stone incense burners and its stone lions have been designated as Tangible Cultural Properties at the prefectural or municipal level.

== Location ==
The Oroku-baka tomb belongs to a larger archaeological site registered under the name of "Hiyāra-gā River Valley Old Tomb Cluster" (比屋良川流域古墓群). There are more than two hundred old tombs in this cluster, dug into the cliffs along the Hiyara-gawa river (Note: Traditional name: Hiyāra-gā. It is also called Uchidumai-gawa.) in Kakazu (in Ginowan City). At several locations, the tombs are dug on three stages in the cliff, most of them are several centuries old.

== Description ==
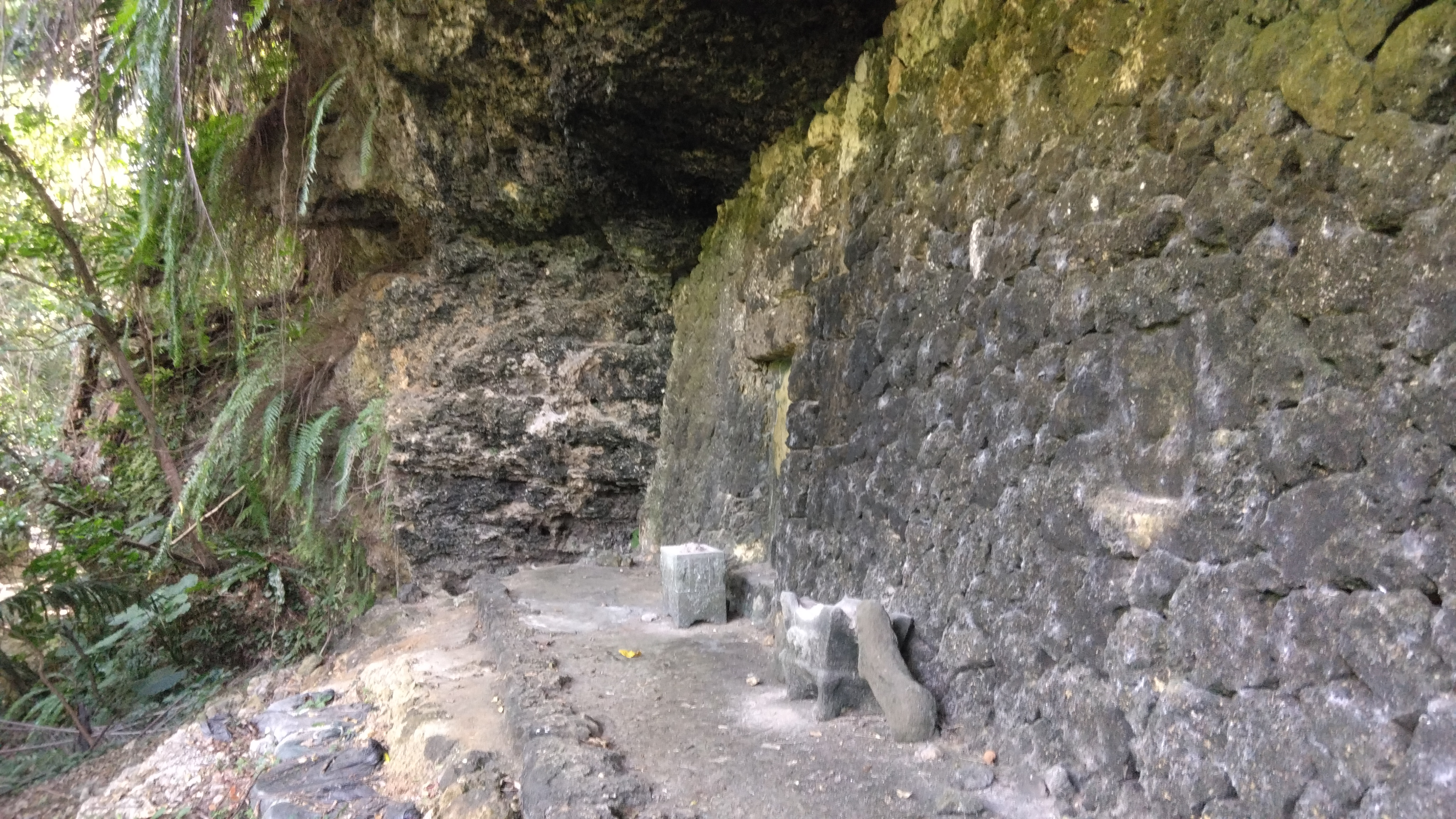
View of the tomb stone wall, with the incense burners

Built between the 14th and the 15th century, the Oroku-baka tomb is a cliff tomb using a cavity dug by the middle of a Ryūkyū limestone cliff about 10 meters high, along the Hiyara-gawa river.

The cave dug into the cliff has been closed by a stone wall essentially in opus incertum, 8.5 metres long and 2.4 metres high. Cut stones have been used only for the frame of the door and of the temporary opening: Although the tomb has a door, during funerals, all the central part of the wall was dismantled in order to insert the funerary palanquin inside the tomb. In order to ease this operation and prevent the complete collapse of the wall when opening the tomb, chains of cut stones were set on each side of the door, defining a removable wall section 1.7 metre wide. The fact of putting the palanquin directly inside the tomb for the decomposition of the corpse and of dismantling a part of the tomb wall for this purpose is characteristic of royal tombs. A similar practice is very probable for instance at the Urasoe yōdore.

The upper part of the wall includes a window from which one can see the interior of the tomb. The main funerary urn of the tomb is set such that it is directly observable from this window. The other funerary urns do not seem to present any particular setting pattern: the inside of the tomb does not show any partition or grade (stairs), which is characteristic of the early period of the Ryūkyū Kingdom.

The Oroku-baka tomb was designated as tangible cultural property, "buildings" category, at the prefectural level (県指定有形文化財[建造物]) in January 1958. The tomb is managed by the Uegushikawa family who lives in aza Ōyama in Ginowan.

== Stone funerary urn ==
The stone funerary urn of the Oroku-baka tomb, dated 1494, was studied during an opening of the tomb in 1956. It is set in the tomb as to be visible from the window opened in the wall. The many other funerary urns of the tomb have not yet been the subject of detailed studies.

It is a "residence-shaped" (御殿形, udun-gata) urn, with its lid figuring a tile-covered roof. It is in dolerite, (Note: Initially identified as diorite) 88 centimetres long, 48 centimetres wide and 87 centimetres high with the lid. The base is 88 centimetres long, and 15 centimetres high, the main urn body 67.5 centimetres long, 48 centimetres wide and 48 centimetres high. The lid is 24 centimetres high. The stone was imported from the Fujian area of China. There are only three other tombs with funerary urns in stone that have been imported from China for this period in Okinawa: the Urasoe yōdore, Shuri Tama-udun and Izena Tama-udun, all of them royal mausolea.

The urn is entirely engraved with low reliefs figuring the columns and lintels of a building, and shows two figures holding flowers on the front face, on both sides of a door-shaped cartouche. The lid is shaped as a roof, covered in tiles with carved dragons on the ridge. The style of the low reliefs is very similar to the one observable on the funerary urn of the Urasoe yōdore. Those detailed carvings are older than the ones on the bridge of the Enkaku-ji Temple (Year 11 of the Hongzhi Era, 1498) or than the ones of Shuri Tama-udun (Year 14, 1501), which makes them an important document for the studies concerning sculpture in Ryūkyū and its evolution at the end of King Shō Shin's reign.

The dedicatory inscription, in the cartouche, includes traditional Chinese characters and Japanese hiragana characters: "Hongzhi 7, Uruku Ufuyakumui, sixth month, auspicious day" (弘治七年 おろく大やくもい 六月吉日). The year 7 of the Hongzhi era corresponds to 1494 (eighteenth year of King Shō Shin's reign). It is the oldest known inscription including Japanese characters in the Ryūkyū Kingdom. Uruku (Note: Current pronunciation: Oroku) is a place name: there is an ancient village with this name currently inside the city of Naha. Ufuyakumui is the name of a function of a high-level land administrator in the Shuri royal government. (Note: Later, the pronunciation will evolve toward "pēchin") Thus, we know that the urn (or rather its material) was imported from China for a lord of the end of the 15th century, during the reign of King Shō Shin, who ruled over the area of a village named Oroku (Uruku) and who had risen up to the highest ranks of the Shuri government hierarchy.

Oroku Ufuyakumui, also known under the name of Oroku Uēkata (小禄親方), is the founding ancestor of the Hyō Clan (憑氏), a noble clan member of the Shuri nobility that still exists nowadays. He would be the descendant (fourth generation) of Uegushikawa Hiya (上具志川比屋), himself son of Tengan Aji Taichi (天願按司泰期), second son of Okuma Ufuya (奥間大親) and younger brother of King Satto. The urn has been designated as tangible cultural property, "sculpture" category, at the prefectural level (県指定有形文化財[彫刻]).

== Dolerite incense burner ==
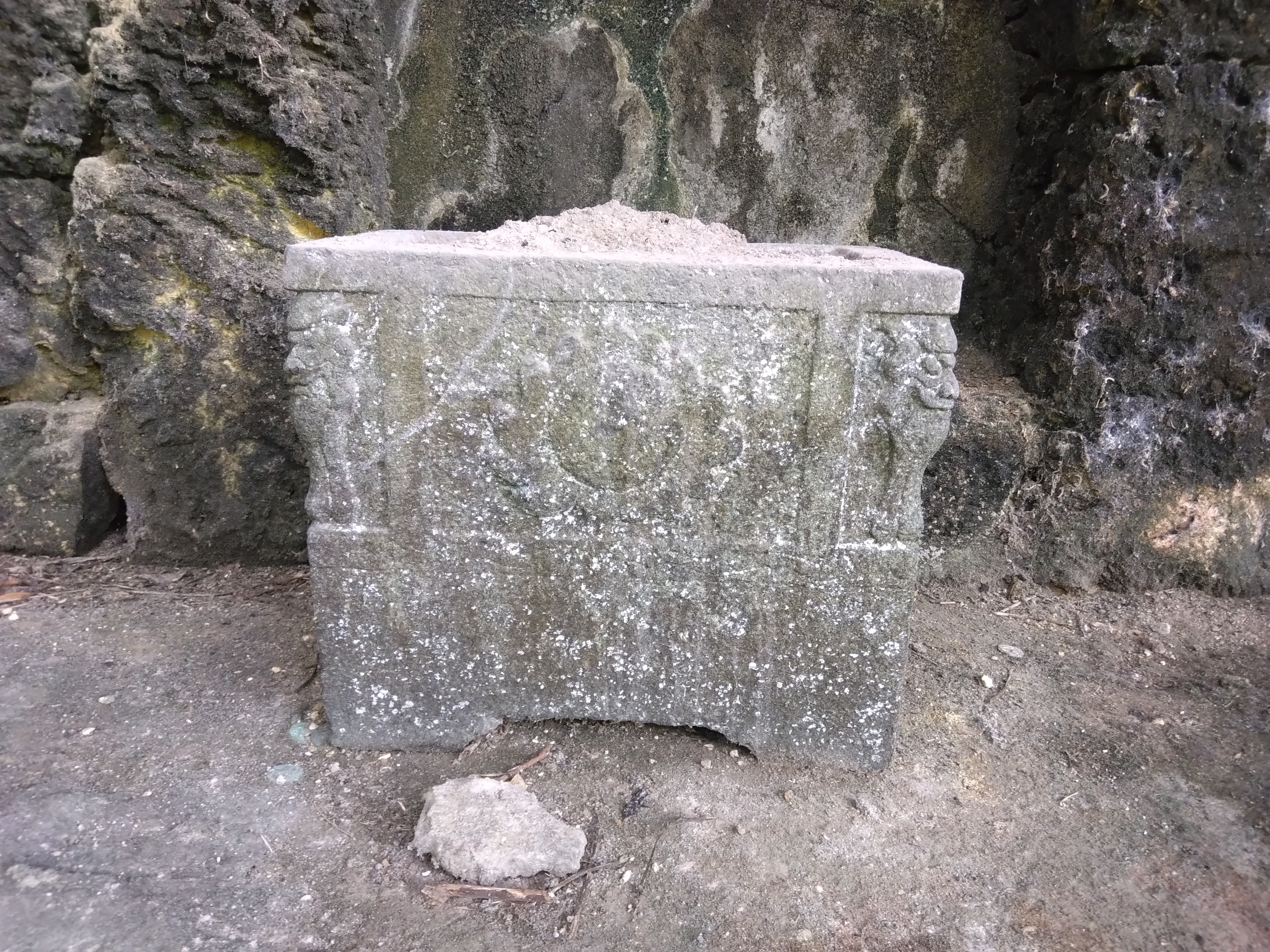
Dolerite incense burner of the Oroku-baka tomb

There are two stone incense burners in front of the Oroku-baka tomb. The first, in dolerite imported from China, is set in front of the door. It is 36 centimetres high, 24 centimetres wide and 42 centimetres long. It is engraved in low relief with patterns reminiscent of columns and lintels as found on residence-shaped funerary urns, and a symbol interpreted as a sun or a kaenhōju (火炎宝珠; lit. "blazing gem") (a pearl surrounded by flames), which is a royal symbol, on the front face, flowers on the side faces and an animal interpreted as a qilin on the back face. There are carved protective lions (獅子, shishi) in relief at the four corners of the incense burner.

On the back face, below the qilin, the incense burner bears a dedicatory inscription: "Jiaqing 11, fire tiger, fifth month, auspicious day. Offering. Hyō Wiki, Hyō Winei" (嘉慶十一丙寅年 五月吉日 奉進 憑維祺 憑維寧). Year 11 of the Jiaqing era corresponds to 1806 (third year of King Shō Kō's reign), it is the date when this incense burner was presented to the tomb by Wiki and Winei, two members of the Hyō Clan.

There are many incense burners in the various sacred places of Ginowan city, but none is comparable in quality to this one. It is, as the funerary urn, an important historical document that brings light on the Ryūkyū Kingdom's international relations, the cultural influences it receives and the sculpture and engraving techniques of the period. It has been designated as tangible cultural property, "sculpture" category, at the municipal level (市指定有形文化財[彫刻]).

== Stone lions ==
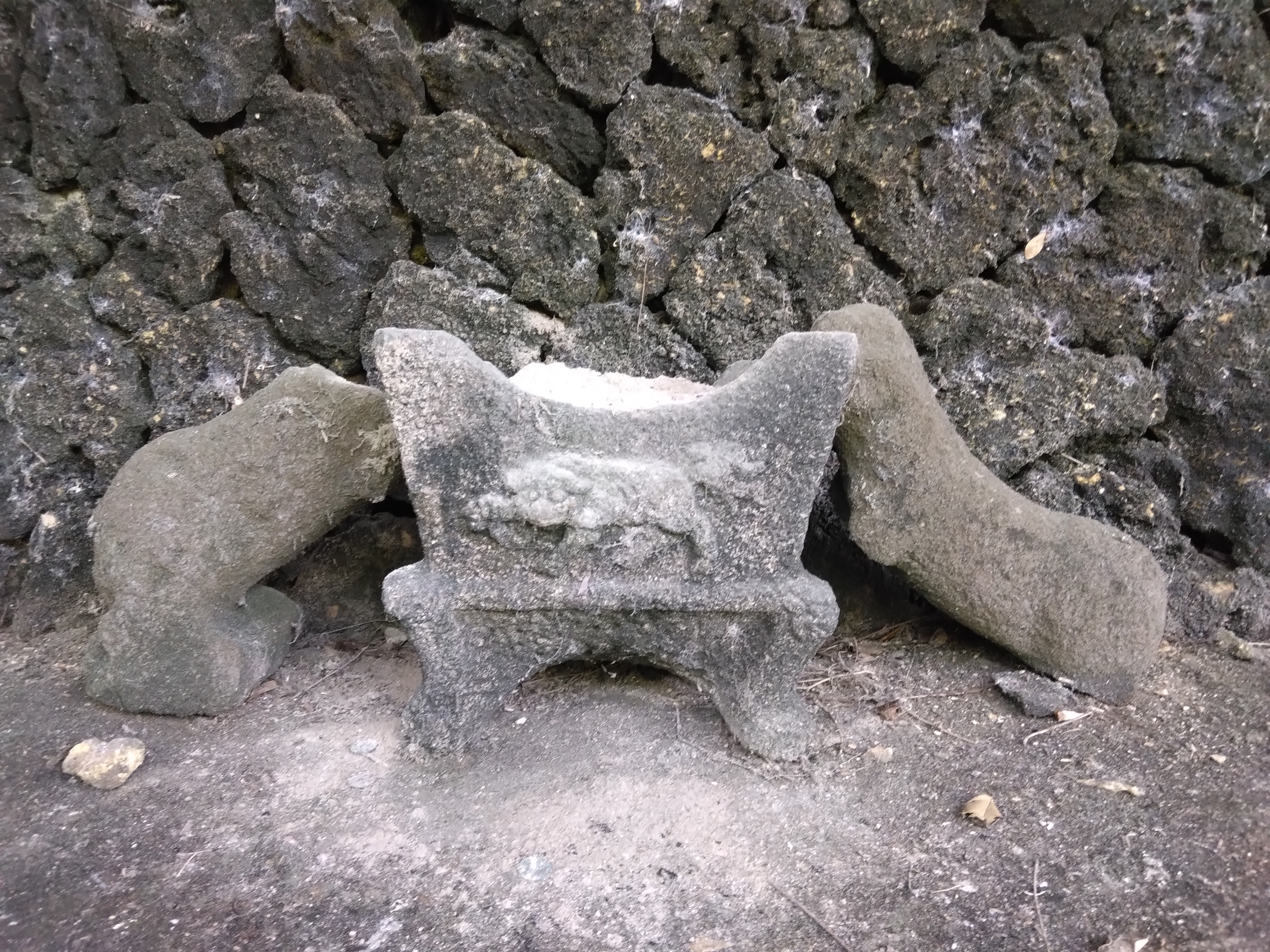
Incense burner and stone lions

The second incense burner, on the right side of the door, is flanked on both sides by a couple of stone lions or shishis. Each lion is 48 centimetres high, 12 centimetres wide and 34 centimetres long. The figures are standing, with the front legs higher than the back ones, as if they were climbing on the incense burner. Both the lions are very weathered, but the low relief representation of their fur is still visible on their rumps. The incense burner is old, but do not show any dedicatory inscription.

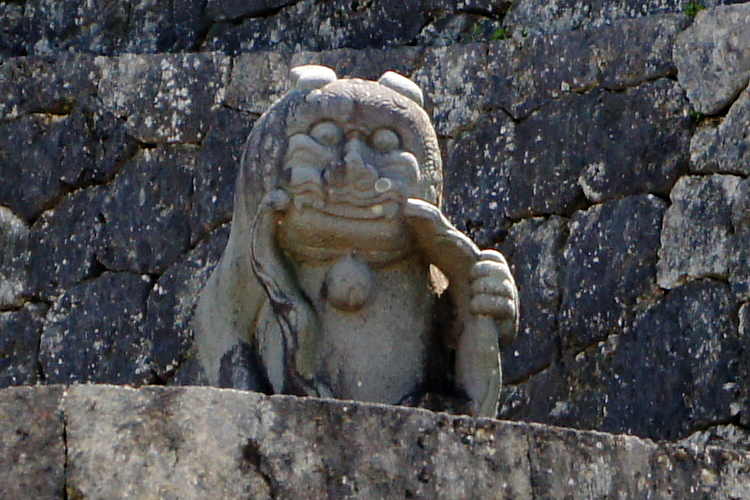
Protective shishi of Tama-udun

In Okinawa, shishis are generally protective divinities associated to villages or individual residences, but there is a tradition in China that places shishis as tomb protectors as well. Protective shishis also exist for the royal mausoleum of Tama-udun in Shuri and for the eastern room (King Shō Nei's tomb) of Urasoe yōdore. The shishis of Tama-udun, that have been designated as tangible cultural property at the prefectural level, show the same position with their front legs higher.

The stone lions of the Oroku-baka tomb are important historical documents because they are rare exemples in Okinawa of shishis associated with tombs, because also of their likening to the shishis of Tama-udun and because they give light on historical techniques for stone sculpture. They have been designated as tangible cultural properties, "sculpture" category, at the municipal level (市指定有形文化財[彫刻]).
