= Okinawa International University Junior College =

- 沖縄国際大学短期大学部
- Type: Private
- Active: 1972–1997
- Faculty: Japanese Literature; English Literature; Economics; Commerce
- Location: Ginowan, Okinawa, Japan

Okinawa International University Junior College (沖縄国際大学短期大学部, Okinawa Kokusai Daigaku Tanki Daigakubu) was a junior college in Ginowan, Okinawa, Japan.

The institute was founded in 1972 and was closed in 1999.
