= Wakio Mitsui =

Japanese politician (1942–2021)

- 三井 辨雄
- Official portrait, 2010

Minister of Health, Labour and Welfare
- In office 1 October 2012 – 26 December 2012
- Prime Minister: Yoshihiko Noda
- Preceded by: Yoko Komiyama
- Succeeded by: Norihisa Tamura

Member of the House of Representatives
- In office 25 June 2000 – 16 November 2012
- Preceded by: Multi-member district
- Succeeded by: Takamori Yoshikawa
- Constituency: Hokkaido PR (2000–2003); Hokkaido 2nd (2003–2012)

Personal details
- Born: 24 November 1942 Sapporo, Hokkaido, Japan
- Died: 1 April 2021 (aged 78) Sapporo, Hokkaido, Japan
- Party: Democratic
- Other political affiliations: New Frontier (1996–1998)
- Education: Showa Pharmaceutical University

Wakio Mitsui (三井 辨雄, Mitsui Wakio; 24 November 1942 – 1 April 2021) was a Japanese politician of the Democratic Party of Japan, a member of the House of Representatives in the Diet (national legislature). A native of Sapporo, Hokkaido and graduate of Showa Pharmaceutical University, he was elected to the House of Representatives for the first time in 2000 after an unsuccessful run in 1996.
