= Showa Pharmaceutical University =

Coordinates: 35°33′13″N 139°28′12.9″E

- 昭和薬科大学
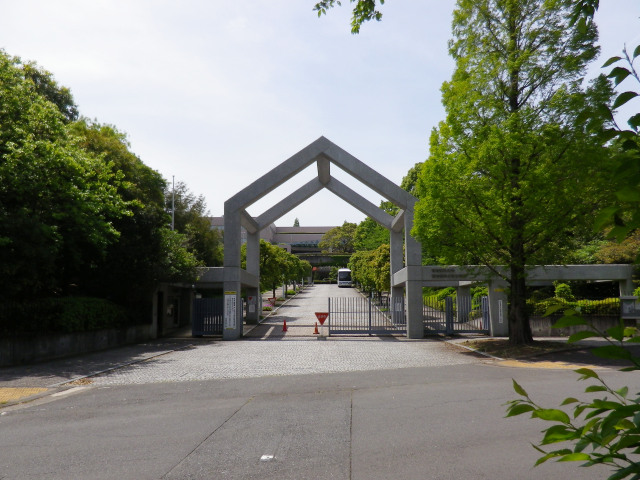
- Machida campus in May 2016
- Type: Private
- Established: Founded 1930; Chartered 1949
- Academic staff: 207 (132 full-time)
- Undergraduates: 1115
- Postgraduates: 43
- Location: Machida, Tokyo, Japan
- Website: www.shoyaku.ac.jp

Showa Pharmaceutical University (昭和薬科大学, Shōwa yakka daigaku) is a private university at Machida, Tokyo, Japan. The predecessor, Showa Women's Pharmaceutical Junior College, was founded in 1930, and it was chartered as a university in 1949.

== History ==
The university was originally founded as the Showa Women's Pharmaceutical Junior College in 1930, and became the Showa Women's College of Pharmaceutical Sciences in 1949. In 1950, co-ed education began, and the college was accordingly renamed as the Showa College of Pharmaceutical Sciences.

Construction of a new campus in Machida began in 1985. The university relocated there in 1990.

== Alumni ==
- Wakio Mitsui – politician
