= Ginowan, Okinawa =

City in Okinawa Prefecture, Japan

Ginowan 宜野湾市 Jinōn
- City
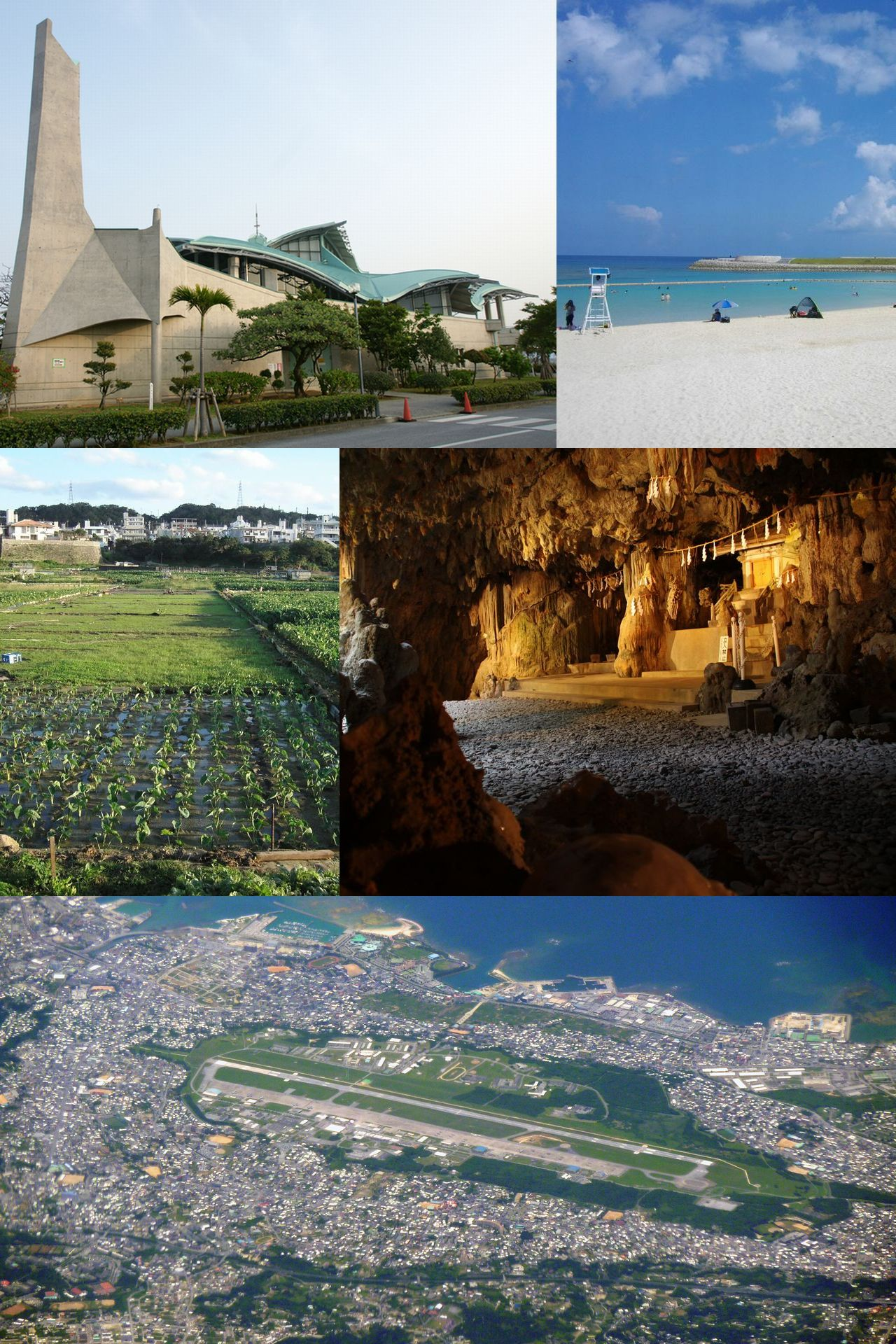
- Ginowan City Montage

- Flag Seal
- Interactive map of Ginowan
- Coordinates: 26°16′54″N 127°46′42″E
- Country: Japan
- Region: Kyushu
- Prefecture: Okinawa Prefecture

Government
  - Mayor: Atsushi Sakima (since February 2012)

Area
  - Total: 19.51 km^{2} (7.53 sq mi)

Population (February 2024)
  - Total: 100,319
  - Density: 5,142/km^{2} (13,320/sq mi)
- Time zone: UTC+9 (Japan Standard Time)
- Tree: Thurs ebony
- Flower: Chrysanthemum, Santanka
- Phone number: 098-893-4411
- Address: 1-1-1 Nodake, Ginowan-shi, Okinawa-ken; 901–2710
- Website: www.city.ginowan.okinawa.jp(in Japanese)

Ginowan (Japanese: 宜野湾市, Hepburn: Ginowan-shi; Okinawan: ジノーン, romanized: Jinōn) is a city located in Okinawa Prefecture, Japan. As of 2024, the city has an estimated population of 100,319, with 47,490 households and a population density of 5,142 persons per km^{2}. The total area is 19.51 km^{2}.

The city borders Chatan to the west, Okinawa City to the north, Urasoe to the south and Nishihara to the east.

== History ==
Ginowan was heavily damaged during World War II. After the war, half of the area of the city was allocated for use by the United States military. A refugee camp was built in the Nodake area of Ginowan. The population of the refugee camp increased exponentially, and the area was renamed Nodake City. The American occupation forces abolished Nodake City in 1946, and renamed the area Ginowan Village. Subsequently, the occupation authorities confiscated the main areas of Ginowan to build military bases. The area became a base town with military bases centered in Nodaka and Futenma.

Around 33% of Ginowan has been leased by the Japanese Ministry of Defense for use as a US military base under the Japanese and American mutual defense agreement. and hosts Marine Corps Air Station Futenma and part of the Marine Corps' Camp Foster. Ginowan was elevated to city status on July 1, 1962.

== Geography ==
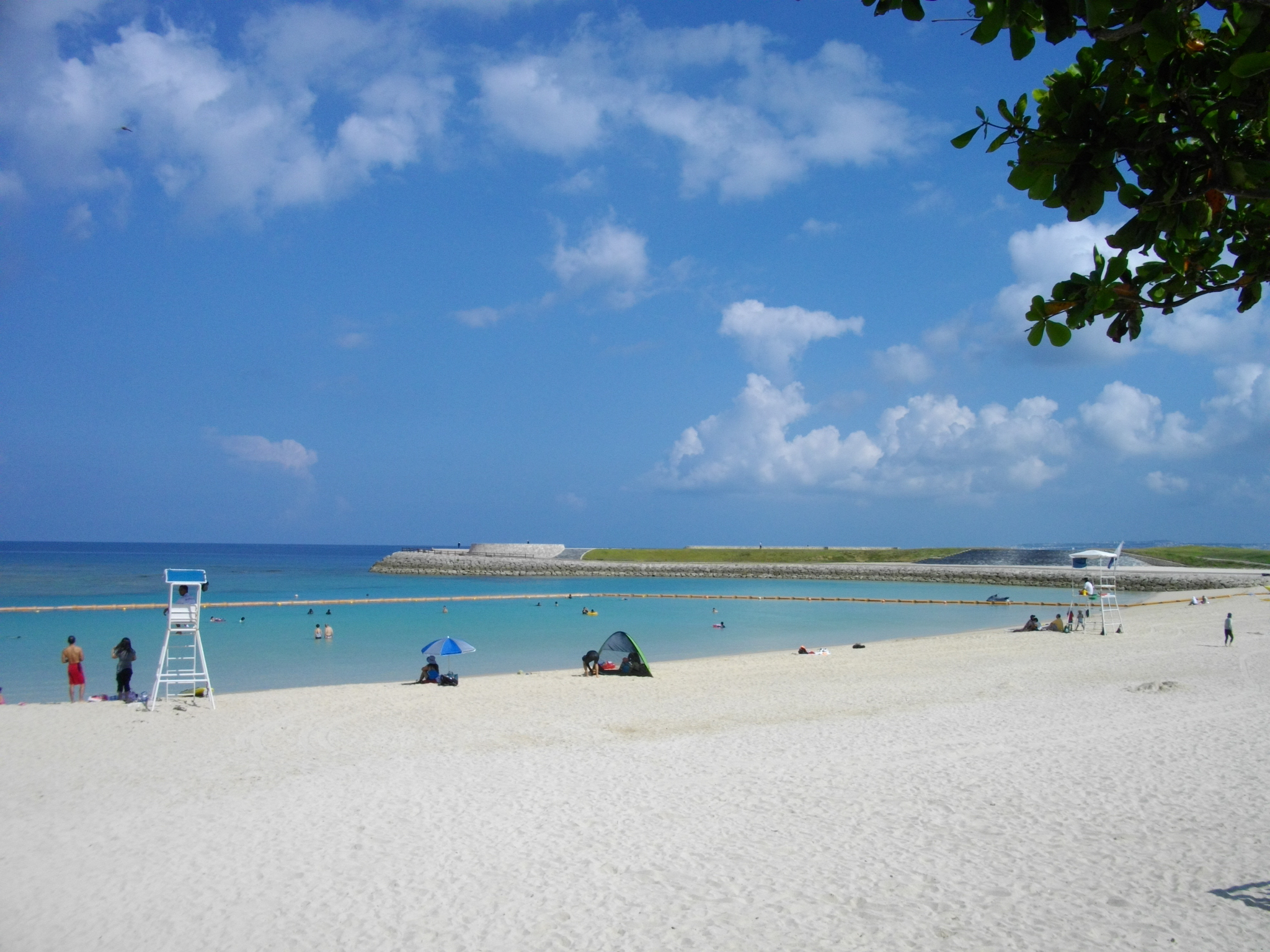
A tropical beach in Ginowan

Ginowan is located in the south of Okinawa, and sits on the western coast of the island along the East China Sea. The city sits on gently-sloping coastal terrace composed of Ryukyuan limestone. 38% of the city is occupied by military bases used by the United States.

=== Administrative divisions ===
The city includes seventeen wards.

- Aichi (愛知)
- Aragusuku (新城)
- Futenma (普天間)
- Ganeko (我如古)
- Ginowan (宜野湾)
- Isa (伊佐)
- Kakazu (嘉数)
- Kiyuna (喜友名)
- Maehara (真栄原)
- Mashiki (真志喜)
- Nagata (長田)
- Nakahara (中原)
- Nodake (野嵩)
- Ōjana (大謝名)
- Ōyama (大山)
- Samashita (佐真下)
- Ujidomari (宇地泊)

=== Neighboring municipalities ===
Clockwise, starting north, Ginowan borders on the following municipalities in Okinawa Prefecture:

- Chatan
- Kitanakagusuku
- Nakagusuku
- Nishihara
- Urasoe

Its tourist attractions include two castle ruins.

== Environmental investigation ==
Japanese officials found dozens of abandoned metal drums in October 2013 when they entered the base with US permission to look for buried cultural property, The officials did not report this to the Ginowan city's mayor until March 2014. "No unusual odor or color change in soil" was detected and no health problems have been actively "reported by residents living around the base". Ginowan city government called the Japanese defense ministry to investigate for "possible environmental impacts". The Japanese Defense Minister Itsunori Onodera said: "We will take appropriate measures in cooperation with the United States and the city of Ginowan" as they plan environmental studies on soil in the week of March 18, 2014. The United States rarely allow environmental inspections on U.S. bases not planned for return to Japan.

== Economy ==
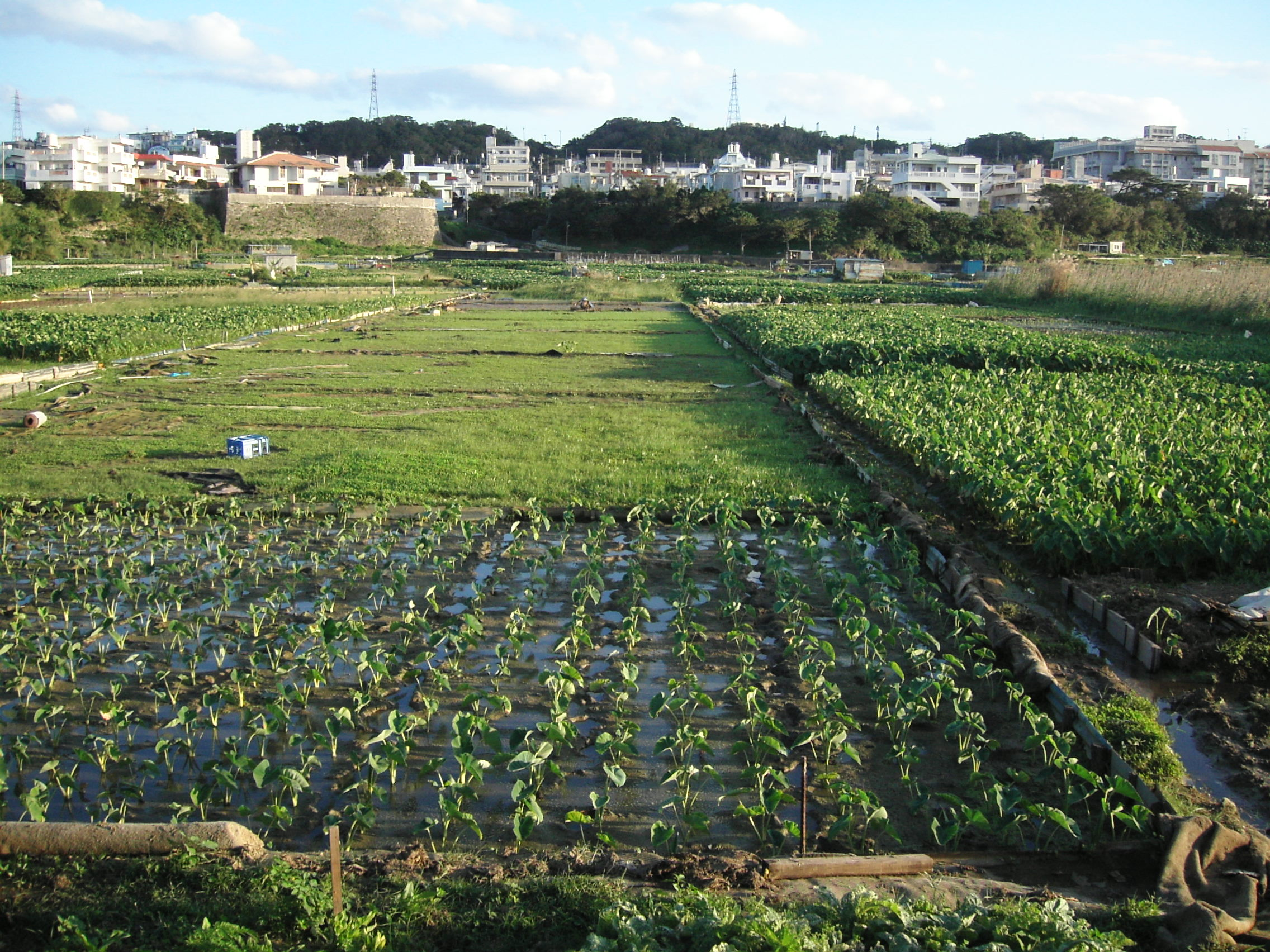
Taimo taro fields in Ginowan

Ginowan has been economically dependent on the United States military. The city is home to taro, specifically the taimo (田芋) used in Okinawa cuisine. While the taimo remains the chief product of Ginowan, agriculture greatly declined in the city in the postwar period. Like other municipalities on Okinawa Island, the city produces cut flowers for sale on the home islands of Japan.

== Arts and culture ==
The Okinawa Convention Center was constructed in Ginowan, and has hosted numerous international conferences. The city is also home to the Okinawa Prefectural Ginowan Marina, the Ginowan Municipal Museum, and the Sakima Art Museum.

== Historic sites ==
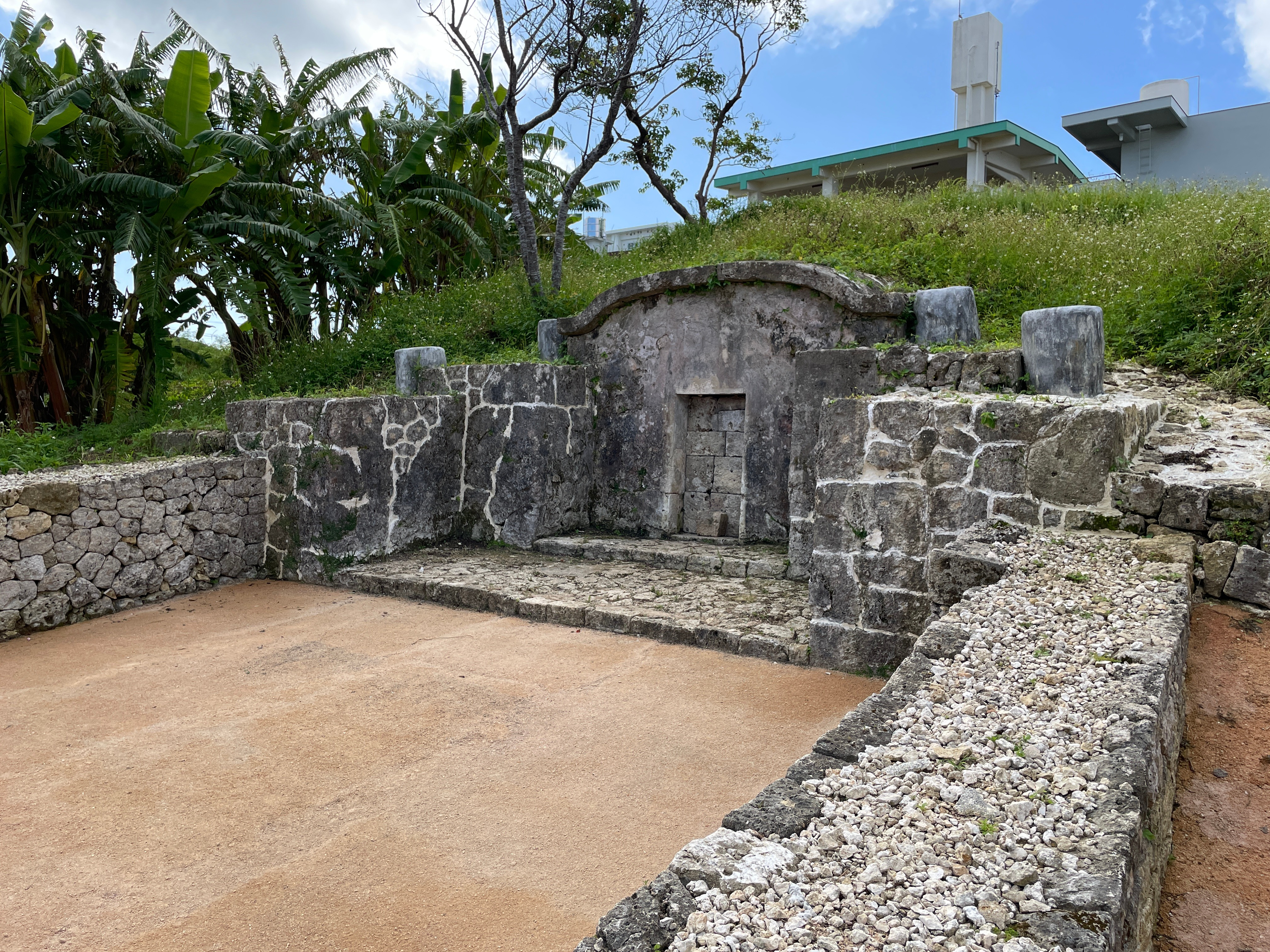
Motobu Udun Tomb Inner Yard

In the recent decades, several turtleback tombs in Ginowan City were studied academically and some were designated cultural assets of Ginowan City, such as the Motobu Udun Tomb in Ganeko, Ginowan. The Motobu Udun Tomb is considered valuable for research on the relationship between the royal family and the Ginowan District of the time, the construction of ancient turtleback tombs, and their transformations. On February 25, 2021, the Motobu Udun Tomb was designated a cultural property historical site by Ginowan City in recognition of its high value as a material that unravels the relationship between Ginowan District and royal descendants at that time.

== Education ==
Ginowan was home to the former Okinawa International University Junior College.

== Government ==
Ginowan is run by a city assembly of 28 elected members.

== Transportation ==
=== Roads ===
Ginowan is crossed by Japan National Route 58, which stretches across segments of Kyūshū, Tanegashima, Amami Ōshima, and Okinawa, and Japan National Route 330, which connects the city of Okinawa and the prefectural capital of Naha. Both highways are routed around the U.S. military bases. The Okinawa Expressway, which connects Nago to Naha, runs along the eastern border of the Ginowan.

== Cultural properties ==
- Name (Japanese) (Type of registration)

=== Cultural properties ===
- Chunnā-gā spring (喜友名泉) (National)
- Mashiki Sakima family documents (真志喜佐喜真家文書) (Municipal)
- Mayā-gama cave site in Ōyama (大山マヤーガマ洞穴遺跡) (Municipal)
- Meiji land registry map (明治土地台帳附属地図) (Municipal)
- Motobu Udun tomb (本部御殿墓) (Municipal)
- Oroku-baka tomb (小禄墓) (Prefectural)
- Oroku-baka tomb stone incense burner (小禄墓石彫香炉) (Municipal)
- Oroku-baka tomb stone lions (小禄墓石彫獅子) (Municipal)
- Oroku-baka tomb stone zushi (小禄墓内石厨子) (Prefectural)

=== Folk cultural properties ===
- Hījā-gā spring in Ganeko (我如古ヒージャーガー) (Municipal)
- Nūru-gā spring of Kamiyama / Aichi (神山・愛知ヌールガー) (Municipal)
- Stone lions of Kiyuna (喜友名の石獅子群) (Municipal)

=== Historic sites ===
- Iri-mui inscription (西森碑記) (Municipal)
- Kushi-nu-kā spring in Nodake (野嵩クシヌカー) (Municipal)
- Mē-nu-kā spring in Ōjana (大謝名メーヌカー) (Municipal)
- Ōyama Shell Mound (大山貝塚) (National)
- Ōyama Utaki sacred site stele (大山御嶽碑) (Municipal)
- Paved road in Nodake (野嵩石畳道) (Municipal)
- Saaten-bashi Bridge construction stele in Isahama (伊佐浜「新造佐阿天橋碑」) (Municipal)
- Survey stone of Isa, marked "WA Taketaubaru" (伊佐「ワ たけたう原」銘の印部土手) (Municipal)

=== Places of scenic beauty ===
- Futenma-gū cave (普天満宮洞穴) (Municipal)
- Ginowan City Mori-no-kawa spring (宜野湾市森の川) (Prefectural)

=== Natural monuments ===
- Ōjana Mē-nu-kā fresh water red algae (大謝名メーヌカー淡水紅藻) (Municipal)
