= List of Natural Monuments of Japan (Okinawa) =

This list is of the Natural Monuments of Japan within the Prefecture of Okinawa.

== National Natural Monuments ==
As of 1 May 2021, fifty-six Monuments have been designated, including five *Special Natural Monuments.

Monument	Municipality	Comments	Image	Coordinates	Type	Ref.
*Oriental stork Ciconia boyciana コウノトリ kōnotori					1.2	
*Short-tailed albatross Phoebastria albatrus アホウドリ ahōdori					1.2	
*Okinawa woodpecker Dendrocopos noguchii ノグチゲラ noguchigera					1.1	
*Iriomote cat Prionailurus bengalensis iriomotensis イリオモテヤマネコ; Iriomote yamaneko					1.1	
*Crested serpent eagle Spilornis cheela カンムリワシ kanmuri-washi					1.1	
Ryukyu robin Erithacus komadori アカヒゲ akahige					1.1	
Concave land hermit crab Coenobita cavipes オカヤドカリ okayadokari					1.1, 2	
Japanese wood pigeon Columba janthina カラスバト karasu-bato					1.2	
Dugong; Dugong dugon ジュゴン jugon					1.2	
Ryukyu long-tailed giant rat Diplothrix legata ケナガネズミ kenaga-nezumi					1.2	
Tokudaia; Diplothrix legata トゲネズミ toge-nezumi		the genus comprises three endemic species of spiny rat			1.1	
Yellow-margined box turtle Cuora flavomarginata セマルハコガメ semaruhako-game					1.1	
Ryukyuan common emerald dove Chalcophaps indica yamashinai リュウキュウキンバト; Ryūkyū kin-bato					1.1	
Daitō fruit bat Pteropus dasymallus daitoensis ダイトウオオコウモリ; Daitō ookoumori					1.1	
Japanese murrelet Synthliboramphus wumizusume カンムリウミスズメ kanmuri umisuzume					1.1	
Ijima's leaf warbler Phylloscopus ijimae イイジマムシクイ; Iijima mushikui					1.1	
Kishinoue's giant skink Plestiodon kishinouyei キシノウエトカケ; Kishnoue-togake					1.1	
Ryukyu black-breasted leaf turtle Geoemyda japonica リュウキュウヤマガメ; Ryūkyū yama-game					1.1	
Okinawa rail Gallirallus okinawae ヤンバルクイナ; Yanbaru kuina					1.1	
Yanbaru long-armed scarab beetle Cheirotonus jambar ヤンバルテナガコガネ; Yanbaru tenagakogane					1.1	
Kerama deer and their habitat Cervus nippon keramae ケラマジカおよびその生息地; Kerama-jika oyobi sono seisokuchi	Zamami			26°12′58″N 127°14′40″E	1.1	
Ubundoru Satake palm communities Satakentia liukiuensis ウブンドルのヤエヤマヤシ群落; Ubundoru no yaeyama-yashi gunraku	Taketomi	on Iriomote		24°18′37″N 123°50′54″E	2.2	
Ntanāra Looking-glass mangrove communities Heritiera littoralis ンタナーラのサキシマスオウノキ群落; Ntanāra no Sakishima suōnoki gunraku	Ishigaki			24°20′22″N 124°09′14″E	2.2	
Aha Tanaga-gumui plant communities 安波のタナガーグムイの植物群落; Aha no Tanagā-gumui shokubutsu gunraku	Kunigami			26°43′27″N 128°17′06″E	2.2	
Iheya Island Nentō Hiramatsu; Pinus luchuensis 伊平屋島の念頭平松; Iheya-jima no nentō hiramatsu	Iheya			27°02′21″N 127°58′07″E	2.1	
Shio River 塩川; Shio-gawa	Motobu			26°36′57″N 127°53′42″E	3.9	
Shimojishima Tōri-ike 下地島の通り池; Shimoji-jima no Tōri-ike	Miyakojima	also a Place of Scenic Beauty		24°49′30″N 125°08′15″E	3.6, 7, 9	
Kiyan Coast and Arasaki Coast 喜屋武海岸及び荒崎海岸; Kiyan kaigan oyobi Arasaki kaigan	Itoman	also a Place of Scenic Beauty		26°07′48″N 127°39′55″E	2.3, 5; 3.9	
Kudaka Island coastal plant communities 久高島の海岸植物群落; Kudaka-jima no kaigan shokubutsu gunraku	Nanjō			26°09′39″N 127°53′12″E	2.2	
Kumejima five-branch pine 久米の五枝のマツ; Kume no goeda no matsu	Kumejima			26°21′31″N 126°44′33″E	2.1	
Kumejima Ōjima Tatami-ishi 久米島町奥武島の畳石; Kumejima Ōjima tatami ishi	Kumejima			26°20′25″N 126°48′19″E		
Miyako-jima limestone terraces 宮古島保良の石灰華段丘; Miyakojima hora no sekkai-ka dankyū	Miyakojima			24°48′21″N 125°16′50″E		
Miyara River mangrove forest 宮良川のヒルギ林; Miyara-gawa no hirgui-rin	Ishigaki			24°21′37″N 124°12′35″E	2.2	
Gesashi Bay mangrove forest 慶佐次湾のヒルギ林; Gesaji-wan no hirgui-rin	Higashi			26°36′19″N 128°08′34″E	2.2	
Komi Looking-glass mangrove communities Heritiera littoralis 古見のサキシマスオウノキ群落; Komi no Sakishima suōnoki gunraku	Taketomi	on Iriomote		24°18′45″N 123°54′17″E	2.1, 2	
Ara River Formosan cherry habitat Prunus campanulata 荒川のカンヒザクラ自生地; Ara-kawa no kanhizakura jiseichi	Ishigaki			24°26′22″N 124°11′05″E	2.2	
Shima-chisujinori in Shikina-en; Thorea gaudichaudii 識名園のシマチスジノリ発生地; Shikina-en no shima-chisujinori hassei-chi	Naha			26°12′14″N 127°42′56″E	2.12	
Shurikinjō giant Bishop wood Bischofia javanica 首里金城の大アカギ; Shurikinjō no ōakagi	Naha			26°12′57″N 127°42′58″E	2.1	
Shoshi utaki plant communities 諸志御嶽の植物群落; Shoshi utaki no shokubutsu gunraku	Nakijin			26°41′40″N 127°56′46″E	2.1, 2	
Hoshitate Natural Protected Area 星立天然保護区域; Hoshitate tennen hogo kuiki	Taketomi	on Iriomote		24°23′46″N 123°45′54″E		
Ishigaki east coast tsunami rocks 石垣島東海岸の津波石群; Ishigaki-jima higashi kaigan no tsunami ishi-gun	Ishigaki	left behind by the 1771 Great Yaeyama Tsunami		24°20′45″N 124°12′01″E		
Funaura Nipa palm communities Nypa fruticans 船浦のニッパヤシ群落; Funaura no nippayashi gunraku	Taketomi	on Iriomote		24°23′49″N 123°48′40″E	2.10	
Ōike Black mangrove communities Bruguiera gymnorhiza 大池のオヒルギ群落; Ōike no ohirugi gunraku	Minamidaitō			25°51′26″N 131°14′19″E	2.5	
Nakanokami Island sea bird breeding grounds 仲の神島海鳥繁殖地; Nakanokami-shima kaichō hanshokuchi	Taketomi			24°11′40″N 123°33′46″E	1.3	
Nakama River Natural Protected Area 仲間川天然保護区域; Nakama-gawa tennen hogo kuiki	Taketomi	on Iriomote		24°17′13″N 123°52′10″E		
Nagahagu cliff and scree special plant communities 長幕崖壁及び崖錐の特殊植物群落; Nagahagu gaiheki oyobi gaisui no tokushu shokubutsu gunraku	Kitadaitō			25°56′12″N 131°18′04″E	2.3, 12	
Takō Gogan plant communities 田港御願の植物群落; Takō gogan no shokubutsu gunraku	Ōgimi			26°40′05″N 128°07′33″E	2.1, 2	
Minamidaitō east coast plant communities 南大東島東海岸植物群落; Ōike no ohirugi gunraku	Minamidaitō			25°49′58″N 131°15′58″E	2.5, 12	
Yabiji 八重干瀬; Yabiji	Miyakojima	also a Place of Scenic Beauty		24°59′56″N 125°15′53″E		
Hirakubo Yaeyama rosewood Pterocarpus vidalianus 平久保のヤエヤマシタン; Hirakubo no Yaeyama shitan	Ishigaki			24°35′04″N 124°19′21″E	2.1	
Hirakubo Yasura Lantern tree communities Hernandia nymphaeaefolia 平久保安良のハスノハギリ群落; Hirakubo Yasura no hasunohagiri gunraku	Ishigaki			24°20′22″N 124°09′14″E		
Yonehara Satake palm communities Satakentia liukiuensis 米原のヤエヤマヤシ群落; Yonehara no yaeyama-yashi gunraku	Ishigaki			24°26′42″N 124°11′37″E	2.2	
Nago "Hinpun Gajumaru"; Ficus microcarpa 名護のひんぷんガジュマル; Nago no hinpun gajumaru	Nago			26°35′14″N 127°59′09″E	2.1	
Nago City Kayō folds 名護市嘉陽層の褶曲; Nago-shi kayō-sō no shūkyoku	Nago			26°35′30″N 127°58′39″E	3.1, 2, 3	
Mount Yonaha Natural Protected Area 与那覇岳天然保護区域; Yonaha-dake tennen hogo kuiki	Kunigami			26°42′43″N 128°13′25″E		
Iheya Island Ubame oak communities Quercus phillyraeoides 伊平屋島のウバメガシ群落; Iheya-jima no ubamegashi gunraku	Iheya			27°02′24″N 127°58′04″E		

== Prefectural Natural Monuments ==
As of 1 May 2021, fifty Monuments have been designated at a prefectural level.

Monument	Municipality	Comments	Image	Coordinates	Type	Ref.
Great nawab Polyura eudamippus フタオチョウ; Futao-chō						for all refs see
Orange oakleaf Kallima inachus コノハチョウ; Konoha-chō						
Ochlodes asahinai アサヒナキマダラセセリ; Asahinakimadara-seseri		skipper butterfly found on Ishigaki and Iriomote				
Anderson's crocodile newt Echinotriton andersoni イボイモリ; Iboimori						
Kuroiwa's ground gecko Goniurosaurus kuroiwae クロイワトカゲモドキ; Kuroiwa tokagemodoki		designation includes the subspecies Goniurosaurus kuroiwae orientalis (マダラトカゲモドキ)				
Atlas moth Attacus atlas ryukyuensis ヨナグニサン; Yonagunisan						
Kikuzato's brook snake Opisthotropis kikuzatoi キクザトサワヘビ; Kikuzato sawahebi						
Holst's frog Babina holsti ホルストガエル; Horusuto-gaeru						
Okinawa wart frog Limnonectes namiyei ナミエガエル; Namie-gaeru						
Ishikawa's frog Odorrana ishikawae イシカワガエル; Ishikawa-gaeru						
Yonaguni Mount Urabu Atlas moth habitat Attacus atlas ryukyuensis 与那国島宇良部岳ヨナグニサン生息地; Yonaguni-jima Urabu-dake yonagunisan seisokuchi	Yonaguni			24°27′05″N 123°00′13″E		
Miyako pony 宮古馬; Miyako uma	Miyako					
Chaan chicken チャーン; Chaan	Uruma					
Amami woodcock Scolopax mira アマミヤマシギ; Amami yamashigi						
Kumejima firefly Luciola owadai クメジマボタル; Kumejima botaru						
Ryukyu Inu 琉球犬; Ryūkyū inu						
Miyako freshwater crab Geothelphusa miyakoensis ミヤコサワガニ; Miyako sawagani						
Miyako grass lizard Takydromus toyamai ミヤコカナヘビ; Miyako kana-hebi						
Amesoko Shima-chisujinori 天底のシマチスジノリ; Amesoko no shimachisujinori	Nakijin			26°40′45″N 127°58′43″E		
Imadomari tropical almond Terminalia catappa 今泊のコバテイシ; Imadomari no kobateishi	Nakijin			26°42′10″N 127°55′46″E		
Mount Kuba 田名のクバ山; Dana no Kuba-yama	Iheya			27°05′28″N 128°01′13″E		
Izena Castle Site Selaginella tamariscina communities 伊是名城跡のイワヒバ群落; Izena-jō ato no iwahiba gunraku	Izena			26°54′53″N 127°57′09″E		
Funauki Yaeyama hamago Vitex trifolia var. bicolor 船浮のヤエヤマハマゴウ; Funauki no Yaeyama hamago	Taketomi			24°20′17″N 123°43′43″E		
Miyatori-on Ehretia dichotoma 宮鳥御嶽のリュウキュウチシャノキ; Miyatori-on no Ryūkyū chishanoki	Ishigaki			24°20′17″N 123°43′43″E		
Une Sago palm Cycas revoluta 宇根の大ソテツ; Une no ōsotetsu	Kumejima			26°20′59″N 126°48′43″E		
Aha Looking-glass mangrove Heritiera littoralis 安波のサキシマスオウノキ; Aha no Sakishima suōnoki	Kunigami			26°42′57″N 128°17′11″E		
Sashiki Fusozaki coast Myoporum bontioides communities 敷町冨祖崎海岸のハマジンチョウ群落; Sashiki-chō Fusozaki kaigan no hamajinchō gunraku	Nanjō			26°10′42″N 127°47′29″E		
Maja Garcinia subelliptica 真謝のチュラフクギ; Maja no chura fukugi	Kumejima			26°21′06″N 126°48′35″E		
Cape Manza limestone plant communities 万座毛石灰岩植物群落; Manza-mō sekkaigan shokubutsu gunraku	Onna			26°30′16″N 127°51′02″E		
Nakasuji Nebaru-utaki subtropical coastal forest 仲筋村ネバル御嶽の亜熱帯海岸林; Nakasuji-mura Nebaru-utaki no anettai kaigan rin	Ishigaki			24°26′52″N 124°09′22″E		
Miyazatomae-utaki Angiosperm forest Hernandia nymphaeaefolia Kubizki 宮里前の御嶽のハスノハギリ林; Miyazatomae no utaki no hasunohagiri rin	Nago			26°35′39″N 127°58′20″E		
Nago guard-house site Fukugi trees Garcinia subelliptica 名護番所跡のフクギ群; Nago bansho ato no fukugi-gun	Nago			26°35′10″N 127°59′12″E		
Ōgimi-utaki Fountain palm communities Livistona chinensis 大宜味御嶽のビロウ群落; Ōgimi-utaki no birō gunraku	Ōgimi			26°42′02″N 128°07′12″E		
Kuninaka-utaki plant communities 国仲御嶽の植物群落; Kuninaka-utaki no shokubutsu gunraku	Miyakojima			24°49′37″N 125°10′27″E		
Shiokawa-utaki plant communities and Fukugi trees 塩川御嶽の植物群落並びにフクギ並木; Shiokawa-utaki no shokubutsu gunraku narabini fukugi namiki	Tarama			24°39′55″N 124°42′40″E		
Ungusuku-utaki Fukugi tree communities 運城御嶽のフクギ群落; Ungusuku-utaki no fukugi gunraku	Tarama			24°40′21″N 124°42′08″E		
Tarama Island Ntabaru-utaki plant communities 多良間島の土原御嶽の植物群落; Tarama-jima no Ntabaru-utaki no shokubutsu gunraku	Tarama			24°40′06″N 124°42′02″E		
Tarama Island Minebaru plant communities 多良間島の嶺原の植物群落; Tarama-jima no Minebaru no shokubutsu gunraku	Tarama			24°40′06″N 124°42′02″E		
Tarama Island Hōgo forest 多良間島の抱護林; Tarama-jima no hōgo rin	Tarama			24°39′15″N 124°43′34″E		
Akara-utaki Quercus phillyraeoides and Okinawa pine plant communities Pinus luchuensis アカラ御嶽のウバメガシ及びリュウキュウマツ等の植物群落の植物群落; Akara-utaki no ubamegashi oyobi Ryūkyū-matsu tō no shokubutsu gunraku	Izena			26°55′07″N 127°57′30″E		
Higashi-hennazaki raised coral coast and plant communities 東平安名岬の隆起珊瑚礁海岸風衝植物群落; Higashi-hennazaki no ryūki sangoshō kaigan fūshō shokubutsu gunraku	Miyakojima			24°43′08″N 125°28′10″E		
Aguni Nishi-no-Ugan plant communities 粟国村字西の御願の植物群落; Aguni-son aza nishi no ugan no shokubutsu gunraku	Aguni			26°34′55″N 127°13′25″E		
Hiji Kodama Forest plant communities 比地の小玉森の植物群落; Hiji no Kodama-mori no shokubutsu gunraku	Kunigami			26°43′39″N 128°10′42″E		
Kumaya Cave くまや洞窟; Kumaya dōkutsu	Iheya			27°05′30″N 128°01′00″E		
Nakashima giant stone 仲島の大石; Nakashima no ōishi	Naha	also a Prefectural Historic Site		26°12′41″N 127°40′37″E		
Kijoka Itajiki coast itabishi 喜如嘉板敷海岸の板干瀬; Kijoka Itajiki kaigan no itabishi	Ōgimi			26°42′19″N 128°08′07″E		
Motobu Ōishibaru Ammonite fossils 本部町大石原のアンモナイト化石; Motobu-chō Ōishibaru no anmonaito kaseki	Motobu			26°41′35″N 127°52′30″E		
Kitadaitō Nakano Hokusendō Cave 北大東村字中野の北泉洞; Kitadaitō-son aza Nakano no Hokusen-dō	Kitadaitō			25°56′59″N 131°18′28″E		
Mount Katsuu, Mount Awa, and Mount Yae Nature Reserve 嘉津宇岳安和岳八重岳自然保護区; Katsuu-dake Awa-dake Yae-dake shizen hogoku	Nago, Motobu			26°37′52″N 127°56′06″E		
Yonaguni Mount Kubura Natural Protected Area 与那国島久部良岳天然保護区域; Yonaguni-jima Kubura-dake tennen hogo kuiki	Yonaguni			24°27′18″N 122°57′29″E		

== Municipal Natural Monuments ==
As of 1 May 2021, one hundred and twenty-three Monuments have been designated at a municipal level.

Monument	Municipality	Comments	Image	Coordinates	Type	Ref.
Ada Planchonella obovata Forest Reserve 安田のアカテツ保安林; Ada no akatetsu hoan-rin	Kunigami			26°44′42″N 128°19′01″E		for all refs see
Shioya-ufuncha Lantern trees Hernandia nymphaeifolia 塩屋ウフンチャのハスノハギリ; Shioya-ufuncha no hasunohagiri	Ōgimi			26°40′18″N 128°06′22″E		
Looking-glass mangrove Heritiera littoralis サキシマスオウノキ; Sakishima suōnoki	Higashi					
Magnolia compressa オガタマノキ; Ogatamanoki	Higashi			26°36′15″N 128°07′14″E		
Nakasone Kakihatahara Nahakihagi communities Dendrolobium umbellatum 仲宗根垣畑原のナハキハギ群落; Nakasone Kakihatahara no nahakihagi gunraku	Nakijin					
Ōhama foraminiferal limestone 大浜の有孔虫石灰岩; Ōhama no yūkōchū sekkaigan	Motobu			26°39′26″N 127°52′58″E		
Okinawa Little Japanese horseshoe bat Rhinolophus pumilus pumilus オキナワコキクガシラコウモリ; Okinawa kokikugashira kōmori	Nago					
Sumuide sea fig Ficus superba 済井出のアコウ; Sumuide no akō	Nago			26°40′06″N 128°01′14″E		
Ōshittai Quercus miyagii オキナワウラジロガシ; Ōshittai no Okinawa urajirogashi	Nago			26°37′48″N 128°04′40″E		
Agarie sea mango Cerbera manghas 東江のミフクラギ; Agarie no mifukuragi	Nago			26°34′57″N 127°59′15″E		
Kyoda Ubame oaks Quercus phillyraeoides 許田のウバメガシ; Kyoda no ubamegashi	Nago			26°32′32″N 127°58′20″E		
Sokoniya Okami-matsu 底仁屋の御神松; Sokoniya okamimatsu	Nago			26°34′23″N 128°07′20″E		
Yabu Elementary School deigo Erythrina variegata 屋部小学校のデイゴ; Yabu shōgakkō no deigo	Nago			26°36′05″N 127°57′13″E		
Yagaji Elementary School sea fig Ficus superba 屋我地小学校のアコウ; Yagaji shōgakkō no akō	Nago			26°39′20″N 128°00′30″E		
Ōura mangroves 大浦のマングローブ林; Ōura no mangurōbu-rin	Nago			26°33′33″N 128°02′33″E		
Makiya powder-puff trees Barringtonia racemosa 真喜屋のサガリバナ; Makiya no sagaribana	Nago			26°37′29″N 128°02′24″E		
Gyokusendō Cave 玉泉洞; Gyokusendō	Nanjō			26°08′14″N 127°45′07″E		
Ishigaki niinii Platypleura albivannata イシガキニイニイ; Ishigaki niinii	Ishigaki					
Fukidō River Rhizophoraceae communities 吹通川のヒルギ群落; Fukidō-gawa no hirugi gunraku	Ishigaki					
Obama-utaki Ehretia dichotoma 小浜御嶽のリュウキュウチシャノキ; Obama-utaki no Ryūkyū chishanoki	Ishigaki					
Old mulberry tree 桑の老木 kuwa no rōki	Taketomi	on Kuroshima Island				
Beach rosewood communities 浜シタン群落; Hama shitan gunraku	Taketomi	on Hateruma				
Hatoma Nakamui 鳩間中森; Hatoma Nakamui	Taketomi	on Hatoma		24°28′14″N 123°49′16″E		
Old tabu tree Machilus thunbergii タブの老木 tabu no rōki	Taketomi	on Iriomote		24°23′27″N 123°44′42″E		
Kamadoma kubadesa カマドマのクバデサー; Kamadoma no kubadesaa	Taketomi	on Iriomote				
Kōkihara gajumaru communities Ficus microcarpa コーキ原のガジュマル群落; Kōkihara no gajumaru gunraku	Taketomi	on Kohama Island				
Asabishibana アサビシバナ(遊び岩); Asabishibana (asobi-iwa)	Taketomi	on Kuroshima Island				
Yonaguni horse 与那国馬; Yonaguni uma	Yonaguni					
Irimaka large deigo Erythrina variegata 西真嘉大デイコ; Irimaka ō-deigo	Yonaguni					
Kubura Mittō wetlands 久部良ミットゥ湿地帯; Kubura mittō shitchitai	Yonaguni					
Aragabana zone アラガバナ一帯; Aragabana ittai	Yonaguni					
Angaimidōchi zone アンガイミドゥチ一帯; Angaimidōchi ittai	Yonaguni					

== See also ==
- Cultural Properties of Japan
- List of Places of Scenic Beauty of Japan (Okinawa)
- List of Historic Sites of Japan (Okinawa)
- List of parks and gardens of Okinawa Prefecture
