= List of places of scenic beauty of Japan (Okinawa) =

This list is of the places of scenic beauty of Japan located within the Prefecture of Okinawa.

== National Places of Scenic Beauty ==
As of 1 December 2025, fifteen Places have been designated at a national level (including one *Special Place of Scenic Beauty).

Place	Municipality	Comments	Image	Coordinates	Type	Ref.
*Shikina-en 識名園; Shikina-en	Naha	inscribed on the UNESCO World Heritage List as one of the Gusuku Sites and Related Properties of the Kingdom of Ryukyu		26°12′16″N 127°42′55″E	1	
Ieudun Detached Residence Gardens 伊江御殿別邸庭園; Ieudun bettei teien	Naha			26°13′38″N 127°43′29″E	1	
Iedunchi Gardens 伊江殿内庭園; Iedunchi teien	Naha			26°13′12″N 127°43′17″E	1	
Shimojishima Tōri-ike 下地島の通り池; Shimojishima Tōri-ike	Miyakojima	also a Natural Monument		24°49′30″N 125°08′15″E	5, 8	
Kiyan Coast and Arasaki Coast 喜屋武海岸及び荒崎海岸; Kiyan kaigan oyobi Arasaki kaigan	Itoman	also a Natural Monument		26°07′48″N 127°39′55″E	8	
Miyaradunchi Gardens 宮良殿内庭園; Miyaradunchi teien	Ishigaki			24°20′28″N 124°09′35″E	1	
Shuri Castle Shoin - Sasunoma Gardens 首里城書院・鎖之間庭園; Shuri-jō shoin・Sasunoma teien	Naha	inscribed on the UNESCO World Heritage List as one of the Gusuku Sites and Related Properties of the Kingdom of Ryukyu		26°12′59″N 127°43′09″E	1	
Ishigaki Family Gardens 石垣氏庭園; Ishigaki-shi teien	Ishigaki			24°20′41″N 124°09′20″E	1	
Kabira Bay - Mount Omoto 川平湾及び於茂登岳; Kabira-wan oyobi Omoto-dake	Ishigaki			24°27′07″N 124°08′34″E	8, 10, 11	
Cape Higashi-Henna 東平安名崎; Higashihenna-zaki	Miyakojima			24°43′31″N 125°27′38″E	8	
Yabiji 八重干瀬; Yabiji	Miyakojima	also a Natural Monument		24°59′56″N 125°15′53″E	8	
Tindabana ティンダバナ; Tindabana	Yonaguni			24°28′00″N 123°00′10″E	5	
Kubura Bali - Kubira Furishi 久部良バリ及び久部良フリシ; Kubura Bali oyobi Kubira Furishi	Yonaguni			24°28′00″N 123°00′10″E	8	
Amamiku-no-mori - Tenchiji-Amachiji - Kuba-no-utaki - Kudaka-no-Fubō-utaki アマミクヌムイ（アマミクの杜）今鬼神ノカナヒヤフ（テンチジアマチジ）及びこはおの御嶽（クバの御嶽） 久高コハウ森（久高のフボー御嶽） Amamiku-nu-mui (Amamiku-no-mori) Nakijin-no-kanahiyafu (Tenchiji Amachiji) oyobi Kohao-no-utaki (Kuba no utaki) Kudaka Kohau-mui (Kudaka-no-Fubō utaki)	Nakijin, Nanjō			26°40′57″N 127°58′22″E	8	
Sanninudai サンニヌ台; Sanninudai	Yonaguni	also a Natural Monument		24°27′13″N 123°02′00″E		

== Prefectural Places of Scenic Beauty ==
As of 1 May 2025, eight Places have been designated at a prefectural level.

Place	Municipality	Comments	Image	Coordinates	Type	Ref.
Sefa-utaki 斎場御嶽; Sefa-utaki	Nanjō	also an Historic Site; inscribed on the UNESCO World Heritage List as one of the Gusuku Sites and Related Properties of the Kingdom of Ryukyu		26°10′24″N 127°49′36″E		for all refs see
Nakagusuku Castle Site 中城城跡; Nakagusuku-jō ato	Nakagusuku	also an Historic Site		26°17′02″N 127°48′05″E		
Nakijin Castle Site 今帰仁城跡; Nakijin-jō ato	Nakijin	also an Historic Site		26°41′27″N 127°55′49″E		
Todoroki Falls 轟の滝; Todoroki no taki	Nago			26°33′45″N 127°59′18″E		
Shurikinjō-chō Ishidatami-michi 首里金城町石畳道; Shurikinjō-chō ishidatami-michi	Naha	also a Prefectural Historic Site		26°12′58″N 127°42′55″E		
Ie Village Mount Gusuku 伊江村の城山; Ie-mura no Gusuku-yama	Ie			26°43′10″N 127°48′25″E		
Ginowan City Mori River 宜野湾市森の川; Ginowan-shi Mori-no-kawa	Ginowan			26°16′17″N 127°44′30″E		
Cape Manzamō 万座毛; Manza-mō	Onna			26°30′18″N 127°51′01″E		

== Municipal Places of Scenic Beauty ==
As of 1 May 2025, a further twenty-two Places have been designated at a municipal level.

Place	Municipality	Comments	Image	Coordinates	Type	Ref.
Teniya Ban Sachi Beacon Site 天仁屋バンサチの火立跡; Teniya ban sachi no hitachi ato	Nago	also a Municipal Historic Site		26°33′13″N 128°08′17″E		for all refs see
Waji ワシ (also 湧出 or わじぃー); Wajī	Ie			26°43′59″N 127°47′22″E		
Innagā 犬名河(インナガー); Innagā	Uruma	on Ikei Island （伊計島）		26°23′44″N 127°59′40″E		
Futenma-gū Cave 普天満宮洞穴; Futenma-gū dōketsu	Ginowan			26°17′35″N 127°46′39″E		
Naminoue 波上; Naminoue	Naha	also a Municipal Historic Site		26°13′14″N 127°40′17″E		
Garner-Mui Forest ガーナー森; Gānā-mui	Naha	also a Natural Monument		26°12′03″N 127°40′40″E		
Gushikami Fukugi Avenue 具志頭のフクギ並木; Gushikami no fukugi namiki	Yaese			26°07′21″N 127°44′38″E		
Hanandā (Natural Bridge) ハナンダー（自然橋） Hanandā (shizen-bashi)	Yaese			26°07′14″N 127°44′38″E		
Hiyajō Banta 比屋定バンタ; Hiyajō banta	Kumejima			26°22′24″N 126°47′23″E		
Aka-no-Higemizu 阿嘉のひげ水; Aka-no-higemizu	Kumejima			26°22′00″N 126°47′44″E		
Aka-Kurushi 阿嘉黒石; Aka kurushi	Kumejima			26°22′10″N 126°48′12″E		
Ueda Forest 上田森; Ueda-mori	Kumejima			26°21′37″N 126°44′58″E		
Tokujimu Coast and Andesite Zone トクジム海岸と一帯の安山岩; Tokujimu kaigan to ittai no anzangan	Kumejima			26°17′39″N 126°48′47″E		
View of the Kerama Straits from Mount Nishi にし山(北山)山頂から望む慶良間海峡; Nishi-yama sanchō kara nozomu Kerama kaikyō	Tokashiki			26°12′36″N 127°21′46″E		
Scenic Spots of Banyahara 番屋原の広場の景勝地; Banyahara no hiroba no keishō-chi	Aguni			26°34′54″N 127°13′26″E		
Scenic Spots of Sakakinahara Coast 坂木那原海岸景勝地; Sakakinahara kaigan keishō-chi	Aguni			26°34′39″N 127°13′14″E		
Nzōmiji 無蔵水; Nzōmiji	Iheya			27°05′30″N 128°00′45″E		
Coral Reef and Lagoon at Sawada Beach 佐和田の浜珊瑚礁・礁湖面; Sawada-no-hama sangoshō・shōko-men	Miyakojima	within Irabu Prefectural Natural Park		24°50′19″N 125°09′31″E		
Rocky Coast at Cape Hakuchō 白鳥崎岩礁海岸一帯; Hakuchō-zaki ganshō kaigan ittai	Miyakojima	within Irabu Prefectural Natural Park		27°05′30″N 128°00′45″E		
Rocky Coast of West and South Shimojishima 下地島南、西岩礁海岸一帯; Shimojishima minami, nishi ganshō kaigan ittai	Miyakojima	within Irabu Prefectural Natural Park		24°48′49″N 125°08′28″E		
Scenery of Takana 高那の景勝; Takana no keishō	Taketomi	Hateruma Island		24°03′00″N 123°47′51″E		
Ufudaki 大岳; Ufudaki	Taketomi	Kohama Island; site of one of the Sakishima Beacons		24°20′49″N 123°58′43″E		

== Registered Places of Scenic Beauty ==
As of 27 December 2025, seven Monuments have been registered (as opposed to designated) as Places of Scenic Beauty at a national level.

Place	Municipality	Comments	Image	Coordinates	Type	Ref.
Cape Ugan 御神崎; Ugan-zaki	Ishigaki			24°20′22″N 124°09′14″E		
Former Nakasone Family Gardens 旧仲宗根氏庭園 kyū-Nakasone-shi teien	Miyakojima			24°48′21″N 125°16′50″E		
Tsukayama Brewery Gardens 津嘉山酒造所庭園; Tsukayama shuzōsho teien	Nago			26°35′29″N 127°59′00″E		
Nakamoto Family Gardens 仲本氏庭園; Nakamoto-shi teien	Ishigaki			24°20′07″N 124°08′52″E		
Hananda (Natural Bridge) ハナンダー（自然橋） Hananda (shizen-bashi)	Yaese			26°07′14″N 127°44′38″E		
Southeast Botanical Gardens 東南植物楽園; Tōnan shokubutsu rakuen	Okinawa			26°22′24″N 127°48′22″E		
Kin Limestone Cave (Nisshū-dō) 金武鍾乳洞(日秀洞); Kin shōnyū-dō (Nisshū-dō)	Kin			26°27′19″N 127°55′17″E		

== See also ==
- Cultural Properties of Japan
- List of Historic Sites of Japan (Okinawa)
- List of parks and gardens of Okinawa Prefecture
- List of Natural Monuments of Japan (Okinawa)
