= Irabu Prefectural Natural Park =

Prefectural Natural Park in Okinawa Prefecture, Japan

- 伊良部県立自然公園
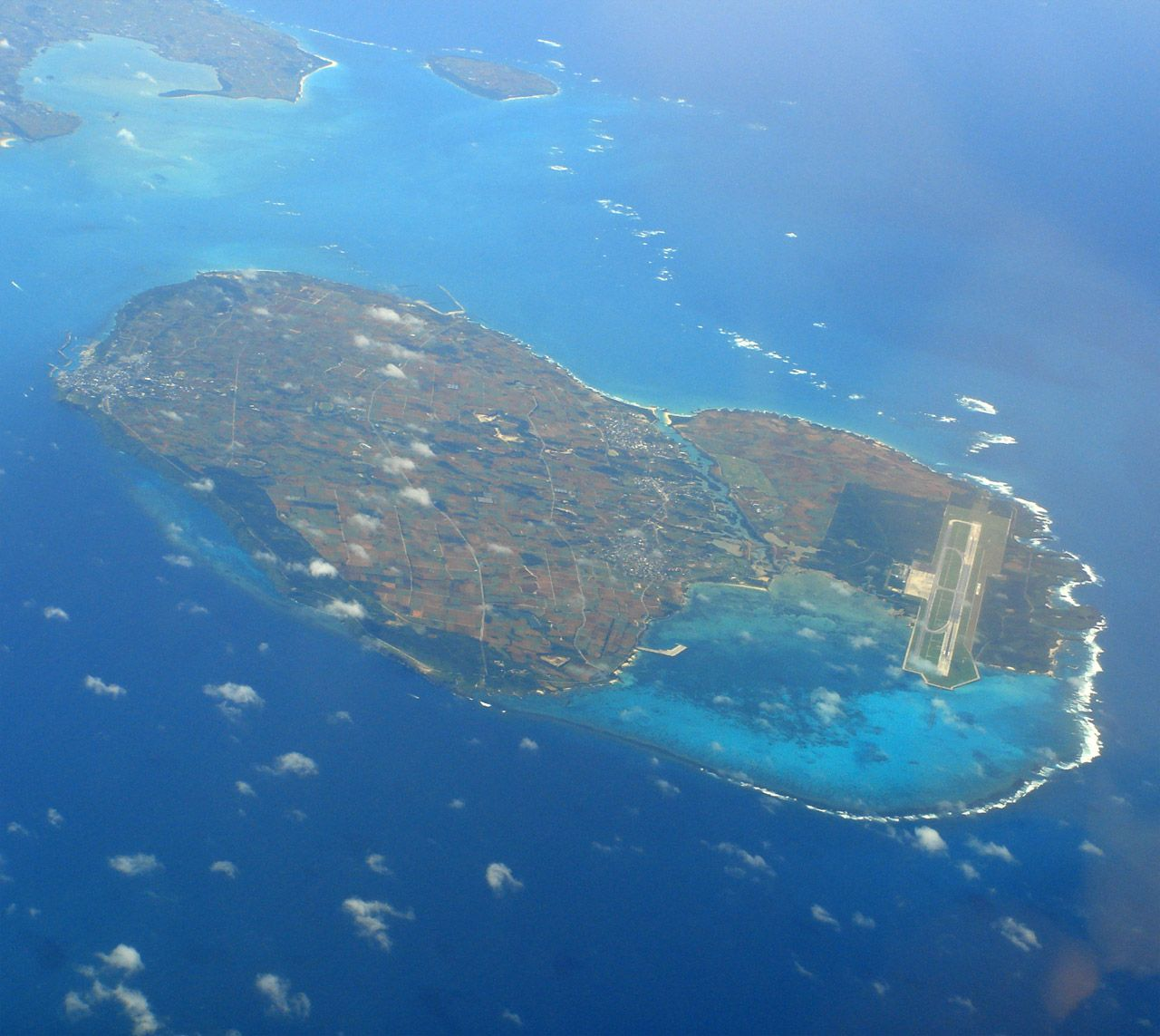
- Irabu and Shimojishima

- Location within Okinawa Prefecture Location within Japan
- Location: Okinawa Prefecture, Japan
- Coordinates: 24.83°N 125.17°E
- Area: 57.39 km^{2} (22.16 sq mi)
- Established: 1 September 1995

Irabu Prefectural Natural Park (伊良部県立自然公園, Irabu kenritsu shizen kōen) is a Prefectural Natural Park on and around the islands of Irabu and Shimojishima, Okinawa Prefecture, Japan. The islands, part of the Miyako island group, are adjacent but divided by a narrow channel. The park was established in 1995 and includes a designated marine zone of 23 km^{2}.

== See also ==
- National Parks of Japan
- Iriomote-Ishigaki National Park
- Okinawa Kaigan Quasi-National Park
- Kumejima Prefectural Natural Park
