= Tatami-ishi =

Geological feature in Okinawa, Japan

Coordinates: 26°20′10″N 126°49′27″E

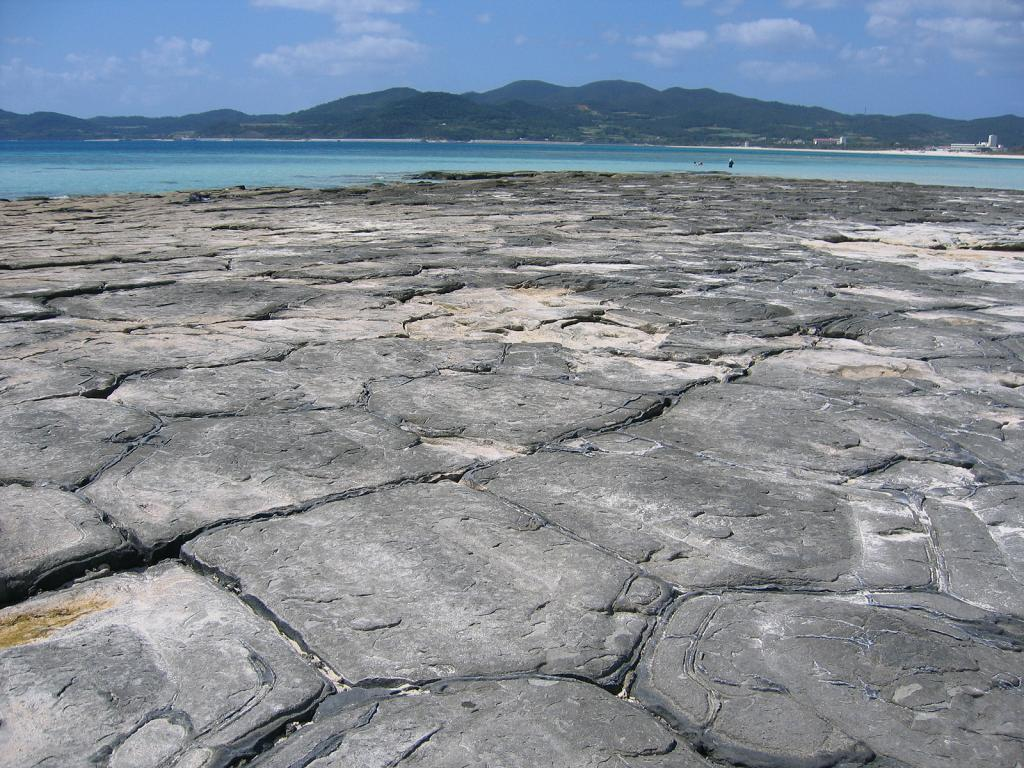
Tatami-ishi in Kumejima, Okinawa Prefecture

Tatami-ishi (畳石, Tatami-ishi), literally "tatami stones", is a geological feature in Kumejima, Okinawa, Japan. Located on the south coast of the island of Ōjima (奥武島), to the immediate southeast of Kume Island, it lies within Kumejima Prefectural Natural Park. Exposed at low tide, the feature comprises some one thousand pentagonal and hexagonal rocks, each 1 to 1.5 metres in diameter, stretching fifty metres from north to south over a length of two hundred and fifty metres. It was formed during the Miocene period by the columnar jointing of andesitic lava as it cooled and contracted. The name is derived from the resemblance to a room of close-fitted tatami mats, while the feature is sometimes also likened to a turtle's carapace. In 1967 Tatami-ishi was designated a Natural Monument by the Government of the Ryukyu Islands. With the reversion of Okinawa to Japan in 1972, it was redesignated a Prefectural Cultural Property. In 2014 an area of 29.3 ha was designated a national Natural Monument.

== See also ==
- List of Natural Monuments of Japan (Okinawa)
- List of Places of Scenic Beauty of Japan (Okinawa)
- List of parks and gardens of Okinawa Prefecture
- Kumejima Museum
- List of places with columnar jointed volcanics
