= Irabu =

Irabu may refer to:

- Hideki Irabu, a Japanese baseball player
- Irabu Island, an island in Okinawa
- Okinoerabujima, an island in Kagoshima Prefecture, natively called Irabu
