= Mount Yonaha =

Tallest mountain in Okinawa, Japan

- 与那覇岳
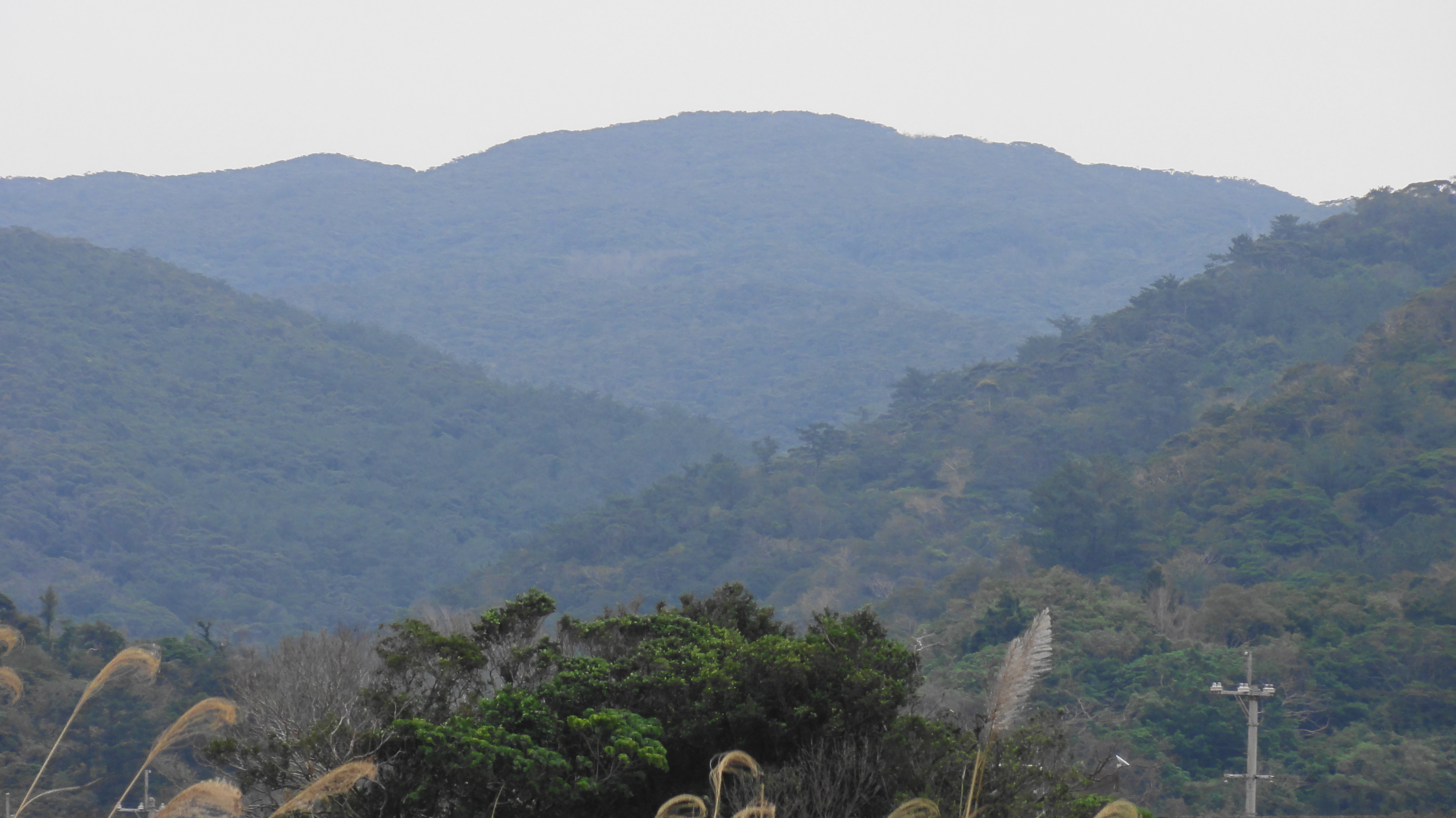
- Mount Yonaha

Highest point
- Elevation: 503 m (1,650 ft)
- Prominence: 503 m (1,650 ft)
- Coordinates: 26°43′1.2″N 128°13′7.2″E

Naming
- Language of name: Japanese
- Pronunciation: Japanese: [jonahadake]

Geography
- Location within Japan
- Location: Okinawa Prefecture

Climbing
- Easiest route: Hiking

Mount Yonaha (与那覇岳, Yonaha-dake; Okinawan: Yunafa-daki) is a mountain in Kunigami on the main island of Okinawa in Okinawa Prefecture. It has an elevation of 503 m (1,650 ft), but Yonaha-dake triangulation station is located at the next peak of elevation of 498 m (1,634 ft).

== Etymology ==
"Mount Yonaha" in the Japanese language is formed from three kanji, 与, 那 and 覇. The kanji are ateji, or kanji used phonetically to represent native or borrowed words.

== Geography ==
Mount Yonaha is approximately 80 km (50 mi) north of the capital of Okinawa Prefecture, Naha, and approximately 4.5 km (3 mi) east of the Okuma district (奥間集落, Okuma shūraku) of Kunigami. It is formed from schist, phyllite, and sandstone, and dates from the Tertiary period to the mid-Mesozoic era. It appears as a gentle slope, but its summit is surrounded by a series of complex valleys. It is the highest mountain on the island and the second highest in the prefecture after Mount Omoto 525.5 m (1,724 ft) in Ishigaki, Okinawa. It is part of the Okinawa Kaigan Quasi-National Park, and the highest mountain in the park. A paved road extends from the village of Kunigami at the mountain's base to its summit.

Mount Yonaha is home to the largest waterfall on Okinawa Island, the Hiji Waterfall (26 m (85 ft)). Due to the effect of the Kuroshio Current, the mountain is almost always covered in fog.

== Rivers ==
- Okuma River (奥間川, Okuma-gawa)
- Hiji River (比地川, Hiji-gawa)
- Toko River (床川, Toko-gawa)

== Yanbaru forest ==
Mount Yonaha is at the center of the Yanbaru forest that spans the villages of Higashi, Kunigami, and Ōgimi. Yanbaru contains some of the last large surviving tracts of subtropical rainforest in Asia, and the mountain is lush with evergreens forests. While Mount Yonaha is an important natural habitat to numerous species of plants, birds, and animals, its ecology has been negatively affected by agricultural development at its base, and lumbering and the subsequent establishment of second-growth forest.

== Military installation ==
Mount Yonaha's summit is approximately 2 km (1 mi) west of the border of Camp Gonsalves, a jungle warfare training center of the United States Marine Corps.
