= Kunigami District, Okinawa =

District in Okinawa prefecture, Japan

Coordinates: 26°38′30″N 128°07′48″E

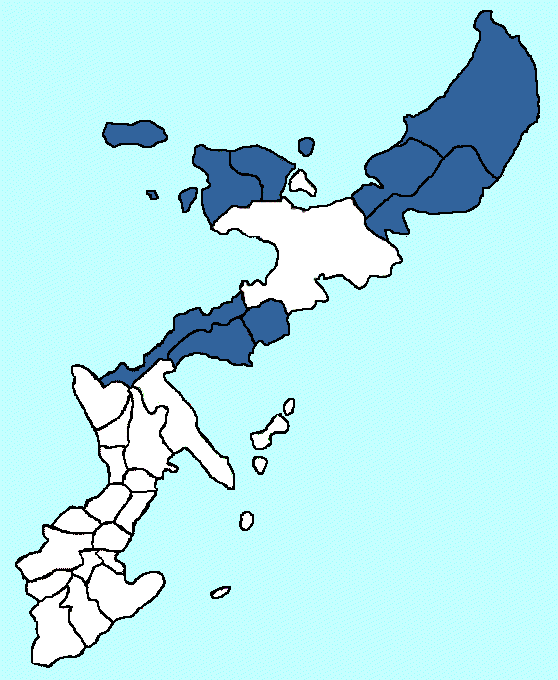
Kunigami District (in blue) in Okinawa Prefecture

Kunigami (国頭郡, Kunigami-gun; Kunigami: Kunzan, Okinawan: Kunjan) is a district located in Okinawa Prefecture, Japan. Roughly translated, kunigami means "head of the country", referring to its northern location on the island of Okinawa. Compare this to Shimajiri District, Okinawa.

As of 2020, the district has an estimated population of 62,257 and the density of 107.84 persons per km^{2}. The total area is 577.3 km^{2}.

Kunigami district includes a section of Okinawa Island and several smaller islands.

== Towns and villages ==
- Ginoza
- Higashi
- Ie
- Kin
- Kunigami
- Motobu
- Nakijin
- Ōgimi
- Onna

== Transportation ==
The portion of the district on Okinawa is served by Naha Airport in nearby Naha. Ie has the Iejima Airport.

== Education ==
The individual towns and villages operate their public elementary and junior high schools.

Okinawa Prefectural Board of Education operates the following public high schools in the district:

- Ginoza High School (Ginoza)
- Hentona High School (Ogimi)
- Hokuzan High School (Nakijin)
- Motobu High School (Motobu)
