= Tarama Airport =

Tarama Airport 多良間空港
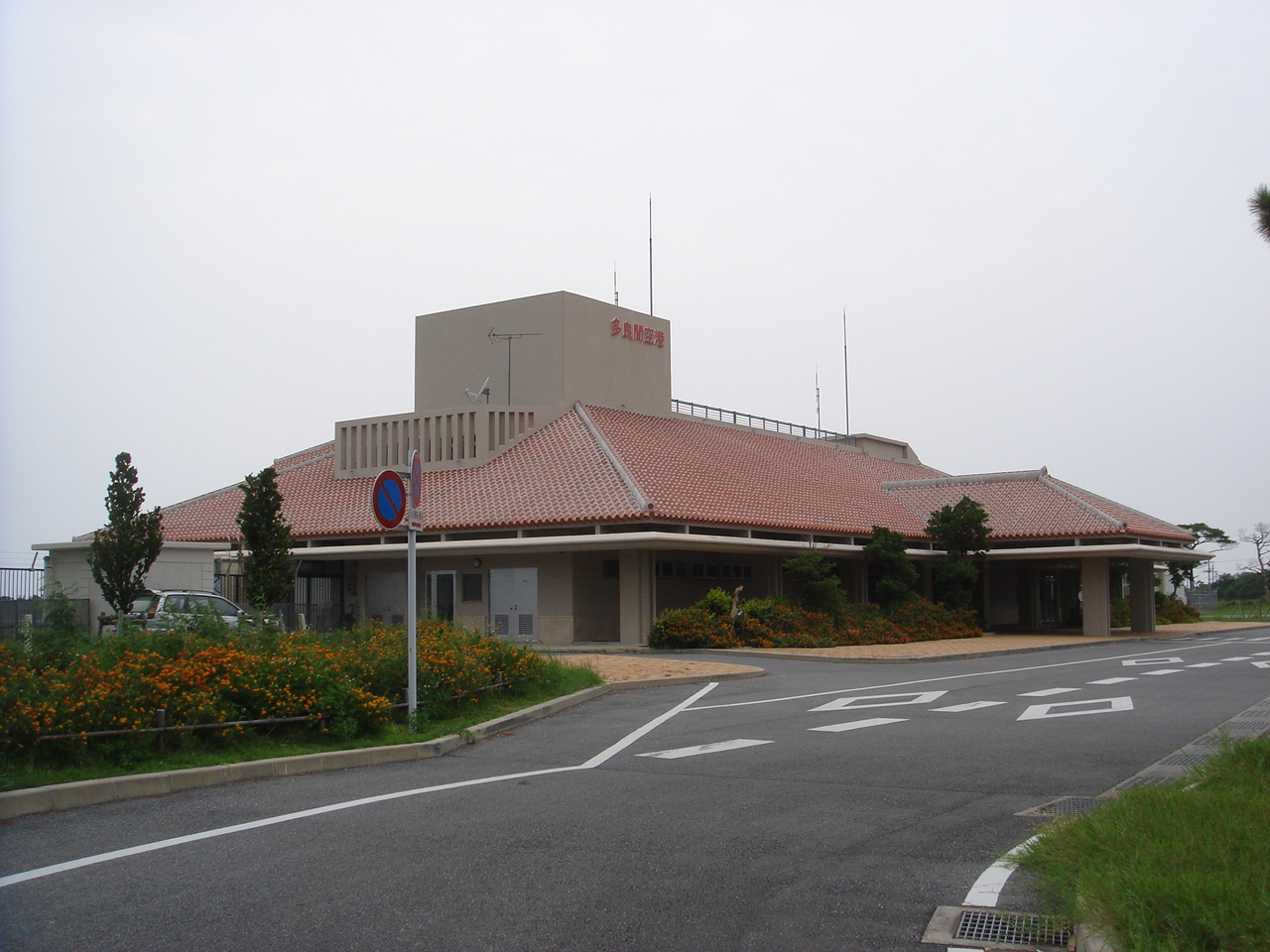
- IATA: TRA; ICAO: RORT

Summary
- Airport type: Public
- Operator: Okinawa Prefecture
- Location: Tarama, Okinawa, Japan
- Elevation AMSL: 34 ft (10 m)
- Coordinates: 24°39′14″N 124°40′31″E

Map
- Location in Japan RORT (Japan)

Runways
Direction	Length		Surface
Direction	m	ft	Surface
18/36	1,500	4,921	Asphalt concrete

Statistics (2015)
- Passengers: 36,593
- Cargo (metric tonnes): 269
- Aircraft movement: 1,466
- Source: Japanese Ministry of Land, Infrastructure, Transport and Tourism

Tarama Airport (多良間空港, Tarama Kūkō; (IATA: TRA, ICAO: RORT)) is located in Tarama, Miyako District, Okinawa Prefecture, Japan.

The airport is operated by the prefecture, and is classified as a third-class airport.

== Airlines and destinations ==
Airlines	Destinations
Ryukyu Air Commuter	Miyako
