= Miyako Islands =

Archipelago within the Ryukyu Islands

Coordinates: 24°43′N 125°01′E

Native name: Miyako-rettō (宮古列島)
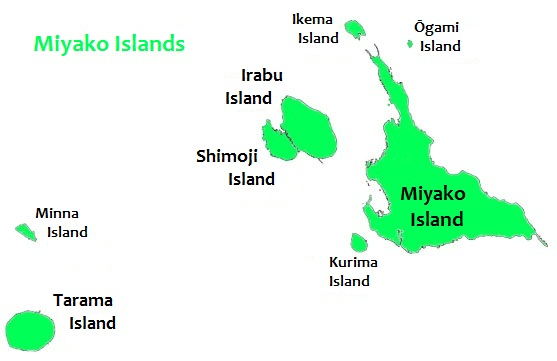
- Map of the Miyako Islands

- Location of Miyako Islands within Okinawa Predecture Location of Miyako Islands within the East China Sea

Geography
- Location: Pacific Ocean
- Archipelago: Sakishima Islands
- Adjacent to: East China Sea
- Total islands: 12
- Major islands: Miyako Island, Irabu Island, Tarama Island
- Area: 226.20 km^{2} (87.34 sq mi)

Administration
- Japan
- Prefecture: Okinawa Prefecture

Demographics
- Population: 55,522 (January 2018)
- Pop. density: 246.2/km^{2} (637.7/sq mi)
- Ethnic groups: Ryukyuan, Japanese

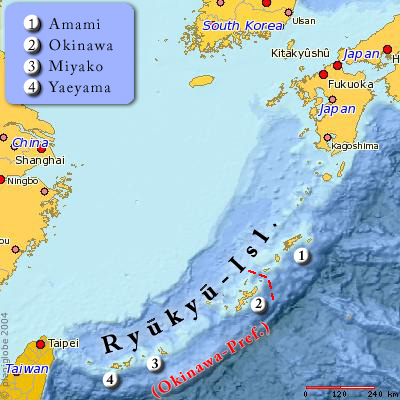
Location of the Miyako Islands

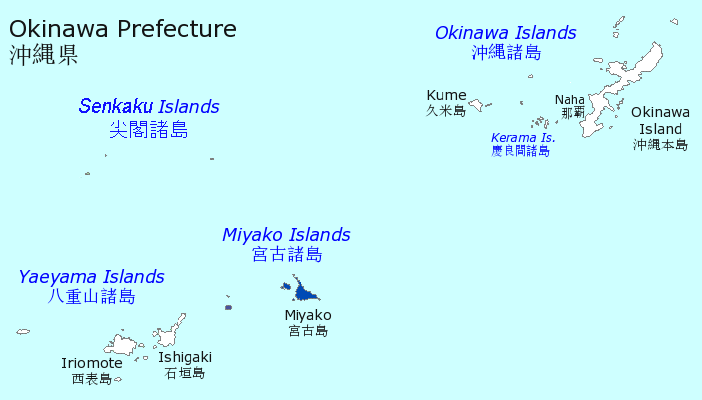
Location of the Miyako Islands in Okinawa Prefecture

The Miyako Islands (宮古列島, Miyako-rettō; Miyako: Myaaku, Tarama dialect: Meeku, Okinawan: Naaku, Northern Ryukyuan: みやこ Miyako) (also Miyako Jima group) are a group of islands in Okinawa Prefecture, Japan, belonging to the Ryukyu Islands. They are situated between Okinawa Island and the Yaeyama Islands.

In the early 1870s, the population of the islands was estimated to number approximately 10,000. Miyako Island has 55,914 people. A bridge connects Miyako Island to Ikema Island, which has 801 people. Tarama village has 1,214 people, between the two islands of Minna and Tarama.

== Important Bird Area ==
The islands have been recognised as an Important Bird Area (IBA) by BirdLife International because they support populations of the resident Ryukyu green pigeons, as well as migrating whimbrels.

== Inhabited islands ==
- Miyakojima City
  - Ikema Island (池間島, Ikema-jima; Miyako: Ikyaama)
  - Irabu Island (伊良部島, Irabu-jima; Miyako: Irav)
  - Kurima Island (来間島, Kurima-jima; Miyako: Ffyama)
  - Miyako Island (宮古島, Miyako-jima; Miyako: Myaaku, Okinawan: Naaku)
  - Ōgami Island (大神島, Ōgami-jima) (ja)
  - Shimoji Island (下地島, Shimoji-shima; Miyako: Sïmuzï)
- Tarama Village (Miyako District)
  - Minna Island (水納島, Minna-jima; Miyako: Minna)
  - Tarama Island (多良間島, Tarama-jima; Miyako and Okinawan: Tarama) (ja)

== See also ==
- Ryukyuan people
- Sakishima Islands
- Miyakoan language
- Miyako Strait
