= Okinawa Yanbaru Seawater Pumped Storage Power Station =

Experimental hydroelectric power station in Okinawa Prefecture, Japan

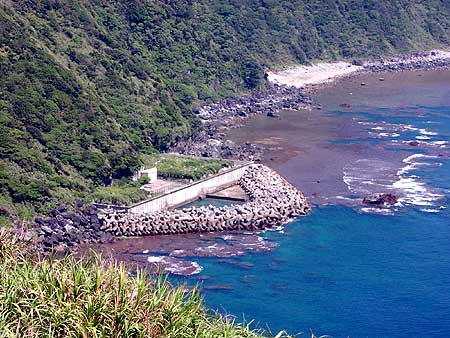
- The seawater intake/outlet faced the Pacific Ocean, which served as the lower reservoir for this power station. The upper reservoir is not shown in this picture.
- Interactive map of Okinawa Yanbaru Seawater Pumped Storage Power Station
- Country: Japan
- Location: Kunigami, Okinawa
- Coordinates: 26°40′25″N 128°15′56″E
- Status: Dismantled
- Opening date: May 16, 1999
- Demolition date: 2016
- Operator: Electric Power Development Company

Upper reservoir
- Total capacity: 564,000 m^{3} (457 acre⋅ft)

Lower reservoir
- Creates: Pacific Ocean

Power Station
- Installed capacity: 30 MW (40,000 hp)

The Okinawa Yanbaru Seawater Pumped Storage Power Station (沖縄やんばる海水揚水発電所, Okinawa Yanbaru Kaisui Yōsui Hatsudensho) was an experimental hydroelectric power station located in Kunigami, Okinawa, Japan and operated by the Electric Power Development Company. It was the world’s first pumped-storage facility to use seawater for storing energy. Its maximum output was 30 MW. Construction of the plant started in 1987 and was completed in 1999 at a cost of ¥3.2 billion. It was dismantled in 2016.

== Facility ==
The power station was a pure pumped-storage facility, using the Pacific Ocean as its lower reservoir, with an effective drop of 136 m and maximum flow of 26 m^{3}/s. Its pipelines and pump turbine were installed underground. Its maximum output was approximately 2.1% of the maximum power demand in the Okinawa Island recorded on August 3, 2009.

The upper reservoir, artificially excavated, was approximately 600 metres (2,000 ft) away from the shoreline and approximately 150 metres (490 ft) above sea level. It had an octagonal planar shape with a maximum width of 252 metres (827 ft). Its maximum depth was 25 metres (82 ft) and its effective storage capacity was 564,000 cubic metres (457 acre⋅ft). The entire inner surface of the reservoir was covered with an impermeable liner to prevent seawater from leaking and damaging the surrounding vegetation.

Fiber-reinforced plastic tubes were adopted for the penstock and the tailrace instead of steel tubes in order to avoid seawater corrosion and adhesion of barnacles. The pump turbine was partially made of stainless steel resistant to seawater.

A 66 kV line connected the power station with the power grid of The Okinawa Electric Power Company.

== History ==
The power station was a pilot plant funded by the Agency for Natural Resources and Energy and constructed by the Electric Power Development Company. A five-year verification operation was conducted beginning on May 16, 1999. The Japan Society of Civil Engineers presented the company an Outstanding Civil Engineering Achievement Award on May 26, 2000 for its construction of the plant.

The operator could not put the power station into practical use because the demand for electric power in Okinawa had not grown as predicted, and the plant was not profitable as a business. The power plant was dismantled in July 2016.

== See also ==
- Pumped-storage hydroelectricity
