= Kunigami, Okinawa =

Village in Okinawa, Japan

Kunigami 国頭村 Kunzan, Kunjan
- Village
- Kunigami Village
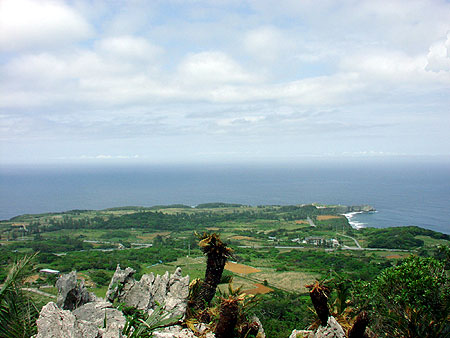
- View of Cape Hedo

- Flag Seal

- Location of Kunigami in Okinawa Prefecture

- Coordinates: 26°44′45″N 128°10′41″E
- Country: Japan
- Region: Kyushu
- Prefecture: Okinawa Prefecture
- Established: 1 April 1908

Area
  - Total: 194.80 km^{2} (75.21 sq mi)

Population (2015)
  - Total: 4,908
  - Density: 25/km^{2} (65/sq mi)
- Time zone: UTC+9 (Japan Standard Time)
  - Tree: Castanopsis sieboldii
  - Flowering tree: Schima wallichii
  - Flower: Rhododendron tashiroi
  - Bird: Okinawa rail
  - Fish: Green humphead parrotfish
- Climate: Cfa
- Website: www.vill.kunigami.okinawa.jp

Kunigami (Japanese: 国頭村, Hepburn: Kunigami-son; Kunigami: Kunzan; Okinawan: Kunjan) is a village in Kunigami District, Okinawa Prefecture, Japan. It occupies the north tip of Okinawa Island, with the East China Sea to the west, Pacific Ocean to the east, and villages of Higashi and Ōgimi to the south.

As of 2015, the village has a population of 4,908 and a population density of 25.20 persons per km^{2}. The total area is 194.80 km^{2}.

== History ==
According to Chūzan Seikan, the goddess Amamikyu consecrated the first utaki in Asa Forest at Hedo, in what is now Kunigami; the forest is also mentioned in Omoro Sōshi. Ceramics from the Jōmon-period Uzahama Site (宇佐浜遺跡) resemble those found in the Amami Islands. Chūzan Seikan records the prayers of the Kunigami council for the recovery of Shō Sei after an abortive attempt to occupy Amami Ōshima in 1537, while Kyūyō recounts the appointment of the son of the Kunigami Oyakata as aji after the successful takeover of the Amami Islands by Shō Gen in 1571.

Kunigami District was established in 1896 and, upon the abolition of Kunigami magiri, Kunigami Village was founded in 1908. During the Battle of Okinawa, the area saw an influx of refugees fleeing the heavy fighting in the south. In September 1945, the occupying government merged the three villages of Kunigami, Higashi, and Ōgimi into the new city of Hentona (辺土名市); the merger was reversed the following year.

== Geography ==
Kunigami is mountainous, with over 80% of the land area covered by subtropical evergreen forest. Endemic species include the Okinawa woodpecker and Okinawa rail.

- Mount Yonaha (503 m), the highest mountain on Okinawa Island
- Mount Nishime (西銘岳) (420 m)
- Mount Terukubi (照首山) (395 m)
- Aha River (安波川)
- Benoki River (辺野喜川)
- Adaka Island (安田ヶ島)
- Cape Hedo
- Kayauchibanta Shell Mound (カヤウチバンタ貝塚)
- Camp Gonsalves
- Yanbaru National Park

=== Administrative divisions ===
The village includes twenty-one wards.

- Ada (安田)
- Aha (安波)
- Benoki (辺野喜)
- Gaji (我地)
- Ginama (宜名真)
- Hama (浜)
- Hanji (半地)
- Hedo (辺戸)
- Hentona (辺土名)
- Hiji (比地)
- Iji (伊地)
- Jashiki (謝敷)
- Kaganji (鏡地)
- Oku (奥)
- Okuma (奥間)
- Sate (佐手)
- Sosu (楚洲)
- Tōbaru (桃原)
- Uka (宇嘉)
- Ura (宇良)
- Yona (与那)

=== Neighbouring municipalities ===
- Higashi
- Ōgimi

=== Climate ===
Climate data for Kunigami (1991–2020 normals, extremes 1977–present)
Month	Jan	Feb	Mar	Apr	May	Jun	Jul	Aug	Sep	Oct	Nov	Dec	Year
Record high °C (°F)	25.3 (77.5)	25.9 (78.6)	28.5 (83.3)	28.9 (84.0)	31.0 (87.8)	33.2 (91.8)	34.2 (93.6)	33.8 (92.8)	33.6 (92.5)	32.1 (89.8)	28.4 (83.1)	26.6 (79.9)	34.2 (93.6)
Mean daily maximum °C (°F)	17.4 (63.3)	17.9 (64.2)	19.8 (67.6)	22.3 (72.1)	25.1 (77.2)	28.3 (82.9)	30.5 (86.9)	30.1 (86.2)	28.8 (83.8)	25.8 (78.4)	22.6 (72.7)	19.1 (66.4)	24.0 (75.1)
Daily mean °C (°F)	14.7 (58.5)	14.9 (58.8)	16.5 (61.7)	19.0 (66.2)	21.8 (71.2)	25.0 (77.0)	26.9 (80.4)	26.7 (80.1)	25.6 (78.1)	23.1 (73.6)	20.1 (68.2)	16.5 (61.7)	20.9 (69.6)
Mean daily minimum °C (°F)	12.7 (54.9)	12.7 (54.9)	14.1 (57.4)	16.5 (61.7)	19.5 (67.1)	22.9 (73.2)	24.7 (76.5)	24.7 (76.5)	23.6 (74.5)	21.3 (70.3)	18.2 (64.8)	14.6 (58.3)	18.8 (65.8)
Record low °C (°F)	3.1 (37.6)	4.8 (40.6)	5.2 (41.4)	10.8 (51.4)	12.6 (54.7)	15.7 (60.3)	19.8 (67.6)	20.3 (68.5)	17.7 (63.9)	15.1 (59.2)	11.1 (52.0)	7.2 (45.0)	3.1 (37.6)
Average precipitation mm (inches)	143.9 (5.67)	159.7 (6.29)	194.6 (7.66)	199.4 (7.85)	281.8 (11.09)	342.8 (13.50)	199.6 (7.86)	230.3 (9.07)	271.5 (10.69)	225.9 (8.89)	189.5 (7.46)	155.2 (6.11)	2,594.1 (102.13)
Average precipitation days (≥ 1.0 mm)	13.4	12.9	13.6	12.6	13.8	14.9	10.1	12.9	13.7	11.8	10.8	12.5	153
Mean monthly sunshine hours	77.6	82.8	113.0	126.9	145.0	170.7	245.1	218.6	167.5	130.2	94.0	79.8	1,651.1
Source: Japan Meteorological Agency

== Demographics ==
Census data
Year	Pop.	±%
1920	11,525	—
1925	10,112	−12.3%
1930	10,417	+3.0%
1935	10,460	+0.4%
1940	9,969	−4.7%
1950	12,000	+20.4%
1955	11,267	−6.1%
1960	10,653	−5.4%
1965	9,192	−13.7%
1970	7,324	−20.3%
1975	6,568	−10.3%
1980	6,873	+4.6%
1985	6,510	−5.3%
1990	6,114	−6.1%
1995	6,015	−1.6%
2000	5,825	−3.2%
2005	5,546	−4.8%
2010	5,118	−7.7%
2015	4,908	−4.1%
Source: Statistics Bureau

== Education ==
There is one municipal junior high school, Kunigami Junior High School (国頭中学校).

Kunigami has the following municipal elementary schools:

- Ada (安田小学校)
- Aha (安波小学校)
- Hentona (辺土名小学校)
- Oku (奥小学校)
- Okuma (奥間小学校)

The following municipal elementary schools are permanently closed:

- Kitaguni Elementary School (北国小学校)
- Sate Elementary School (佐手小学校)

There is one municipal kindergarten, Kunigami Nursery School (くにがみこども園).

== Cultural Properties ==
- Name (Japanese) (Type of registration)

=== Cultural Properties ===
- King Gihon's Tomb (義本王の墓) (Municipal)
- Uzahama Site (宇佐浜遺跡) (Municipal)

=== Natural Monuments ===
- Ada northern yellow boxwood forest reserve (安田のアカテツ保安林) (Municipal)
- Aha looking-glass mangrove trees Heritiera littoralis (安波のサキシマスオウノキ) (Prefectural)
- Aha Tanagā-gumui plant community (安波のタナガーグムイの植物群落) (National)
- Hiji Kodama-mui plant community (比地の小玉森の植物群落) (Prefectural)
- Mount Yonaha Natural Protected Area (与那覇岳天然保護区域) (National)

== Sister cities ==
- ― Yoron, Japan, since November 21, 2022
- ― Iwami, Japan, since July 16, 2023

== See also ==
- Kunigami language
- Okinawa Yanbaru Seawater Pumped Storage Power Station
- Yanbaru
