= Higashi, Okinawa =

Higashi 東村 Agarijima
- Village
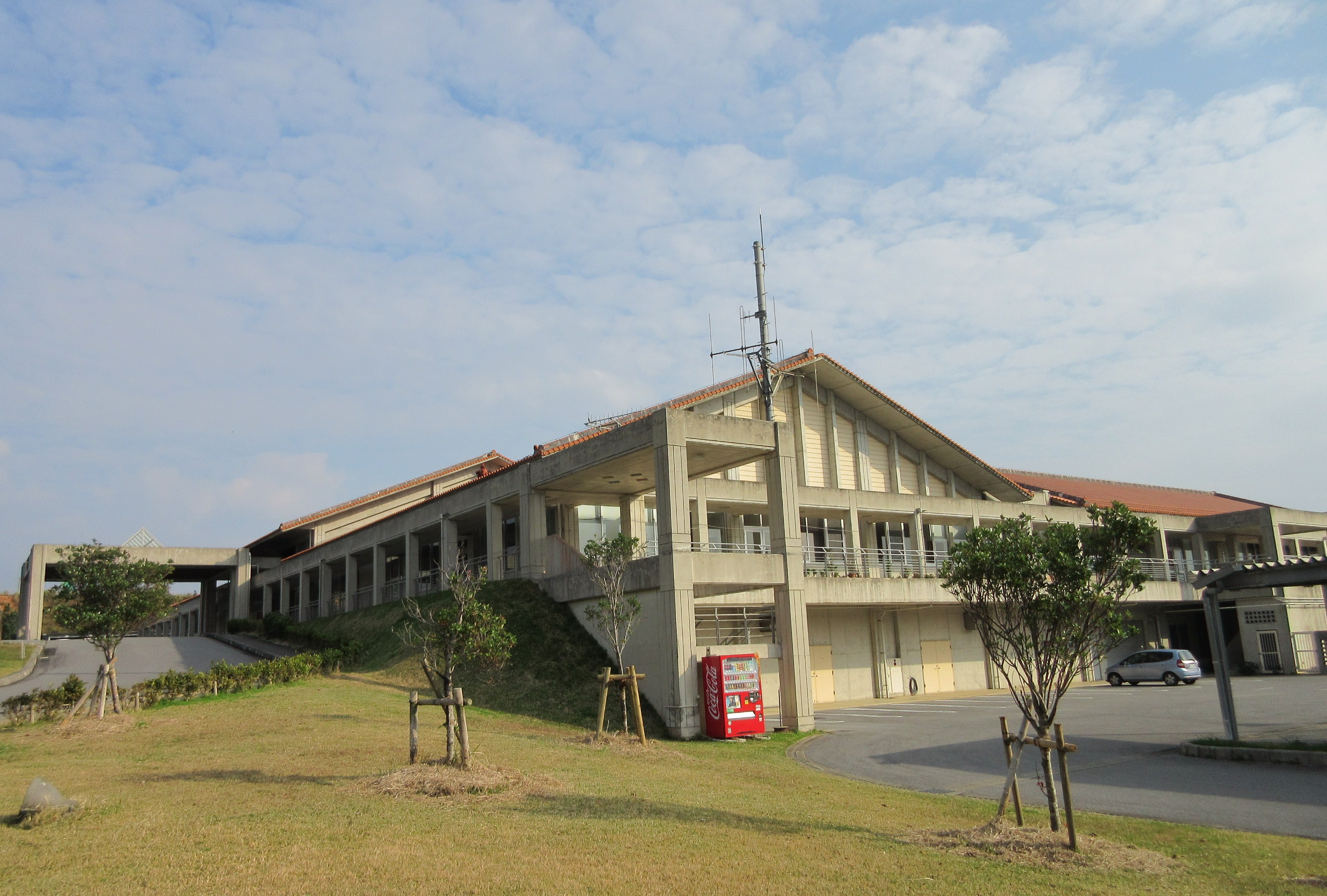
- Higashi Village Office

- Flag Emblem

- Location of Higashi in Okinawa Prefecture

- Location in Japan
- Coordinates: 26°38′0″N 128°9′25″E
- Country: Japan
- Region: Kyushu
- Prefecture: Okinawa Prefecture
- District: Kunigami

Area
  - Total: 81.79 km^{2} (31.58 sq mi)

Population (October 1, 2016)
  - Total: 1,683
  - Density: 20.58/km^{2} (53.29/sq mi)
- Time zone: UTC+09:00 (JST)
- Website: www.vill.higashi.okinawa.jp

Higashi (東村, Higashi-son; Kunigami: Agaarijimaa, Okinawan: Agarijima) is a village located in Kunigami District, Okinawa Prefecture, Japan.

As of 2016, the village has an estimated population of 1,683 and a population density of 21 persons per km^{2}. The total area is 81.79 km^{2}.

== Geography ==
=== Administrative divisions ===
The village includes six wards.

- Arume (有銘)
- Gesashi (慶佐次)
- Kawata (川田)
- Miyagi (宮城)
- Taira (平良)
- Takae (高江)

=== Neighbouring municipalities ===
- Nago
- Kunigami
- Ōgimi

== Ecotourism ==
The village of Higashi is one of the most remote places on Okinawa island and has become a hotspot of ecotourism. Okinawa's first ecotourism association was established in Higashi in 1998, with various associations eventually combined in 2005 to become the Higashi Village Tourism Promotion Association. One major project was the building of a ten-hectare mangrove forest called Hirugi Park, built around Gesashi Bay, the largest such forest on the island. The mangroves had been designated as a natural Monument of Japan in 1972 and were eventually incorporated into Yambaru National Park in 2016.

== Cultural Properties ==
- Name (Japanese) (Type of registration)

=== Natural Monuments ===
- Gesashi Bay mangrove forest (慶佐次湾のヒルギ林) (National)
- Large looking-glass mangrove tree Heritiera littoralis (サキシマスオウノキ) (Municipal)
- Large magnolia tree Magnolia compressa (オガタマノキ) (Municipal)

== Education ==
Schools are: Higashi Combined Kindergarten, Elementary, and Junior High School (東幼小中学校), Arume Kindergarten and Elementary School (有銘幼小学校), and Takae Elementary School (高江小学校).

== Notable residents ==
- Ai Miyazato, golfer
- Yūsaku Miyazato, golfer

== See also ==
- Yambaru
