= Ryukyu dog =

Ryukyu Dog
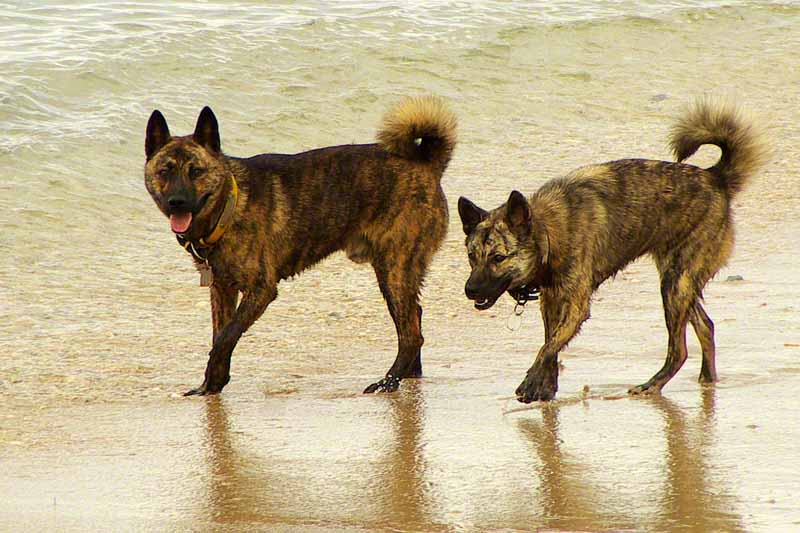
- Other names: Ryukyu Ken, Ryukyu Inu, Okinawa Native Dog, Tora Inu
- Origin: Okinawa, Japan
- Breed status: Not recognized as a breed by any major kennel club.
Traits
Height	Males	46.3–49.6 centimetres (18.2–19.5 in)
	Females	43.4–46.9 centimetres (17.1–18.5 in)
- Coat: short and long; single and double coated
- Color: red brindle (aka-tora), black brindle (kuro-tora), white brindle (shiro-tora), black (kuro), white (shiro), sesame (goma), ivory, liver and red (aka)

The Ryukyu dog (琉球犬; Ryūkyū-inu or Ryūkyū-ken) is an endangered, medium-sized, Japanese breed of dog indigenous to Okinawa and Ishigaki Island. There were as few as 400 Ryukyu as of 2015. Unlike dogs such as the Kai Ken, the Ryukyu dog is not protected by the Nihon Ken Hozonkai, but instead is protected by the Ryukyu Inu Hozonkai.

== History ==
The Ryukyu dog originated in Okinawa. The breed was originally used to track and bay Ryukyu wild boar in packs, and also rarely hunt birds. Much of the Ryukyu dog's history has been destroyed and misplaced, hence it is very sparse. The purebred Ryukyu dog was thought to be extinct after World War II due to food shortages and crossbreeding with Western dogs. In the early 1980s, Yoshio Aragaki, the founder of the Ryukyu dog Hozonkai, felt a strong urge to save the breed when he managed to find purebred Ryukyu dogs up in Yanbaru.

It is believed that years of living in the rainforest is why the Ryukyu dogs have a dewclaw on the back of the foot, allowing them to climb trees. It has been speculated that this would have been evolutionarily favourable to them because of the high incidence of tsunami in Okinawa; they could climb trees quickly to evade the floods. However, this is unlikely to be true as only a small percentage of Ryukyu dog actually have working rear dewclaws. The preservation society sees the dewclaws as a throwback from hundreds of years ago when the dogs were genetically closer to wolves, and that the claws are used more often to brake when running.

The Ryukyu dog was designated as a natural monument of Okinawa prefecture in 1995.

Several preservation activities take place for the Ryukyu dog in Japan. In Miyakojima, the NPO "Lavida" begun protecting the breed in 2010, and produced 15 puppies in 2017. Preservation activities also took place at Chubu Norin High School, where second year students were helping to preserve the purebred Ryukyu dog.

In 2013, Okinawa Children's Country opened an exhibit themed around the native animals of Ryukyu Arc, Ryukyu dogs were among the animals exhibited.

== Appearance ==
The Ryukyu dog is a medium-sized Okinawan dog breed. They are very similar to Kai Ken in appearance, but are genetically closer to the Hokkaido.

=== Breed standard ===
The Ryukyu dog is not currently recognised by any kennel club, including the Japanese Kennel Club; however the Ryukyu Ken Hozonkai has issued this breed standard for the Ryukyu dog.

- Temperament: Neither fearful nor aggressive, intelligent, alert, and quiet.
- Head and skull: Broad head; the muzzle is straight and drawn somewhat longer. The stop is shallow. Nose colour should always be black, with the exception of liver colouration, which always has a brown nose.
- Eyes: Clear, dark brown, the corner of the eye is not lifted. In liver the eye is golden/yellow.
- Ears: Pricked ears in a blunt triangle shape; dogs with ears that are dropped are undesirable.
- Mouth: Scissor bite. Undershot, overshot, or missing teeth are major faults. Black/blue pigment on tongue desirable.
- Neck: Moderately wide. Neither lean nor chunky.
- Forequarters: Forelegs straight.
- Body* Longer than high. The chest is well developed, wide and deep. Straight back.
- Hindquarters: Hindquarters straight and strong. Dewclaws at the back preferred.

Tail: The tail should ideally be in the shape of a blade, it can also be curled. Fault for a dropped tail.

- Coat: Short coat. Both single-coated and double-coated varieties allowed; long coat is a fault.
- Colour: There are four recognised colours for conformation: black brindle, red brindle, white brindle (both silver and cream brindle), red and liver. The brindle pattern has to be beautiful and clear. A small amount of white is permitted, but an excessive amount of white is a fault.
- Height: Males: 46.3 - 49.6cm; Females: 43.4 - 46.9cm

=== Colour and coat ===
The Ryukyu dog comes in nine colours: five original colours and four newer recognised colours. The original colours are:

- red (with and without a mask)
- liver
- white brindle
- black brindle
- red brindle

The newer official colours are:

- black
- white
- ivory
- sesame

Ryukyu dog are short-coated dogs that have both single-coated and double-coated variates. However, like Akita dogs, they do carry the long coat gene recessively.

== Temperament ==
The Ryukyu dog is described as a quiet dog that is capable of hunting in a group or on its own. They are agile, brave and not sensitive. They are natural hunters and have a high prey drive. Despite being a hunting dog, they are obedient, playful and good with children. They cannot be trusted around small animals but are usually okay with cats if introduced to them early on. They can be escape artists and have climbing abilities, especially those with working rear dewclaws, who can climb vertical trees. They are very smart and so require a lot of mental stimulation as well as physical stimulation.

Despite being bred, raised and used as a hunting dog for many years, they have been described by the Ryukyu dog Hozonkai as ideal for therapy dog work because of their calm, placid temperament when trained correctly; however, due to their high prey drive they are not suitable for disability assistance work.

== Lines ==
There are two distinct lines of Ryukyu dog, the Yanbaru and the Yaeyama. While they are the same breed of dog, there are subtle difference between the two lines. Ryukyu from the Yaeyama lines are often a lot bigger. For example, males from Yaeyama lines are often on average 49.6cm at the withers, whereas males from Yanbaru lines are on average 46.3cm. The Yaeyama line dogs also tend to have longer bodies and deeper chests than Yanbaru.

The Ryukyu dog Hozonkai has issued a statement that advises people to not breed Yabaru line dogs with Yaeyama line dogs at the current time as a preservation strategy.

== Ryukyu Inu Hozonkai ==
The Ryukyu Inu Hozonkai (Lit. Ryukyu dog Preservation Society) is the breed club for the Ryukyu dog. It was founded on 1 April 1990 by Yoshio Aragaki, and is the only Ryukyu dog breed club and the only establishment that recognises the Ryukyu dog thus far. The society has become inactive online in recent years, but the club itself is still active in and around Okinawa.

As of 1993, three years after the club's formation, there were 134 Ryukyu dogs registered. As a preservation and genetic diversity strategy, the club currently has open studbooks and registers dogs on merit if they meet the breed standard.

== Health ==
The Ryukyu dog, like all Japanese dog breeds, have relatively few health issues. The health conditions for Ryukyu dog aren't well-documented due to the culture of breeding dogs in Japan and Okinawa. Western breeders of Ryukyu dog are urged to test for hip dysplasia, elbow dysplasia, patella luxation, glaucoma, Collie eye anomaly (CEA) and hypothyroidism.

=== Inbreeding ===
One of the biggest health issues in Ryukyu dog is inbreeding. These dogs have already survived one near-extinction, and all current Ryukyu Ken are descendants of the small pack from the 1980s. At their peak, Ryukyu dog had around 1,500+ individuals in 2005, but this dropped to only 400 in 2015. Because of this second drop in population, finding two nearly completely unrelated individuals is very difficult, and as such risk of inbreeding is high. To combat this, the Ryukyu dog Hozonkai have begun registering dogs "on merit" if they meet the breed standard and still continue to do this.

== Notable Ryukyu ==
Kai (海) is a very well-known Ryukyu Ken in Okinawa who lives in Okinawa World. On 2 February 2019, Kai retired from life in the public eye after turning 16, to live in a quiet part of the workshop. He was replaced by a female Ryukyu called Sora.

Ume (ウメ) was a very light red brindle, almost fawn-coloured Ryukyu, that lived at the Okinawa Children's Zoo and Museum. Ume died on 29 August 2018 at the age of 13. Okinawa Zoo announced her death on 1 September on Facebook.

== See also ==
- List of dog breeds
- Daito Ken
