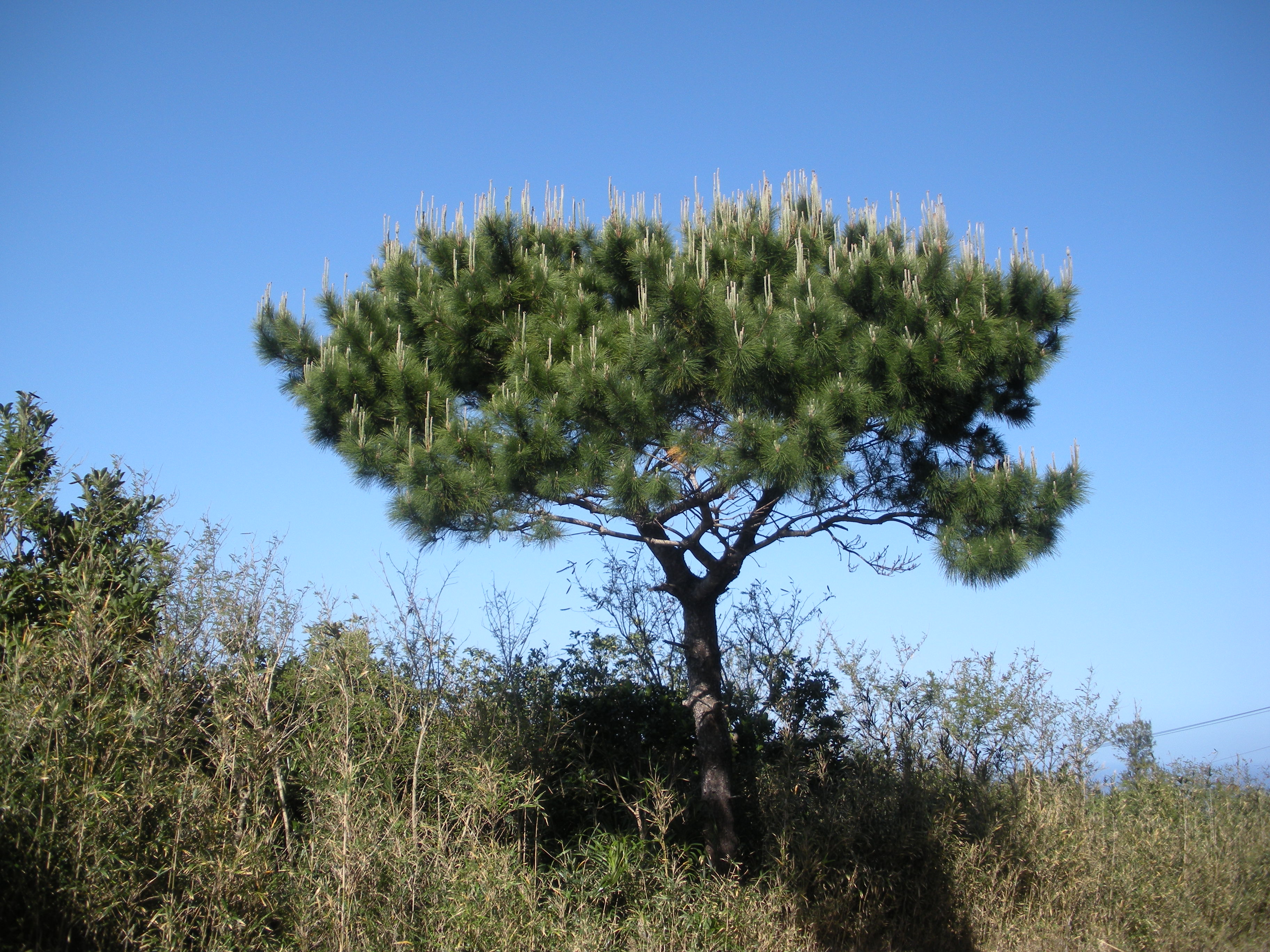
- A lone P. luchuensis, growing on Chichi-jima Island

Conservation status
- Least Concern (IUCN 3.1)

Scientific classification
- Kingdom: Plantae
- Clade: Tracheophytes
- Clade: Gymnosperms
- Division: Pinophyta
- Class: Pinopsida
- Order: Pinales
- Family: Pinaceae
- Genus: Pinus
- Subgenus: P. subg. Pinus
- Section: P. sect. Pinus
- Subsection: P. subsect. Pinus
- Species: P. luchuensis

Binomial name
- Pinus luchuensis Mayr

Synonyms
- Pinus luchuensis subsp. hwangshanensis (W.Y.Hsia) D.Z.Li; P. l. var. hwangshanensis (W.Y.Hsia) C.L.Wu; P. l. var. shenkanensis Silba; P. l. subsp. taiwanensis (Hayata) D.Z.Li

= Pinus luchuensis =

Species of conifer

Pinus luchuensis, the Luchu pine, Ryukyu pine, or Okinawa pine, is a species of conifer in the family Pinaceae endemic to, and locally abundant in the Ryukyu Islands of Japan. It was once threatened by habitat loss in the wild, where it can be found growing in small stands near windy ocean shores. Having been harvested widely since the Second World War, the remaining stands are no longer commercially viable, except when cultivated for ornamental use.
