= Miyara River =

River in Okinawa Prefecture, Japan

Coordinates: 24°21′19″N 124°12′51″E

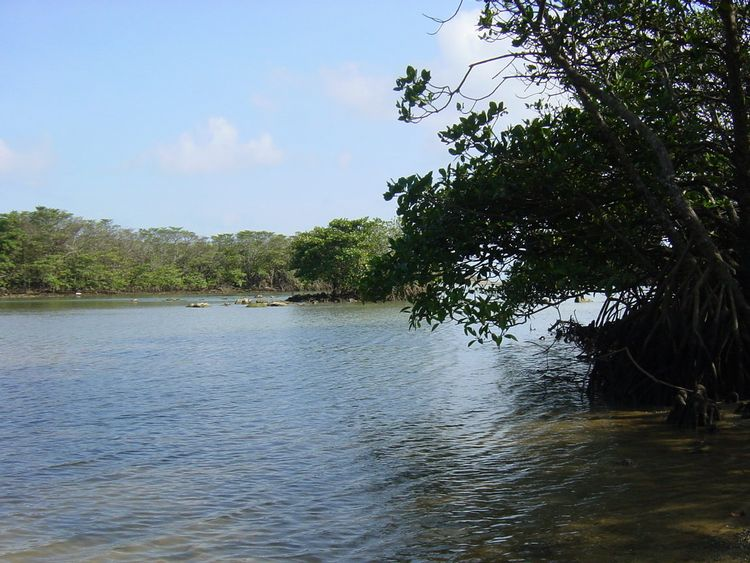

- Location within Japan

Miyara River (宮良川, Yaeyama: Mēra-kāra,Japanese: Miyara-gawa) is the biggest natural fresh water river of Ishigaki Island located in Okinawa Prefecture of Japan. The river is popular for the mangroves forest on both its banks which houses various wild birds and butterflies.
