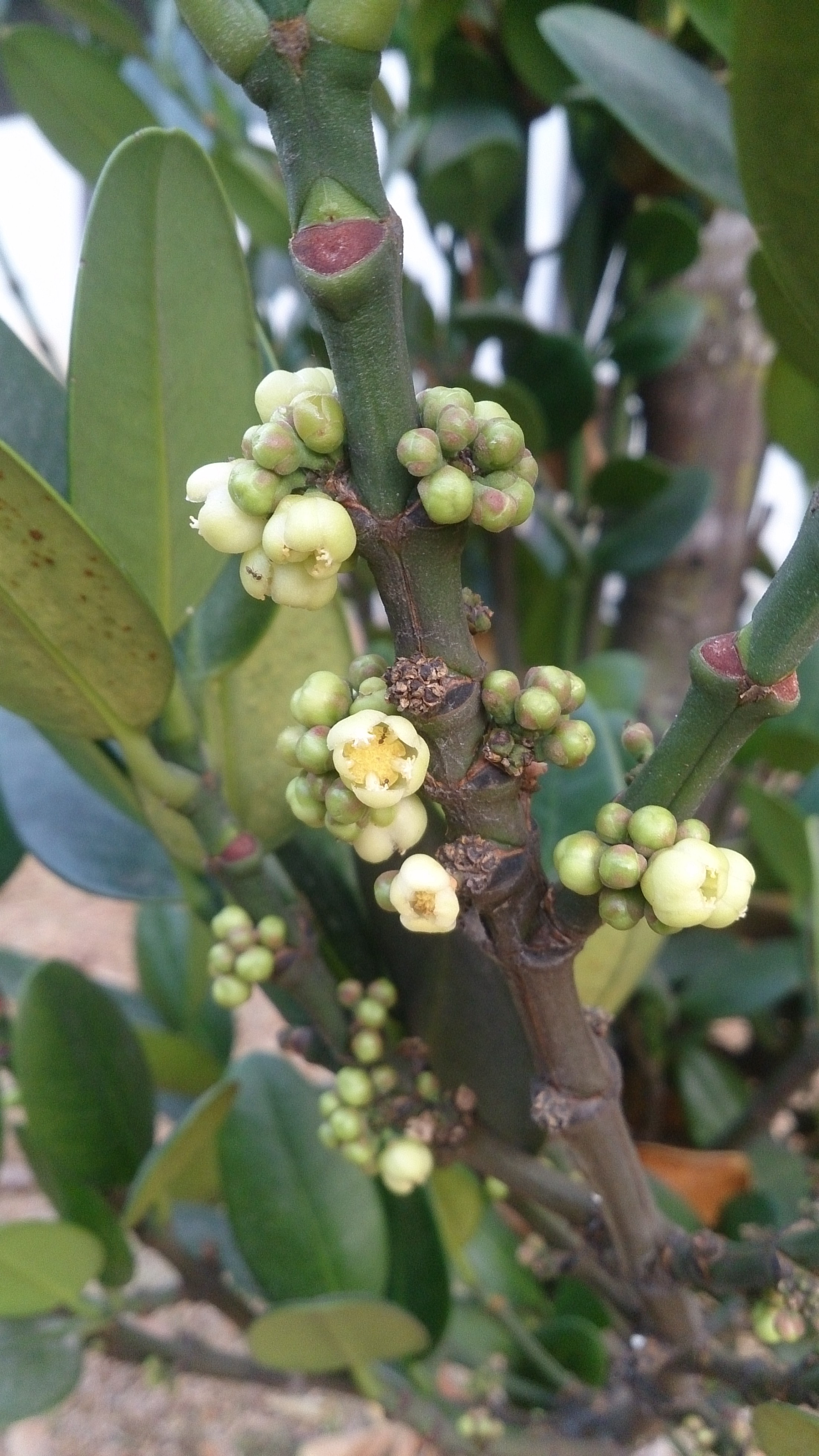

Conservation status
- Least Concern (IUCN 3.1)

Scientific classification
- Kingdom: Plantae
- Clade: Tracheophytes
- Clade: Angiosperms
- Clade: Eudicots
- Clade: Rosids
- Order: Malpighiales
- Family: Clusiaceae
- Genus: Garcinia
- Species: G. subelliptica

Binomial name
- Garcinia subelliptica Merr. (1908)

= Garcinia subelliptica =

Species of flowering plant

Garcinia subelliptica, commonly known as the happiness or Fukugi tree, is an evergreen shrub or tree found in coastal subtropical and tropical moist forests of East and Southeast Asia, specifically the Ryukyu Islands of Japan, Taiwan, the Philippines, and Java.

Trees are 6–20 meters high with ovate-oblong or elliptical thick leathery leaves. Fruits are smooth and yellow with 1-4 seeds.

The tree is widely planted in the Ryukyu Islands as a windbreak and ornamental, and the bark is a traditional dye. It is the floral emblem for the towns of Motobu and Tarama.

The species was described by Elmer Drew Merrill in 1908.
