= Shimoji-shima =

Island within Ryukyu Islands

Shimoji Island
Native name: Sumudzu-sima
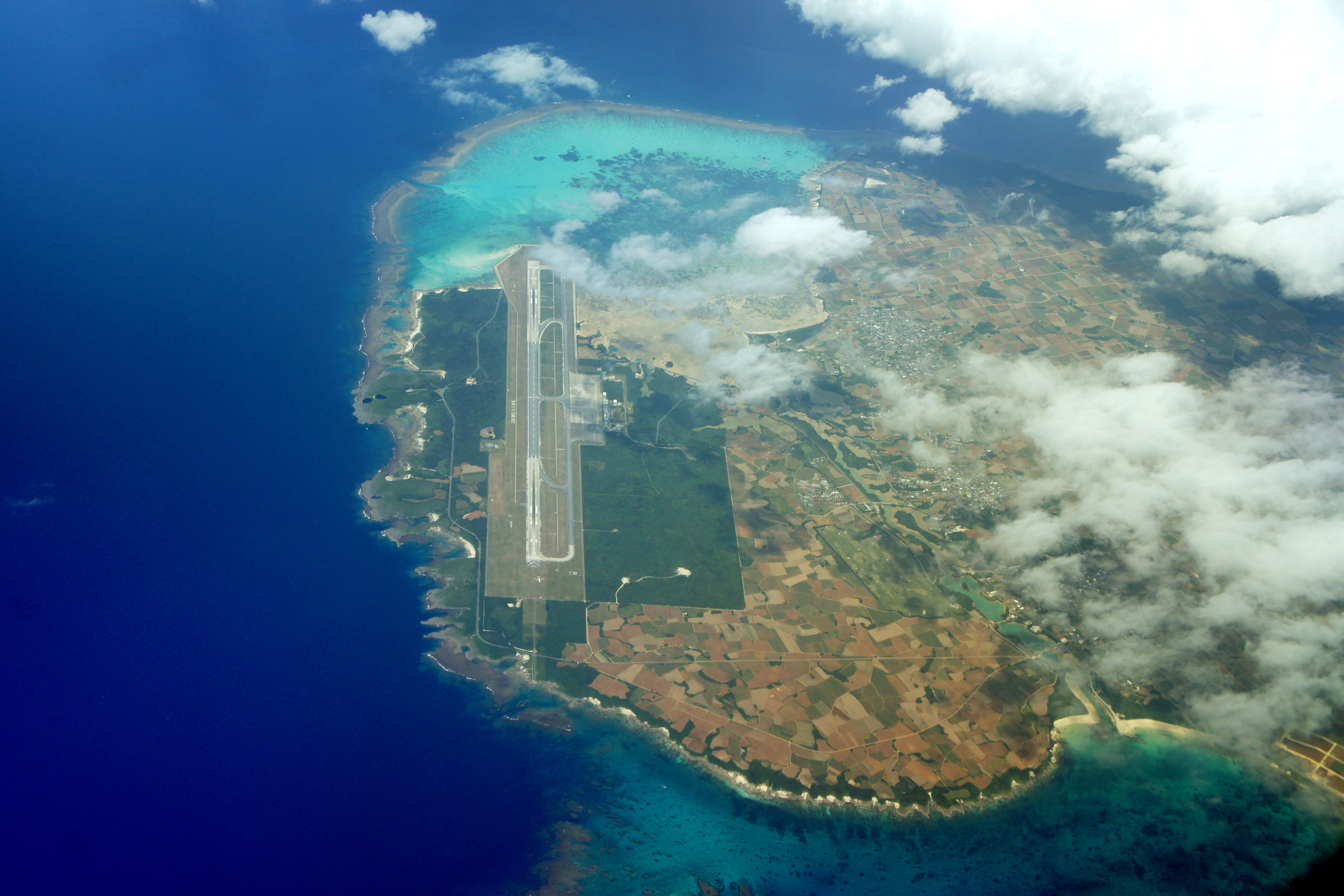
- Shimoji Island seen from the South.
- Interactive map of Shimoji Island

Geography
- Location: Okinawa Prefecture
- Coordinates: 24°48′58″N 125°9′25″E
- Archipelago: Miyako Islands
- Area: 9.68 km^{2} (3.74 sq mi)
- Highest elevation: 21.6 m (70.9 ft)

Administration
- Japan
- Prefecture: Okinawa Prefecture

Demographics
- Population: 76 (2015 national census)
- Ethnic groups: Ryukyuan, Japanese

Shimoji Island (下地島; Miyako: Sumudzu-sima, Japanese: Shimojishima) is one of the Miyako Islands, a part of the Ryukyu Islands. The island is administered by Miyakojima, Okinawa Prefecture, Japan. The island is connected to Irabu Island via Nakaji Bridge (仲地橋).

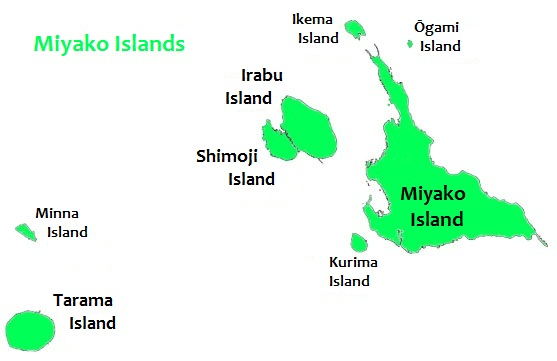
Shimoji Island is to the west of Miyako Island

Shimoji-shima is included within the Irabu Prefectural Natural Park and is the main setting for the anime series Stratos 4.

Shimojishima Airport is located on the island.

== Climate ==
Climate data for Shimoji-shima (2003−2020 normals, extremes 2003−present)
Month	Jan	Feb	Mar	Apr	May	Jun	Jul	Aug	Sep	Oct	Nov	Dec	Year
Record high °C (°F)	27.5 (81.5)	27.5 (81.5)	28.2 (82.8)	29.9 (85.8)	32.6 (90.7)	34.2 (93.6)	36.1 (97.0)	35.0 (95.0)	34.4 (93.9)	33.6 (92.5)	31.1 (88.0)	28.8 (83.8)	36.1 (97.0)
Mean daily maximum °C (°F)	21.2 (70.2)	22.1 (71.8)	23.1 (73.6)	25.3 (77.5)	28.2 (82.8)	30.4 (86.7)	32.1 (89.8)	31.8 (89.2)	30.9 (87.6)	28.7 (83.7)	26.2 (79.2)	22.7 (72.9)	26.9 (80.4)
Daily mean °C (°F)	18.4 (65.1)	19.1 (66.4)	20.1 (68.2)	22.4 (72.3)	25.2 (77.4)	27.8 (82.0)	29.1 (84.4)	28.8 (83.8)	27.9 (82.2)	25.8 (78.4)	23.4 (74.1)	20.0 (68.0)	24.0 (75.2)
Mean daily minimum °C (°F)	15.9 (60.6)	16.6 (61.9)	17.4 (63.3)	19.9 (67.8)	22.9 (73.2)	25.7 (78.3)	26.8 (80.2)	26.4 (79.5)	25.5 (77.9)	23.6 (74.5)	21.2 (70.2)	17.7 (63.9)	21.6 (70.9)
Record low °C (°F)	7.0 (44.6)	6.8 (44.2)	8.9 (48.0)	11.8 (53.2)	14.4 (57.9)	18.7 (65.7)	22.0 (71.6)	23.1 (73.6)	18.6 (65.5)	16.5 (61.7)	13.3 (55.9)	7.3 (45.1)	6.8 (44.2)
Average precipitation mm (inches)	124.5 (4.90)	103.5 (4.07)	110.8 (4.36)	142.2 (5.60)	197.0 (7.76)	192.0 (7.56)	112.5 (4.43)	262.2 (10.32)	224.9 (8.85)	130.5 (5.14)	159.0 (6.26)	120.8 (4.76)	1,879.7 (74.00)
Average precipitation days (≥ 1.0 mm)	12.2	10.7	9.7	9.3	10.5	10.2	8.3	12.1	10.3	9.3	11.0	11.6	125.2
Source: JMA

== See also ==
- Irabu Island
