= Tarama, Okinawa =

Island within Ryukyu Islands

Tarama 多良間村
- Village
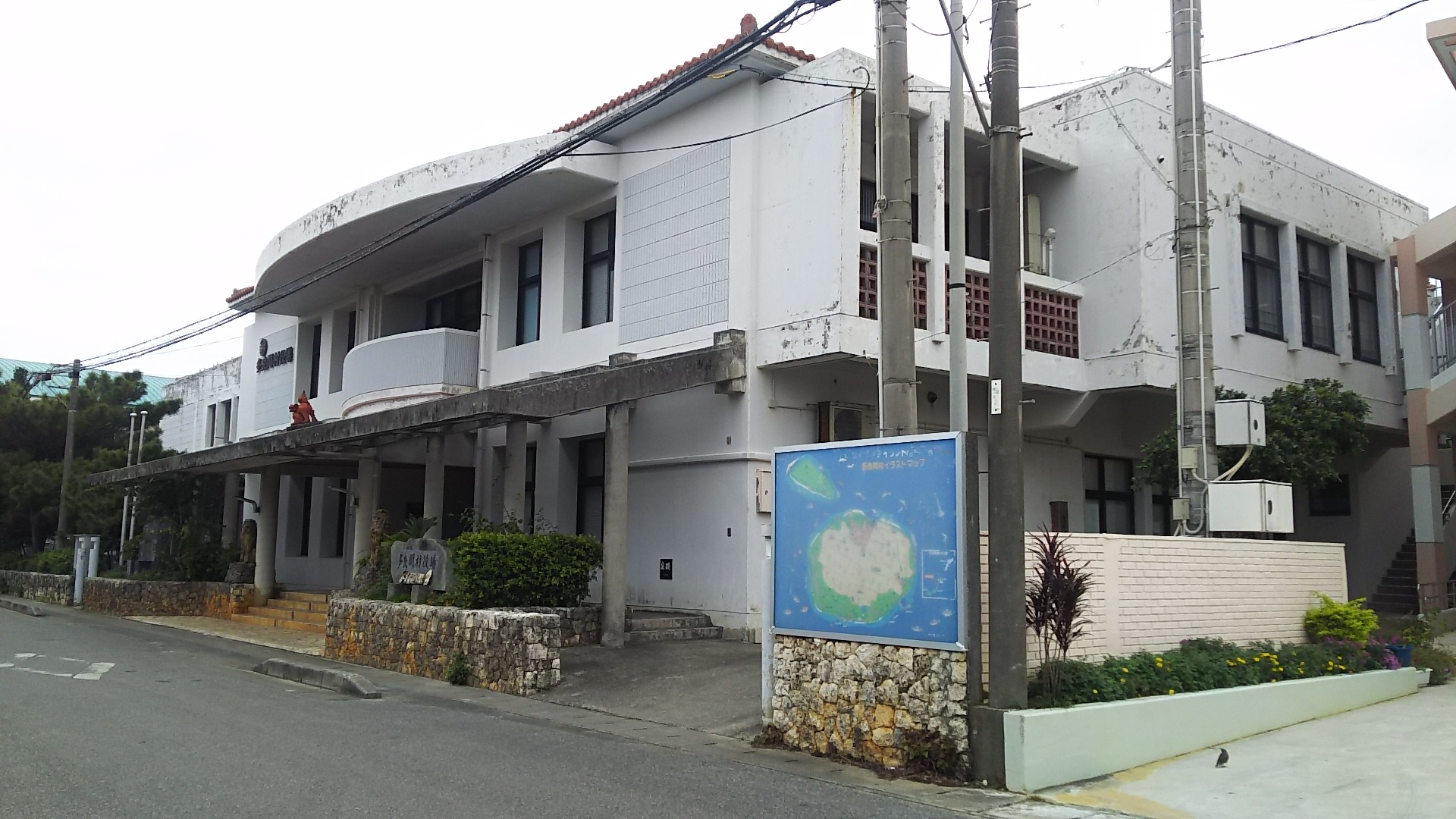
- Tarama Village Hall

- Flag Seal

- Location of Tarama in Okinawa Prefecture

- Location of Tarama within Okinawa Prefecture Location of Tarama within Japan
- Coordinates: 24°40′10″N 124°42′6″E
- Country: Japan
- Region: Kyushu (Ryukyu)
- Prefecture: Okinawa Prefecture
- District: Miyako

Government
  - Mayor: Masaaki Shimoji

Area
  - Total: 22.00 km^{2} (8.49 sq mi)

Population (2020 National Census)
  - Total: 1,058
  - Density: 48.1/km^{2} (125/sq mi)
- Time zone: UTC+09:00 (JST)
- City hall address: 99-2 Nakasuji, Tarama-son, Miyako-gun, Okinawa-ken; 906-0602
- Climate: Af
- Website: www.vill.tarama.okinawa.jp
- Symbols
- Bird: Japanese quail
- Fish: Grouper
- Flower: Safflower
- Tree: Fukugi (Garcinia subelliptica)

Tarama (多良間村, Tarama-son; Miyako & Okinawan: Tarama) is a village in Miyako District, Okinawa Prefecture, Japan, consisting of Tarama Island and Minna Island, between Ishigaki Island and Miyako Island.

As of 2020, the village had a population of 1,058 residents and 466 households, with a density of 48.1 persons per km^{2}. The total area is 22.00 square kilometres (8.49 square miles).

== History ==
Under the Ryukyu Kingdom (from 1429 to 1879), Tarama is said to have been used as a penal colony for political prisoners.

In 1879, with the abolition of the han system and creation of the prefectures of Japan, Tarama became part of the newly formed Okinawa Prefecture. In 1896 the village became part of Miyako District. In 1908, with the abolishment of the magiri system in Okinawa, the three districts of the present-day village, Nakasuzu, Shiyugaa, and Minna, became part of the village of Hirara. They were separated from Hirara in 1913 as part of a further redistricting of Okinawa, and incorporated as the Village of Tarama.

During the Second World War there was a small Japanese garrison on the island, and it was bombarded by the Allies by air and sea during the Battle of Okinawa, although there was practically nothing to bomb.

The village hall of Tarama was the first modern tiled structured to be built on the islands, and the first village council consisted of eight citizens. Residents of Minna completed a planned relocation to the Takano district of Hirara in 1961.

Tarama was electrified and received direct telephone service in 1964, and residents were supplied with power for five hours a day. This increased to 17 hours a day by 1969, and the village was fully electrified in 1972. Regular ferry service to the village began in the same period, and Tarama Airport was opened in December 1971.

== Geography ==
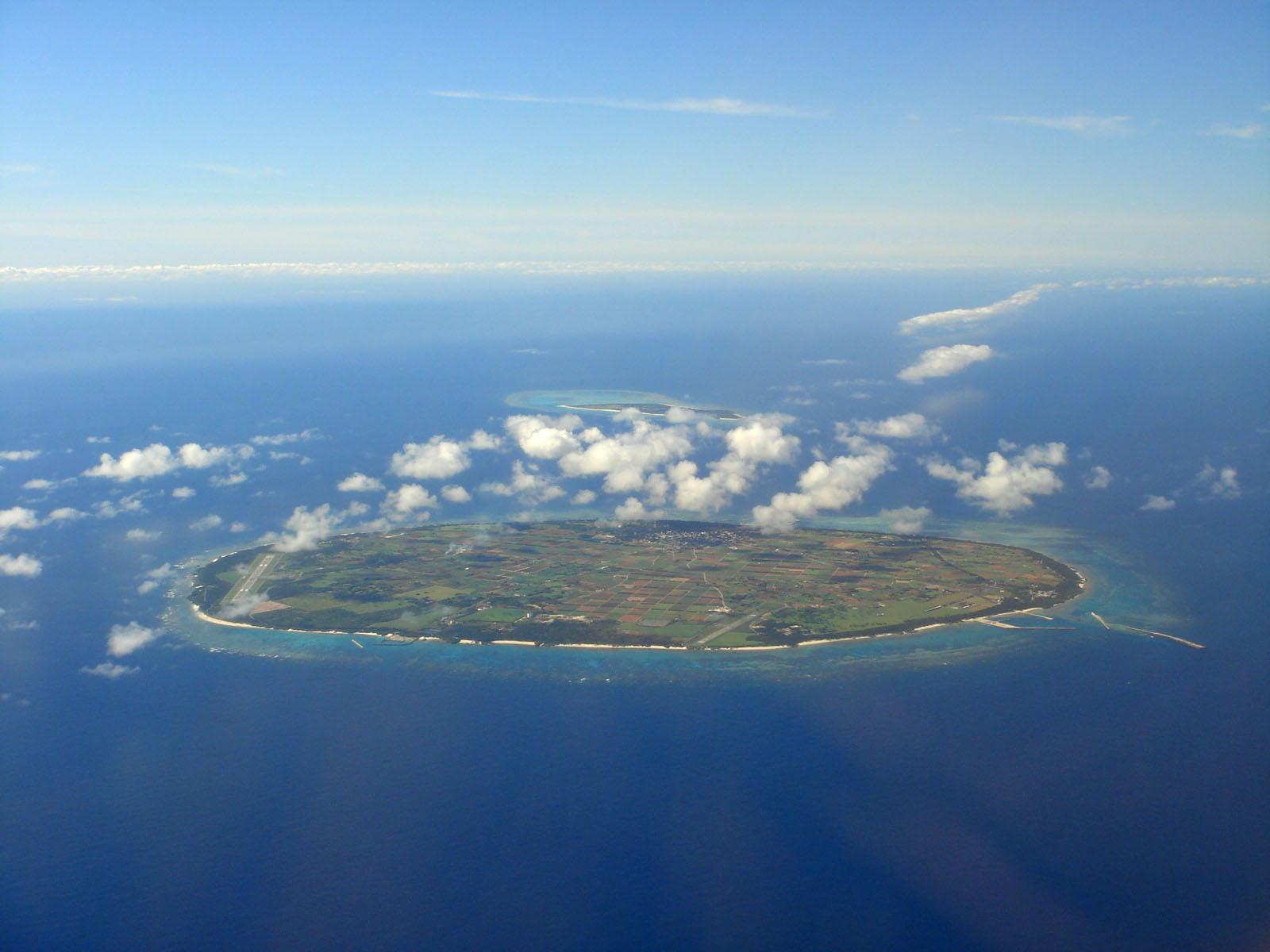
Tarama Island (front) and Minna Island (back)

The two islands of the village, Tarama and Minna, are located at the midpoint between Ishigaki Island and Miyako Island. The islands face the Pacific Ocean to the south and the East China Sea to the north. The two islands have historically suffered from typhoon damage and drought.

=== Administrative divisions ===
The village is divided in three wards.

- Minna (水納)
- Nakasuji (仲筋)
- Shiokawa (塩川)

=== Climate ===
Tarama has tropical rainforest climate (Köppen climate classification Af), bordering on a humid subtropical climate (Köppen climate classification Cfa).

Climate data for Tarama, Okinawa (2003−2020 normals, extremes 1978−present)
Month	Jan	Feb	Mar	Apr	May	Jun	Jul	Aug	Sep	Oct	Nov	Dec	Year
Record high °C (°F)	27.5 (81.5)	28.0 (82.4)	29.0 (84.2)	31.2 (88.2)	32.7 (90.9)	34.6 (94.3)	35.0 (95.0)	35.4 (95.7)	34.6 (94.3)	32.9 (91.2)	31.0 (87.8)	29.2 (84.6)	35.4 (95.7)
Mean daily maximum °C (°F)	21.3 (70.3)	22.2 (72.0)	23.4 (74.1)	25.8 (78.4)	28.6 (83.5)	31.0 (87.8)	32.5 (90.5)	32.0 (89.6)	31.1 (88.0)	28.8 (83.8)	26.2 (79.2)	22.7 (72.9)	27.1 (80.8)
Daily mean °C (°F)	18.7 (65.7)	19.5 (67.1)	20.4 (68.7)	22.8 (73.0)	25.6 (78.1)	28.2 (82.8)	29.5 (85.1)	29.1 (84.4)	28.1 (82.6)	26.0 (78.8)	23.6 (74.5)	20.2 (68.4)	24.3 (75.8)
Mean daily minimum °C (°F)	16.3 (61.3)	17.0 (62.6)	17.8 (64.0)	20.3 (68.5)	23.3 (73.9)	26.1 (79.0)	27.2 (81.0)	26.7 (80.1)	25.7 (78.3)	23.9 (75.0)	21.5 (70.7)	17.9 (64.2)	22.0 (71.6)
Record low °C (°F)	7.5 (45.5)	6.6 (43.9)	7.2 (45.0)	10.4 (50.7)	13.4 (56.1)	18.0 (64.4)	22.8 (73.0)	23.1 (73.6)	18.2 (64.8)	16.6 (61.9)	11.9 (53.4)	6.1 (43.0)	6.1 (43.0)
Average precipitation mm (inches)	135.1 (5.32)	111.5 (4.39)	111.3 (4.38)	138.7 (5.46)	183.9 (7.24)	177.9 (7.00)	136.1 (5.36)	237.0 (9.33)	246.1 (9.69)	159.8 (6.29)	167.2 (6.58)	132.4 (5.21)	1,943.2 (76.50)
Average precipitation days (≥ 1.0 mm)	13.1	11.2	10.0	9.2	10.3	9.5	8.8	12.1	11.7	9.7	10.8	12.9	129.3
Source: JMA

== Demographics ==
Tarama has seen population decline since the beginning of the 20th century. Before World War II typhoon damage and drought caused many residents to leave the island, mostly to Osaka and areas of the newly formed Japanese Empire. Residents of Tarama emigrated to Taiwan, the South Pacific, Korea, and Manchuria in this period. Residents of Minna completed a planned relocation to the Takano district of Hirara in 1961. There is only one household, of two people, on Minna Island.

== Education ==
The village of Tarama has one preschool, one elementary school, and one junior high school, all named Tarama.

- Tarama Elementary School (多良間小学校)
- Tarama Junior High School (多良間中学校)
- Tarama Kindergarten (多良間幼稚園)

The preschool and Tarama Elementary school are connected, and located directly south of the village hall at the north of the island. Tarama Junior High School is located .5 kilometres (0.31 mi) south of the village hall. Minna, due to its depopulation, no longer has any educational institutions. The village has no high school; students must leave the island to attend high schools in other areas of Okinawa Prefecture.

== Transportation ==
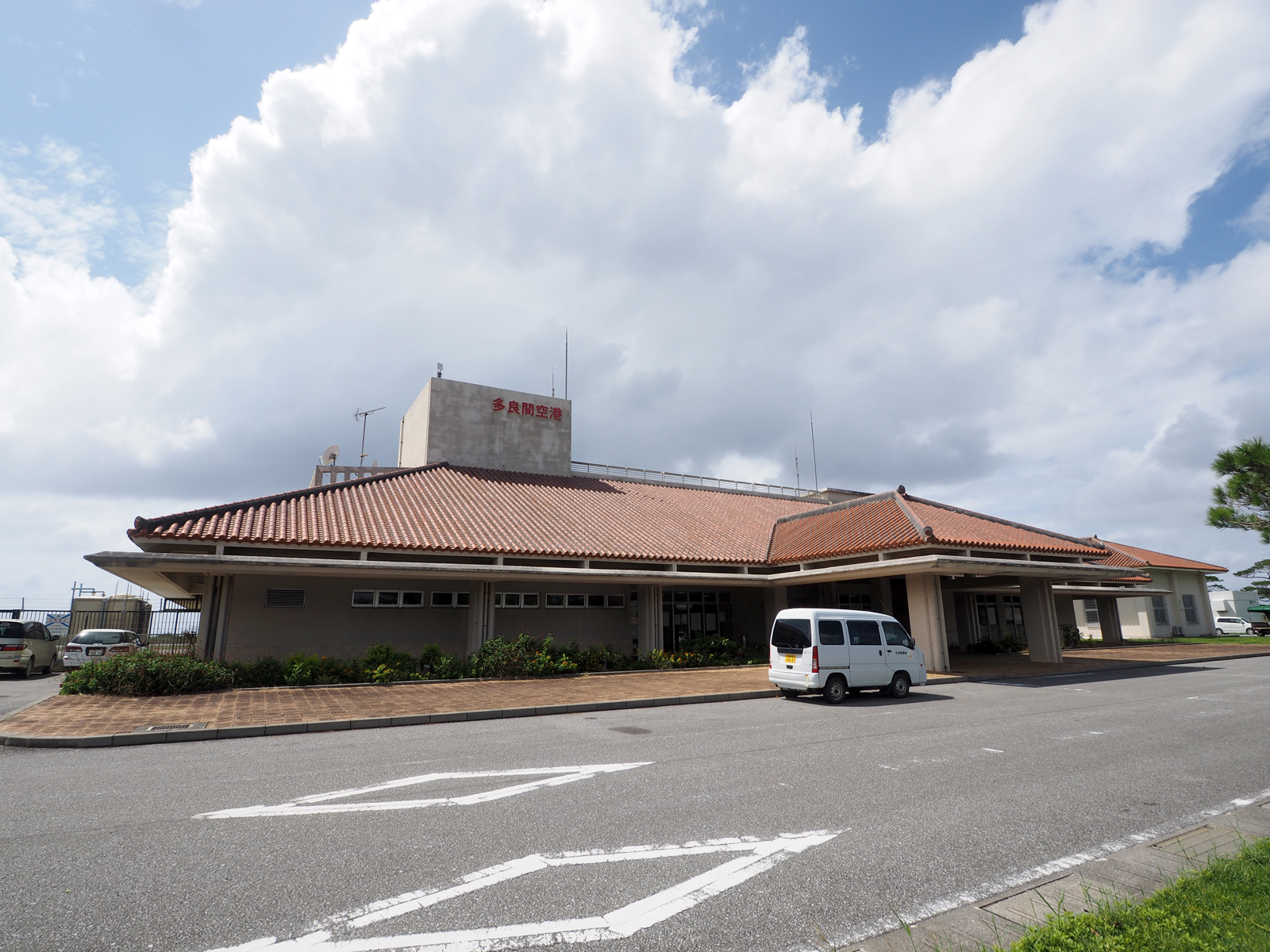
Tarama Airport

Tarama Airport serves the island.

== Cultural and natural assets ==
Tarama Village hosts sixty designated or registered tangible cultural properties and monuments, at the national, prefectural or municipal level.

- Name (Japanese) (Type of registration)

=== Cultural Properties ===
- Documents relating to the Oyazato Family (親里家文書) (Prefectural)
- Genealogy of a branch line of the Shōei Clan (1) (向裔氏支流系図、家譜) (Municipal)
- Genealogy of a branch line of the Shōei Clan (2) (向裔氏支流系図、家譜) (Municipal)
- Genealogy of a branch line of the Shōei Clan (3) (向裔氏支流系図、家譜) (Municipal)
- Genealogy of the branch line of the Ntabaru Clan (土原氏支流系図、家譜) (Municipal)
- Genealogy of the Chūdō Clan (忠導氏系図、家譜) (Municipal)
- Genealogy of the main line of the Ntabaru Clan (土原氏正統系図、家譜) (Municipal)
- Genealogy of the main line of the Shōei Clan (向裔氏正統系図、家譜) (Municipal)
- Genealogy of the Urato Clan (浦渡氏系図、家譜) (Municipal)
- Hanging scroll inscribed 寿 (掛床(寿)) (Municipal)
- Hanging scroll inscribed 福 (掛床(福)) (Municipal)
- Kumiodori script (組踊台本) (Municipal)
- Land Register (土地台帳) (Municipal)
- Land Registry Map (地籍図) (Municipal)
- Land Tax Register (地租名寄帳) (Municipal)
- Plaque inscribed 龍光 (扁額(龍光)) (Municipal)
- Register from the Year of the Ox (丑年惣頭帳) (Municipal)
- Register from the Year of the Rat (子年惣頭帳) (Municipal)
- Taishang Ganying Pian (Lao Tse's Treatise on the Response of the Tao) (太上感応篇) (Municipal)
- Wage Records (俸給文書) (Municipal)
- Yoseyama Regulations (与世山規模帳) (Municipal)

=== Folk Cultural Properties ===
- Futenma Utaki Sacred Site (普天間御嶽)
- Minema Utaki Sacred Site (嶺間御嶽)
- Minna Utaki Sacred Site (水納御嶽)
- Tomari Utaki Sacred Site (泊御嶽)

=== Historic Sites ===
- Ama-gā spring (アマガー) (Municipal)
- Bunajē Ugam Praying Site (ブナジェーウガム°) (Municipal)
- Fushato-gā spring (フシャトガー) (Municipal)
- Futajji Ugam Praying Site (フタッジウガム°) (Municipal)
- Futatsu-gā spring (フタツガー) (Municipal)
- Gratitude Memorial (報恩の碑) (Municipal)
- Ibi Praying Site and Shinobose Residence (イビの拝所と仕上世屋跡) (Municipal)
- Kadikari-nu-uya Residence (カディカリ°ヌウヤ屋敷跡) (Municipal)
- Minna Utaki Archaeological Site (水納御嶽遺跡) (Municipal)
- Miyako Watchtower (宮古遠見台) (Municipal)
- Ntabaru Tuyumya's Myāka Tomb on Terama Island (多良間島の土原豊見親のミャーカ) (Prefectural)
- Ntabaru Ugam Praying Site (土原ウガム°) (Municipal)
- Ntabaru Ugan Archaeological Site (土原ウガン遺跡) (Municipal)
- Parima-gā spring (パリマガー) (Municipal)
- Piitumata Ugam Praying Site (ピィ°トゥマタウガム°) (Municipal)
- Satunushi-baka Tomb (里之子墓) (Municipal)
- Shiokawa Utaki Archaeological Site (塩川御嶽遺跡) (Municipal)
- Shiokawa Utaki Sacred Site (塩川御嶽) (Municipal)
- Shugā-gā Spring (シュガーガー) (Municipal)
- Takada Coast, Dutch merchant ship (高田海岸、オランダ商船) (Municipal)
- Tarama Jinja Shrine (多良間神社) (Municipal)
- Terayama Site (寺山の遺跡) (Prefectural)
- Torizuka Site on Minna Island (水納島の鳥塚) (Municipal)
- Uigusuku-Kandō Residence (ウイグスクカンドウヌ屋敷跡) (Municipal)
- Ungusuku Utaki Sacred Site (運城御嶽) (Municipal)
- Utsubaru Ugam Praying Site (ウツバルウガム°) (Municipal)
- Yaeyama Watchtower (八重山遠見台) (Municipal)
- Yaeyama Watchtower Archaeological Site (八重山遠見台遺跡) (Municipal)

=== Natural Monuments ===
- Bantigue tree (Pemphis acidula) of Panari Rock on Minna Island (水納島のパナリのミズガンピ) (Municipal)
- Fukugi tree community of Ungusuku Utaki (運城御嶽のフクギ群落) (Prefectural)
- Plant communities and fukugi trees of Shiokawa Utaki (塩川御嶽の植物群落並びにフクギ並木) (Prefectural)
- Plant community of Minebaru on Tarama Island (多良間島の嶺原の植物群落) (Prefectural)
- Plant community of Ntabaru Utaki on Tarama Island (多良間島の土原御嶽の植物群落 ・土原ウガンの植物群落) (Prefectural)
- Shurē Ugam Praying Site (シュレーウガム°) (Municipal)
- Tarama Island windbreak forest (多良間島の抱護林) (Prefectural)
