= Irabu Island =

Island within Ryukyu Islands

Native name: Irav-zuma (伊良部島)
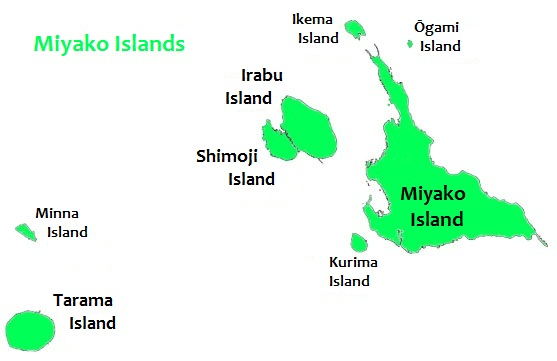
- Irabu Island is to the west of Miyako Island
- Interactive map of Irabu Island

Geography
- Location: Okinawa Prefecture
- Coordinates: 24°50′20″N 125°9′56″E
- Archipelago: Miyako Islands
- Adjacent to: East China Sea
- Area: 29.06 km^{2} (11.22 sq mi)
- Highest elevation: 89.0 m (292 ft)

Administration
- Japan
- Prefecture: Okinawa Prefecture

Demographics
- Population: 4,693 (2015 national census)
- Ethnic groups: Ryukyuan, Japanese

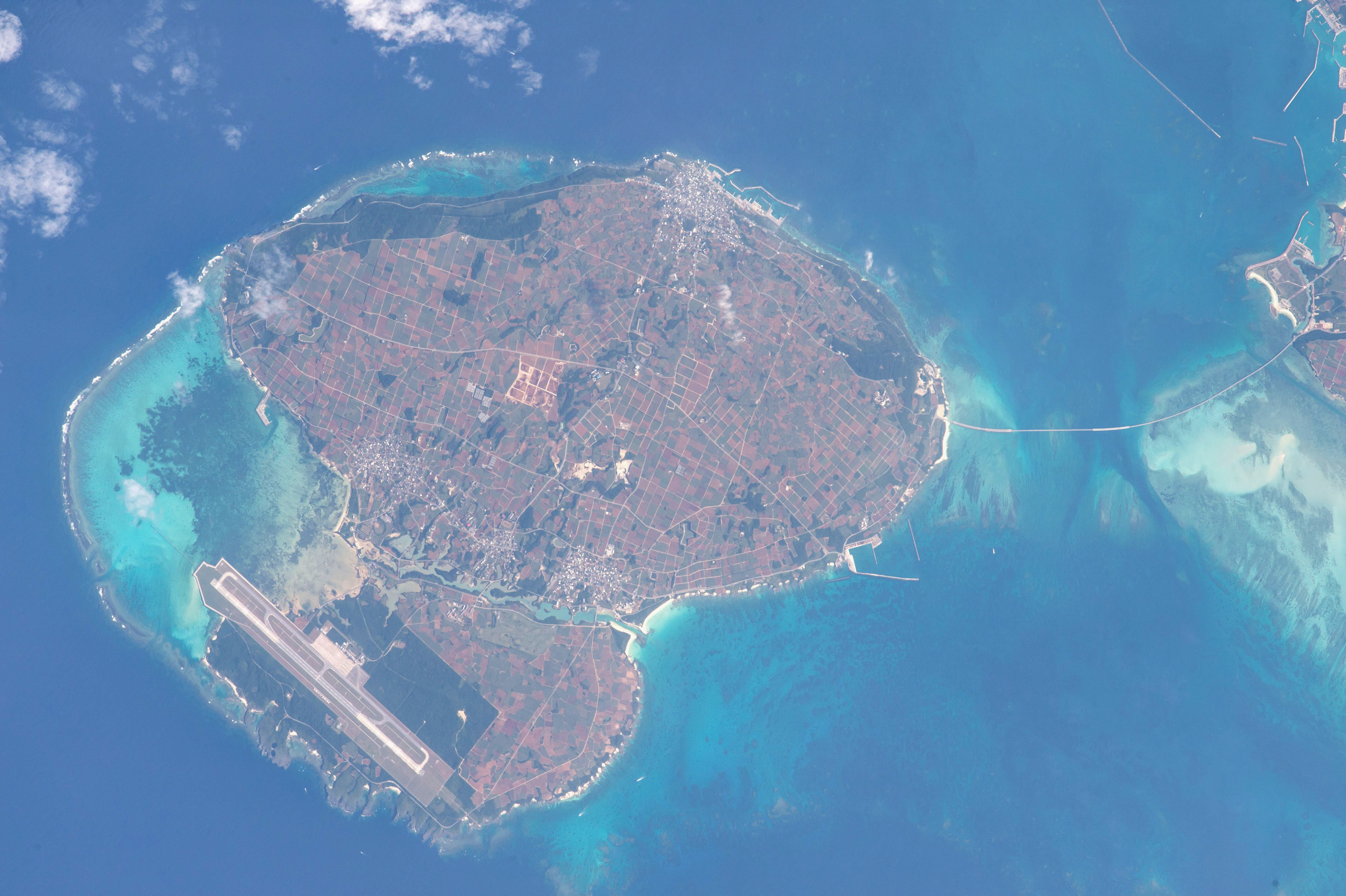
Irabu Island is in the center, Shimoji Island below, and the Irabu Bridge to the right

Irabu Island (伊良部島, Miyako: Irav-zuma), is an island in Miyakojima City, Okinawa Prefecture, Japan. The island is connected to Miyako Island by a 3,540-metre-long (11,610 ft) bridge Irabu Ohashi (伊良部大橋‌), which was completed in January 2015. Irabu Island is also connected via six bridges to Shimoji-shima. There are multiple language variants spoken on the island: Nakachi-Irabu, Kuninaka, Sawada-Nagahama, and Sarahama (which is a variant of Ikema language spoken by descendants of emigrants from Ikema Island).

== Etymology ==
The term comes from the Japanization of the Miyakoan name Irav, in turn from Proto-Ryukyuan *erabu (tone class B). Cognates in other Ryukyuan languages include Okinoerabu irabu, referring to Okinoerabujima.

== Climate ==
Climate data for Irabu (1981−2010 normals, extremes 1978−2009)
Month	Jan	Feb	Mar	Apr	May	Jun	Jul	Aug	Sep	Oct	Nov	Dec	Year
Record high °C (°F)	27.8 (82.0)	27.5 (81.5)	29.5 (85.1)	30.2 (86.4)	32.2 (90.0)	33.8 (92.8)	35.0 (95.0)	35.1 (95.2)	33.9 (93.0)	31.8 (89.2)	31.2 (88.2)	28.9 (84.0)	35.1 (95.2)
Mean daily maximum °C (°F)	20.2 (68.4)	20.6 (69.1)	22.4 (72.3)	24.9 (76.8)	27.4 (81.3)	29.8 (85.6)	31.7 (89.1)	31.2 (88.2)	30.0 (86.0)	27.8 (82.0)	24.9 (76.8)	21.7 (71.1)	26.1 (78.9)
Daily mean °C (°F)	17.8 (64.0)	18.1 (64.6)	19.8 (67.6)	22.3 (72.1)	24.7 (76.5)	27.2 (81.0)	28.8 (83.8)	28.3 (82.9)	27.2 (81.0)	25.2 (77.4)	22.5 (72.5)	19.5 (67.1)	23.5 (74.2)
Mean daily minimum °C (°F)	15.5 (59.9)	15.8 (60.4)	17.2 (63.0)	19.9 (67.8)	22.3 (72.1)	25.1 (77.2)	26.4 (79.5)	25.9 (78.6)	24.8 (76.6)	23.1 (73.6)	20.5 (68.9)	17.3 (63.1)	21.2 (70.1)
Record low °C (°F)	6.9 (44.4)	6.3 (43.3)	5.1 (41.2)	10.0 (50.0)	14.3 (57.7)	16.3 (61.3)	22.0 (71.6)	21.5 (70.7)	17.5 (63.5)	16.7 (62.1)	10.0 (50.0)	6.4 (43.5)	5.1 (41.2)
Average precipitation mm (inches)	116.9 (4.60)	122.4 (4.82)	128.6 (5.06)	152.1 (5.99)	184.6 (7.27)	174.3 (6.86)	102.4 (4.03)	208.0 (8.19)	194.6 (7.66)	129.6 (5.10)	116.1 (4.57)	129.0 (5.08)	1,758.4 (69.23)
Average precipitation days (≥ 1.0 mm)	12.9	11.7	12.9	10.2	10.7	10.4	9.2	12.3	11.9	9.2	11.1	10.5	133
Mean monthly sunshine hours	93.9	94.6	125.0	127.8	130.0	150.7	208.1	210.6	189.2	170.3	128.3	111.5	1,740
Source: JMA

== See also ==
- Shimoji Island
- Ikema Island
- Miyako Island
