= Ōgimi =

Ōgimi 大宜味村 Igimi (Ōgimi Kunigami), Ujimii (Nakijin Knigami), Ujimi (Okinawan)
- Village
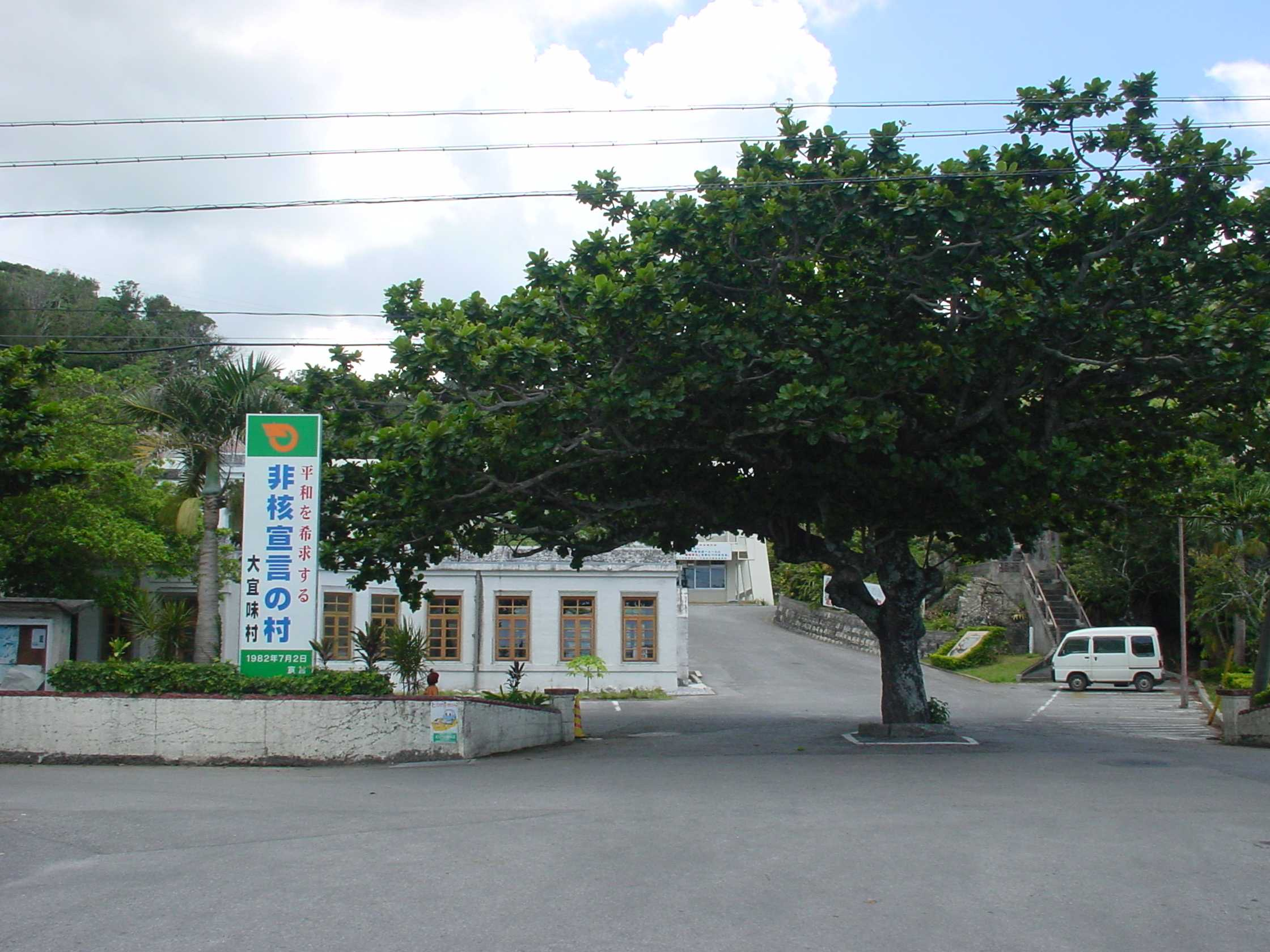
- Ogimi Village Office

- Flag Seal

- Location of Ōgimi in Okinawa Prefecture

- Location in Japan
- Coordinates: 26°42′6″N 128°7′13″E
- Country: Japan
- Region: Kyushu (Okinawa)
- Prefecture: Okinawa Prefecture
- District: Kunigami

Area
  - Total: 63.12 km^{2} (24.37 sq mi)

Population (1 October 2016)
  - Total: 3,024
  - Density: 47.91/km^{2} (124.1/sq mi)
- Time zone: UTC+09:00 (JST)
- Website: www.vill.ogimi.okinawa.jp

Ōgimi (大宜味村, Ōgimi-son; Ōgimi Kunigami: Igimi, Nakijin Kunigami: Ujimii, Okinawan: Ujimi) is a village located in Kunigami District, Okinawa Prefecture, Japan.

As of October 2016, the village has an estimated population of 3,024 and a population density of 51 persons per km^{2}. The total area is 63.12 square kilometres (24.37 mi^{2}).

Several censuses have established that this village has the highest longevity index in the world with a large percentage of the population being over 100 years old.

== Geography ==
Ōgimi is located at the north of Okinawa Island and faces the East China Sea on the western coast of the island. The village consists of forested flatland, which covers 78% of the area of the Ōgimi, and sharp, craggy cliffs which face the coast. The central coastal area of Ōgimi is bisected by Shioya Bay. Miyagi Island (.24 square kilometres (0.093 mi^{2})) spans much of the entrance of the bay, and the island is connected to the mainland by the Shioya Ōhashi Bridge.

=== Administrative divisions ===
The village includes seventeen wards.

- Esu (江洲)
- Janagusuku (謝名城)
- Kijoka (喜如嘉)
- Miyagi (宮城)
- Nerome (根路銘)
- Nūha (饒波)
- Ōganeku (大兼久)
- Ōgimi (大宜味)
- Oshikawa (押川)
- Shioya (塩屋)
- Shirahama (白浜)
- Taiho (大保)
- Takazato (田嘉里)
- Taminato (田港)
- Tsuha (津波)
- Uehara (上原)
- Yako (屋古)

== Culture ==
The village is a centre of production of Ryukyuan pottery.

The Shioya Ungami Sea Festival is held at Shioya Bay and other areas of Ōgimi in July. Observance of the festival dates back 400 to 500 years to the period of the Ryukyuan Kingdom, and begins with prayers at an asagi, or house of worship, by kaminchu, or priestesses of the Okinawan religion. The religious ceremonies are followed by dragon boat races. The Unjami Festival was designated an Important Intangible Folk Cultural Properties of Japan in 1997.

== Cultural and natural assets ==
Ōgimi Village hosts five designated or registered tangible cultural properties and monuments, at the national, prefectural or municipal level.

- Name (Japanese) (Type of registration)

=== Cultural Properties ===
- Former Ōgimi Village Office Building (大宜味村役場旧庁舎) (National)

=== Natural Monuments ===
- Lantern trees Hernandia nymphaeifolia of Shioya-ufuncha (塩屋ウフンチャのハスノハギリ) (Municipal)
- Ōgimi Utaki fountain palm community Livistona chinensis (大宜味御嶽のビロウ群落) (Prefectural)
- Plate coral of Kijoka Itashiki Coast (喜如嘉板敷海岸の板干瀬) (Prefectural)
- Tanna Ugan plant community (田港御願の植物群落) (National)

== Education ==
The village operates its public primary and junior high schools.

- Ogimi Junior High (大宜味中学校)
- Ogimi Elementary (大宜味小学校)
  - It formed in 2016 as a merger of four elementary schools.

The Okinawa Prefectural Board of Education operates Hentona High School.

== See also ==
- Yanbaru
