= Amami-Ōshima Island, Tokunoshima Island, northern part of Okinawa Island, and Iriomote Island =

UNESCO World Heritage Site
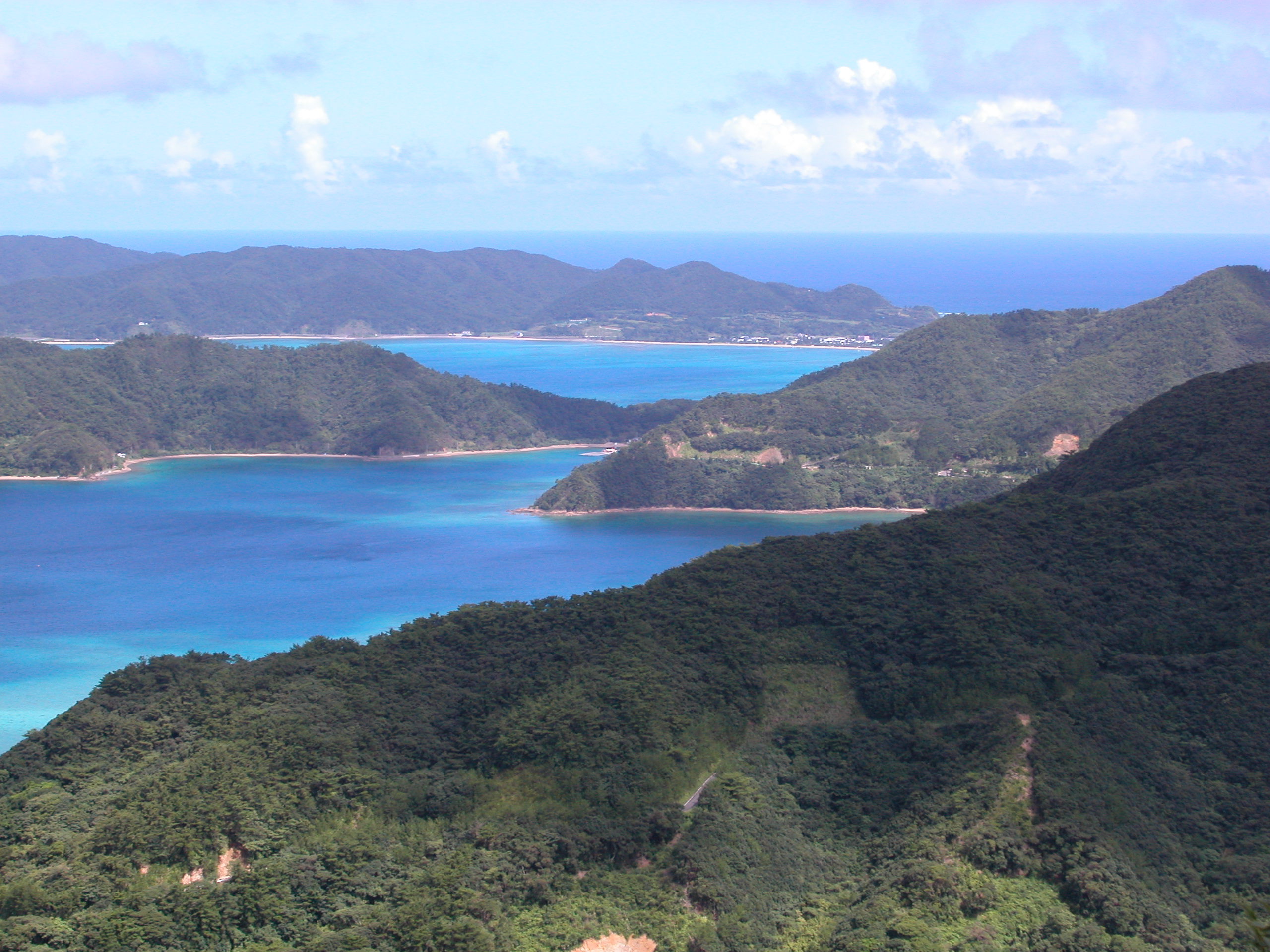
- Amami-Ōshima

- Location within Japan
- Location: Nansei Islands, Japan
- Criteria: Natural: X
- Reference: 1574
- Inscription: 2021 (44th Session)
- Area: 42,698 ha (164.86 sq mi)
- Buffer zone: 24,467 ha (94.47 sq mi)
- Coordinates: 28°16′45″N 129°22′42″E

Amami-Ōshima Island, Tokunoshima Island, northern part of Okinawa Island, and Iriomote Island (奄美大島、徳之島、沖縄島北部及び西表島) is a serial UNESCO World Heritage Site consisting of five component parts on four Japanese islands in the Ryukyu Arc (Nansei Islands). The site was selected in terms of biodiversity (World Heritage criterion x) for having a diverse ecosystem of plant and animal species that are unique to the region.

== History ==
First selected as a candidate site in 2003, the original nomination was added to the Tentative List in 2016; after initial IUCN evaluation, in 2018 the nomination was withdrawn for revision, prior to resubmission the following year; after further evaluation, in 2021 IUCN recommended inscription in July of the revised nomination. UNESCO voted to list it as a World Heritage Site in 2021.

=== Naming dispute ===
In the long history of the campaign for registration, this candidate site was renamed at least twice. When a panel of natural scientists formally added it to Japan's tentative list of nomination, it was given the name of Ryūkyū Shotō. This followed a convention of natural sciences but is inconsistent with the official definition provided by the Japanese government, which excludes the Amami Islands from the Ryūkyū Shotō. Moreover, the Amami Islands and Kagoshima Prefecture as a whole voiced a strong opposition to having the label Ryūkyū imposed on themselves. As a result, the candidate site was renamed to Amami–Ryukyu. In late 2015, UNESCO's committee recommended Japan "from a technical perspective" to use an accurate designation of the areas under nomination. In response, the candidate site was renamed again to the current, highly descriptive name in 2016.

== Components ==
The serial World Heritage Site comprises five component parts on four islands:

ID	Component	Archipelago	Prefecture	Image	Central point	Area (ha)	Buffer zone (ha)
1574-001	Amami-Ōshima Island 奄美大島	Amami Islands	Kagoshima		28°16′45″N 129°22′42″E	11,640	14,663
1574-002	Tokunoshima Island (a) 徳之島	Amami Islands	Kagoshima		27°45′48″N 128°58′02″E	1,724	1,813
1574-003	Tokunoshima Island (b) 徳之島	Amami Islands	Kagoshima		27°51′48″N 128°55′46″E	791	999
1574-004	Northern part of Okinawa Island 沖縄島北部	Okinawa Islands	Okinawa		26°43′29″N 128°13′12″E	7,721	3,398
1574-005	Iriomote Island 西表島	Yaeyama Islands	Okinawa		24°19′34″N 123°48′31″E	20,822	3,594

== Biodiversity ==
Within the total area of 426.98 square kilometres (164.86 sq mi) are found some 1,819 vascular plants, 21 terrestrial mammals, 394 birds, 21 amphibians, 36 terrestrial reptiles, and 267 inland fish, including endemics such as the Amami rabbit, Okinawa rail, and Iriomote cat. Of the above, 189 species of vascular plant are endemic (c.10% of the total number of species found), as are 13 terrestrial mammals (62%), 5 birds, 18 amphibians (86%), 23 reptiles (64%), and 14 inland fish. Of the 6,153 insect species found, 1,607 are endemic.

=== Endemic taxa ===
Endemic taxa include the following, with EDGE species marked with an asterisk (though an EDGE species, Iriomote's Kampira Falls frog is not listed below, since it is found also in Taiwan):

	Amami-Ōshima	Tokunoshima	Okinawa	Iriomote
Mammals	*Amami rabbit *Ryukyu spiny rat *Ryukyu long-tailed giant rat Ryukyu shrew Ryukyu tube-nosed bat Yanbaru whiskered bat *Ryukyu bent-winged bat	*Amami rabbit *Tokunoshima spiny rat *Ryukyu long-tailed giant rat Ryukyu shrew Ryukyu tube-nosed bat Yanbaru whiskered bat *Ryukyu bent-winged bat	*Muennink's spiny rat *Ryukyu long-tailed giant rat Ryukyu tube-nosed bat Yanbaru whiskered bat Orii's fruit bat *Ryukyu bent-winged bat	Iriomote cat *Ryukyu bent-winged bat Yaeyama fruit bat Ryukyu wild boar
Birds	*Amami woodcock Amami thrush *Lidth's jay Luscinia komadori komadori Dendrocopos leucotos owstoni	*Amami woodcock Luscinia komadori namiyei	*Okinawa rail Okinawa woodpecker Luscinia komadori namiyei	Iriomote tit Spilornis cheela perplexus
Amphibians	*Anderson's crocodile newt Sword-tail newt Amami tip-nosed frog *Otton frog Odorrana splendida	*Anderson's crocodile newt Amami tip-nosed frog	*Anderson's crocodile newt Sword-tail newt *Ishikawa's frog Ryukyu tip-nosed frog Holst's frog *Namie's frog	Greater tip-nosed frog Utsunomiya's tip-nosed frog
Reptiles	*Barbour's blue-tailed skink Protobothrops flavoviridis Dinodon semicarinatum Sinomicrurus japonicus japonicus	*Banded ground gecko *Barbour's blue-tailed skink Protobothrops flavoviridis Dinodon semicarinatum Sinomicrurus japonicus boettgeri	*Ryukyu black-breasted leaf turtle *Kuroiwa's ground gecko *Barbour's blue-tailed skink Protobothrops flavoviridis Dinodon semicarinatum Sinomicrurus japonicus boettgeri	Yaeyama pond turtle Boettger's ground skink *Kishinoue's giant skink *Sakishima grass lizard Yaeyama yellow-margined box turtle Elaphe taeniura schmackeri
Inland fish	Ryukyu ayu Parioglossus caeruleolineatus Stiphodon imperiorientis Acanthogobius insularis Luciogobius ryukyuensis		Stiphodon imperiorientis Luciogobius ryukyuensis	Eviota ocellifer Stiphodon imperiorientis Parkraemeria saltator
Crustaceans	Amamiku amamensis Geothelphusa obtusipes Geothelphusa sakamotoana	Amamiku amamensis Geothelphusa obtusipes Geothelphusa sakamotoana	Caridina okinawa Candidiopotamon okinawense Geothelphusa grandiovata Geothelphusa tenuimanus Geothelphusa aramotoi	Neocaridina iriomotensis Neocaridina brevirostris Macrobrachium shokitai Caridina macrodentata Geothelphusa fulva Geothelphusa minei
Insects	Asiagomphus amamiensis amamiensis Neolucanus progenetivus progenetivus	Matrona basilaris japonica Neolucanus progenetivus progenetivus	Cheirotonus jambar Neolucanus okinawanus Rhipidolestes shozoi	Asiagomphus yayeyamensis Rhinocypha uenoi Neolucanus insulicola insulicola
Plants	Asarum fudsinoi Viola amamiana Cardiandra amamiohsimensis	Asarum hatsushimae Polypodium amamianum Solenogyne mikadoi	Pieris japonica var. koidzumi	Satakentia liukiuensis Asarum gelasinum Solenogyne mikadoi Ochlodes asahinai Deutzia yaeyamensis Viola tashiroi

In addition to the above, Okinawan avian subspecies found in Yanbaru (the northern part of Okinawa) include those of the Ashy minivet, Brown-eared bulbul, brown boobook, Collared scops owl, Japanese bush warbler, Japanese paradise flycatcher, Japanese pygmy woodpecker, Japanese tit, Japanese white-eye, Large-billed crow, Narcissus flycatcher, Oriental turtle dove, Ruddy-breasted crake, Ruddy kingfisher, and Varied tit; similarly, but found in the Yaeyama Islands (which include Iriomote), are endemic subspecies of the Brown-eared bulbul, Emerald dove, Japanese pygmy woodpecker, Japanese tit, and Japanese wood pigeon.

== Protection ==
Areas of the Site and species living within are protected by a raft of complementary measures, including designation as National Parks (Amami Guntō National Park, Yanbaru National Park, Iriomote-Ishigaki National Park), Forest Biosphere Reserves (Amami Guntō Forest Biosphere Reserve, Yanbaru Forest Biosphere Reserve, Iriomote Forest Biosphere Reserve), Wildlife Protection Areas (Yuwan-dake Wildlife Protection Area, Yanbaru (Ada) Wildlife Protection Area, Yanbaru (Aha) Wildlife Protection Area, Iriomote Wildlife Protection Area, plus twenty-four Prefectural Wildlife Protection Areas), and Natural Monuments (thirty National, and a further twenty-two Prefectural Monuments).

== See also ==
- List of World Heritage Sites in Japan
- List of National Parks in Japan
- Protected Forests (Japan)
- Wildlife Protection Areas in Japan
- List of Natural Monuments of Japan (Okinawa)
- List of Natural Monuments of Japan (Kagoshima)
- Japanese Red List
