= Nansei Islands subtropical evergreen forests =

Terrestrial ecoregion of the Ryukyu Islands, Japan

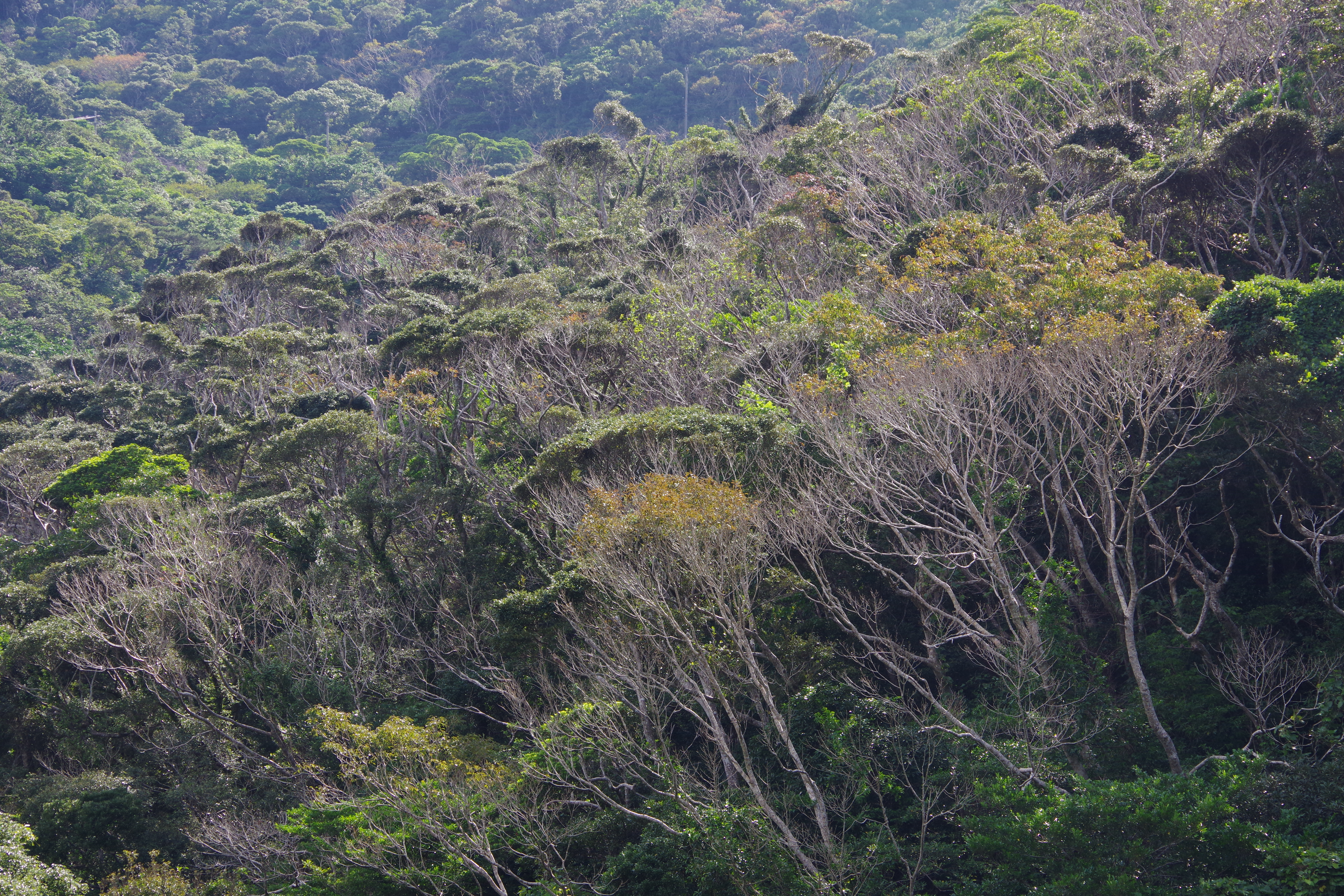
- Forest on Mount Yae, Okinawa Island

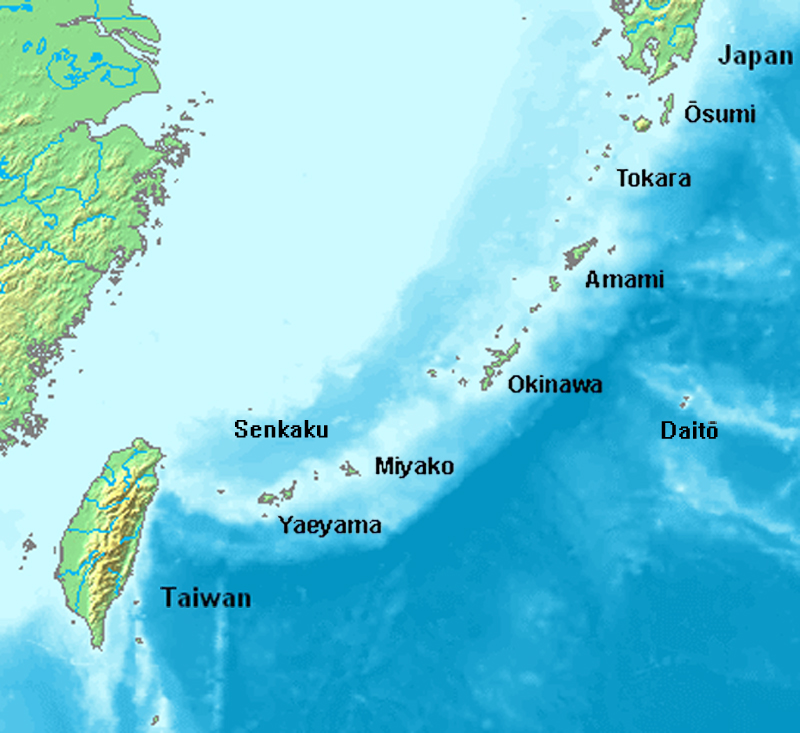
- Location of the Nansei (Ryukyu) Islands

Ecology
- Realm: Indomalayan
- Biome: tropical and subtropical moist broadleaf forests

Geography
- Area: 3,609 km^{2} (1,393 mi^{2})
- Country: Japan
- prefectures: Kagoshima Prefecture; Okinawa Prefecture

Conservation
- Conservation status: Critical/endangered
- Protected: 813 km^{2} (23%)

The Nansei Islands subtropical evergreen forests is a terrestrial ecoregion of the Ryukyu Islands, also known as the Nansei Islands, in Japan. The Nansei Islands are an island arc that stretches southwest from Kyushu towards Taiwan. The larger islands are mostly volcanic islands and the smaller ones mostly coral. The largest is Okinawa Island. The highest point is Mount Miyanoura on Yakushima Island at 1,936 metres (6,352 ft).

The ecoregion is the northernmost in the Indomalayan realm, and shares many plants with subtropical and tropical Asia.

== Climate ==
The Nansei Islands have a humid climate, which ranges from subtropical in the north to tropical in the south. The warm Kuroshio Current runs offshore, and sustains coral reefs and the northernmost mangroves in the western Pacific.

== Flora ==
The natural vegetation of the islands is subtropical broadleaf evergreen forest. The dominant trees are Castanopsis sieboldii, Quercus miyagii, Machilus thunbergii, and Schima superba. In the mountain forests of Yakushima Island, conifers including Cryptomeria japonica, Chamaecyparis obtusa, Tsuga sieboldii, and Abies firma, are mixed with the broadleaf evergreen trees above 1200 meters elevation.

Coastal and swamp plant communities include plants characteristic of the tropical Pacific, including Ipomoea pes-caprae, Spinifex littoreus, Thespesia populnea, Terminalia catappa, and Macaranga tanarius. Mangrove species include Bruguiera gymnorhiza, Heritiera littoralis, Rhizophora stylosa, Avicennia marina, Sonneratia alba, and Nypa fruticans.

Satakentia liukiuensis, the only species in the genus Satakentia, is a palm tree that is endemic to Ishigaki Island and Iriomote Island in the Yaeyama Islands.

== Fauna ==
The ecoregion corresponds to the Nansei Shoto Endemic Bird Area, and is home to several endemic bird species, including the Ryukyu green pigeon (Treron permagnus), Ryukyu robin (Larvivora komadori) and formerly the Ryukyu wood pigeon (Columba jouyi). The Okinawa rail (Gallirallus okinawae) and Okinawa woodpecker (Dendrocopos noguchii) are limited to Okinawa, and the Amami woodcock (Scolopax mira), Amami jay (Garrulus lidthi), and Amami thrush (Zoothera major) are limited to the Amami Islands. The Ryukyu minivet (Pericrocotus tegimae) is formerly endemic, but in recent decades has spread to Kyushu, Shikoku, and western Honshu.

Several threatened species live in the ecoregion and in neighboring ones. The Japanese woodpigeon (Columba janthina) lives in the Nansei Islands, Ogasawara Islands, and islands off Korea's southern coast. The Ryukyu scops owl (Otus elegans) lives in the Nansei Islands as well as Taiwan and Batanes.

== Protected areas ==
Protected areas include Yakushima National Park (325.53 km^{2}) on Yakushima Island, Amami Guntō National Park (421.81 km^{2}) on the Amami Islands, Yanbaru National Park (136.22 km^{2}) on Okinawa Island, and Iriomote-Ishigaki National Park (406 .58 km^{2}) on the Yaeyama Islands.
