= Camp Gonsalves =

U.S. Marine Corps training area in Okinawa, Japan

Coordinates: 26.688973°N 128.22916°E

Camp Gonsalves Marine Corps Jungle Warfare Training Center
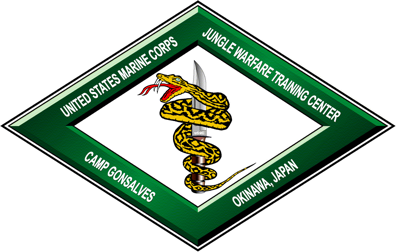
- Marine Corps Jungle Warfare Training Center logo
- Active: 1958–present
- Country: United States
- Branch: United States Marine Corps
- Type: Training Base
- Size: 30.2 square miles (78.3 km^{2})
- Part of: 3rd Marine Division
- Garrison/HQ: Marine Corps Base Camp Smedley D. Butler
- Nickname: J Dub
- Motto: Hard training makes hard Marines
- Colors: Black and Gold
- Mascot: Corporal "Millie" Milfred

Commanders
- Current commander: LtCol John E. Rehberg
- Notable commanders: Lt Gene A. Deegan (1961); Capt Oliver L. North (1973-1974); Capt Steven M. Lowery (1981-1984); Capt Glenn T. Starnes (1986) Capt Albert Estrada (1987)

Camp Gonsalves is a U.S. Marine Corps jungle warfare training area located in northern Okinawa, Japan, across the villages of Kunigami and Higashi. Established in 1958, it is the largest U.S. training facility in Okinawa. The camp is located in the Yanbaru forest protected area, raising long time ecological concerns enhanced by the 2016 plan to build new helipads.

== Terrain ==
Also known as the NTA (Northern Training Area), and since 1998 as the JWTC (Jungle Warfare Training Center) it occupies 78.3 square kilometres (30.2 mi^{2}) of jungle in Northern Okinawa. The hilly and rugged terrain is topped with single and double canopy forests. The region supplies the densely populated south of the island with drinking water. As part of the Ryukyu Islands subtropical evergreen forests, most of the area surrounding JWTC is designated as a national forest by the Government of Japan. The area is home to 24 endangered species including the Okinawa rail, Amami woodcock, Pryers woodpecker, and the Ryukyu robin. There are three species of pit viper venomous snakes, the Okinawa habu, hime habu, and the Sakishima habu. JWTC supports the local Government of Japan small Asian mongoose capturing project.

== History ==
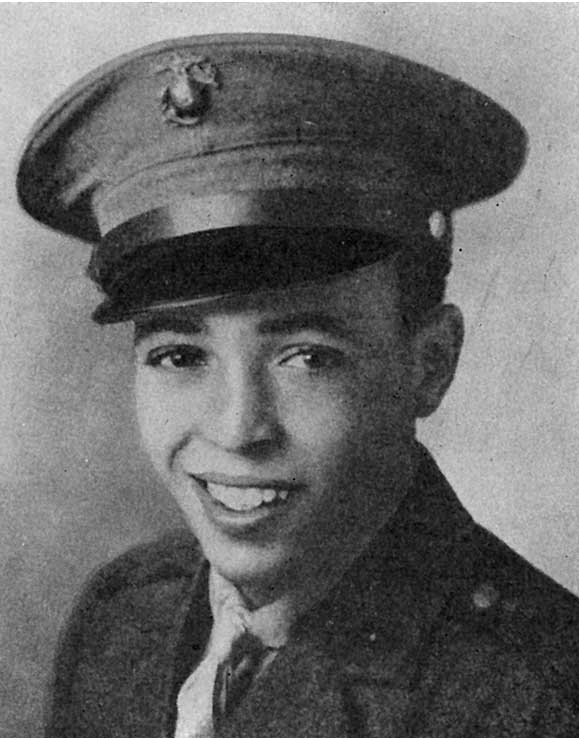
PFC Harold Gonsalves

In 1958, in the early years of the Vietnam War, the NTA (Northern Training Area) was established as a counter-guerilla school. Over the years the base camp at NTA gradually evolved from a few Quonset huts and other small buildings to a facility, which was completed in 1984. The Jungle Warfare Training Center contains 22 helicopter landing zones, one water surface beach access, four bivouac sites, three outdoor classrooms, one firebase, three Third World village target sites, and one target missile site.

On 5 November 1986, the base camp was officially named Camp Gonsalves, in memory of PFC Harold Gonsalves, who was posthumously awarded the Medal of Honor for his heroic actions during the Battle of Okinawa. In March 1998, to better convey NTA as a training base, the name was officially changed to the Marine Corps Jungle Warfare Training Center, the only existing Department of Defense jungle training facility for Marine and Joint Forces. As of March 2000, the area had 71 landowners, with a yearly rental fee of 476 million yen and a total of three Japanese employees.

=== Takae citizens' sit-in protests ===
Following various crashes of U.S. military helicopters, including one near Takae district's elementary school, local villagers started a sit-in campaign to block further construction of helipads in the area. In 2007, construction officials arrived to start building the new pads; protesters surrounded the trucks and staged a sit-in. After a long stand-off, the prefectural police arrived and ordered the construction to be halted since it was placing the lives of the protesters in danger. In 2008, the Japanese government attempted to serve injunctions against 15 participants, 13 of which were thrown out of court; the remaining two have yet to be decided.

Testing and use of herbicides, chemical, and biological agents were reportedly used on Okinawa in and around the Northern Training Area, including the Yanbaru forest and Kunigami and Higashi villages. Following the 2006 disclosure that the United States military had made widespread use of the defoliant Agent Orange in the jungle training center during the 1960s, local citizens have called for an investigation into the current use of chemical and biological weapons within the camp. The region supplies the densely populated south of the island with drinking water and the impact on long-term health is of grave concern.

The construction of six new helipads has led to increased demonstrations and protests in July 2016.

=== Land reversion ===
A 1996 agreement included returning 17% of U.S.-held land to Japan and building six new helipads at Camp Gonsalves in the Northern Training Area. The project had been on hold due to protests until new construction of the pads was resumed by Japan's Government in mid-2016.

Originally scheduled for December 2008, a fifty-one percent land reversion of the Jungle Warfare Training Center to the Government of Japan was started in 2016. This reversion was not unconditional; conditions for the reversion included building new and expanding existing landing zones in Kunigami and Higashi.

In December 2016, the largest return of land to civilian use since 1972 took place when the U.S. took possession of the new landing pads and returned 9,852 acres (3,987 hectares) of land it had held since the Second World War. However, "while Tokyo says the reversion will mitigate the burden of Okinawans, critics disagree, saying the deal involves what the U.S. military has called "unusable land" in exchange for new helipads.", according to the Japan Times, who insisted that "from the beginning, the reversion process met fierce opposition from local residents and environmental groups, who cite noise and environmental impact on the forested Yanbaru region."

== Military training ==
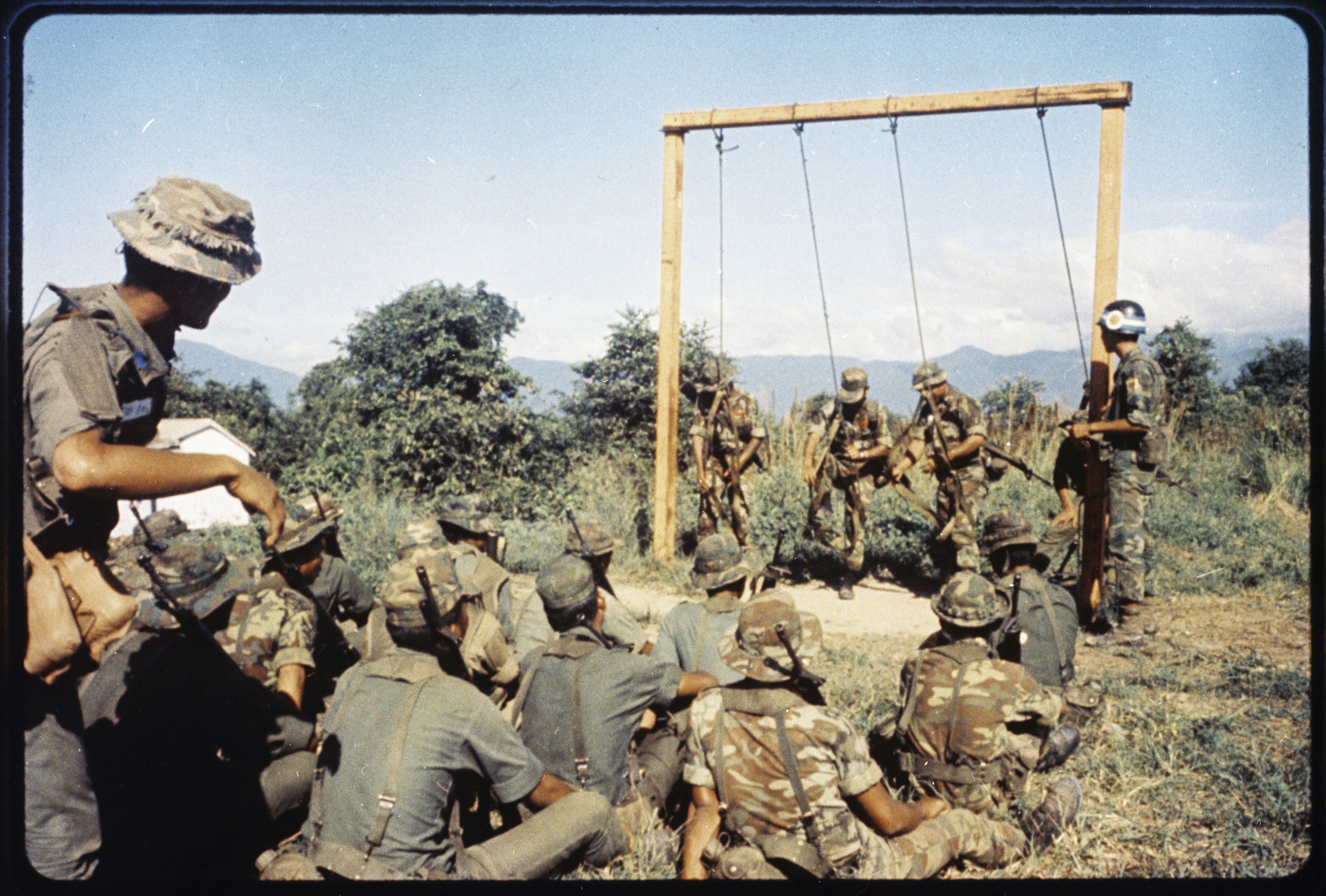
Training of counterinsurgency forces, Northern Training Area, Okinawa, December 1971

A new counterinsurgency school opened in Okinawa in May 1961. Marines had been training for anti-guerrilla operations in the Northern Training Area of Okinawa since at least 1958. The Northern Training Area is operated as the Marine Corps Jungle Warfare Training Center. With the backing of the 3rd Marine Division, JWTC is in a transition to becoming a TECOM (Training and Education Command) school.

== See also ==
- British Army Training and Support Unit Belize, a British Army jungle warfare training site.
- British Army Jungle Warfare Training School, in Brunei.
- Jungle Operations Training Center (JOTC), located at Schofield Barracks in Hawaii is the US Army equivalent jungle warfare training site.

== Links ==
- "Premiere training ground lies in Okinawa's thick jungle". United States Marine Corps. 24 February 2004. Archived from the original on 27 June 2004.
- Bob Houlihan (August 2003). "Welcome to the Jungle.Flash". All Hands. US Navy.
- "In The Thick of It" (PDF). Marines Magazine. November 1988.
