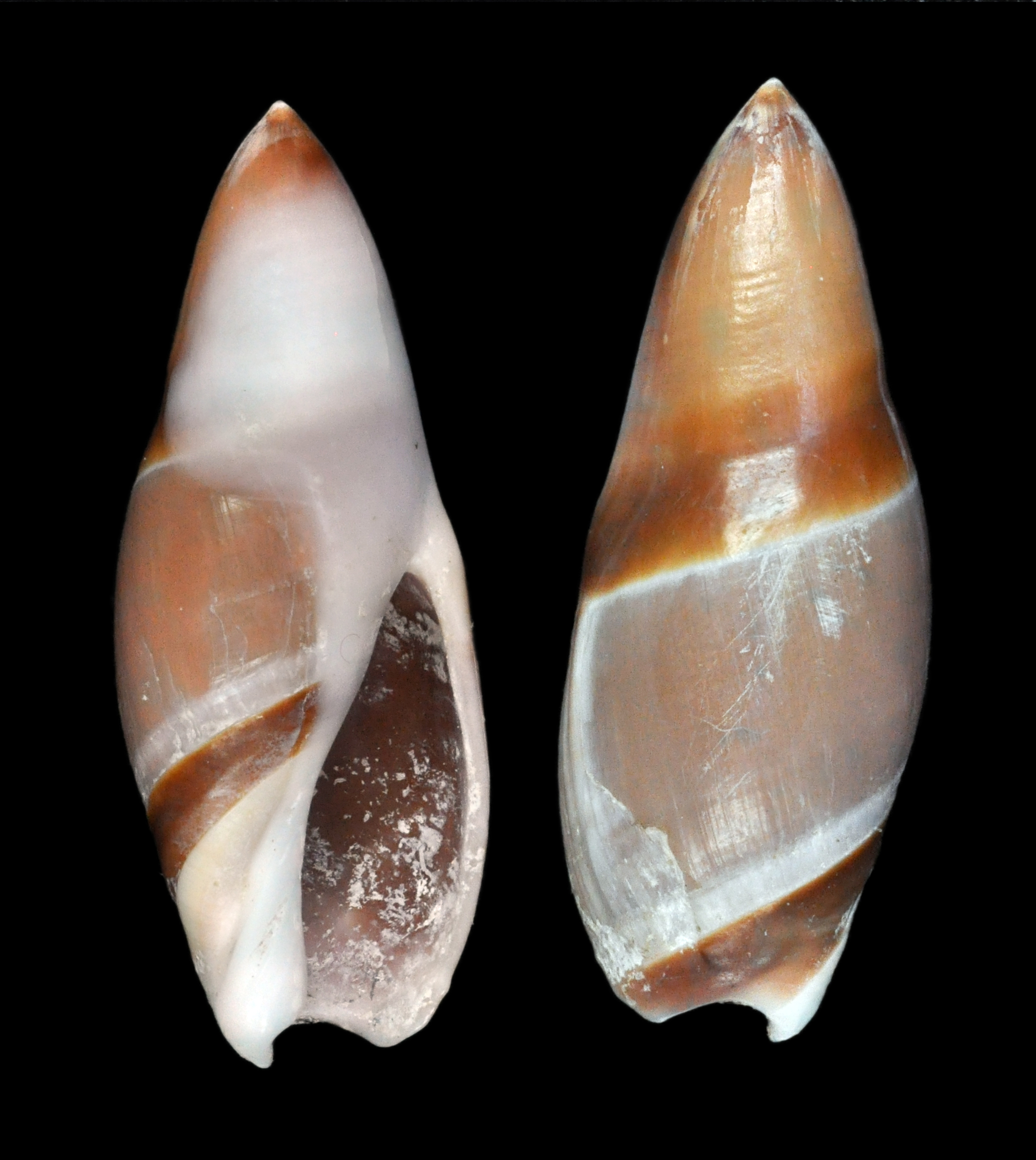
- Shell of Amalda hinomotoensis (specimen at MNHN, Paris)

Scientific classification
- Kingdom: Animalia
- Phylum: Mollusca
- Class: Gastropoda
- Subclass: Caenogastropoda
- Order: Neogastropoda
- Family: Ancillariidae
- Genus: Amalda
- Species: A. hayashii

Binomial name
- Amalda hayashii Ninomiya, 1988

Synonyms
- Amalda (Alocospira) hayashii Ninomiya, 1988 superseded combination

= Amalda hayashii =

Species of gastropod

Amalda hayashii is a species of sea snail, a marine gastropod mollusk in the family Ancillariidae, the olives.

== Description ==
The length of the shell attains 50 mm.

The shell is ovate-fusiform with a medium-high, weakly cyrtoconoid spire. The primary spire callus is thick and strongly pustulose, except on the smooth body whorl, covering all whorls except the protoconch tip, making measurements impossible. The secondary callus is relatively thin, with indistinct borders, micro-shagreened, and slightly glossy. It fuses seamlessly with the parietal callus and reaches the antepenultimate whorl, blending into the primary callus.

The plication plate ranges from nearly smooth to having up to five ridges, while the columella is either smooth or shows traces of plicae. The olivoid groove is shallow to very shallow, and the denticle of the outer lip is short, obtuse, and rounded. The anterior band is micro-shagreened, with the upper anterior band weakly convex and featuring an obtuse ridge either centrally located or shifted more abapically. The lower anterior band is flat.

The primary callus is yellow-brown on the spire and slightly darker toward the abapical region, bordered by an almost white, medium-width band. The secondary callus is whitish and translucent. The body whorl cloak is light chestnut with a slight purple tint, the olivoid band is whitish, the anterior band is brown, the lower anterior band is lighter, and the plication plate is creamy.

== Distribution ==
The marine species occurs off Amami-Oshima Island, Japan.
