= Frosted myotis =

Conservation status
- Endangered (IUCN 3.1)

Scientific classification
- Kingdom: Animalia
- Phylum: Chordata
- Class: Mammalia
- Order: Chiroptera
- Family: Vespertilionidae
- Genus: Myotis
- Species: M. pruinosus

Binomial name
- Myotis pruinosus Yoshiyuki, 1971
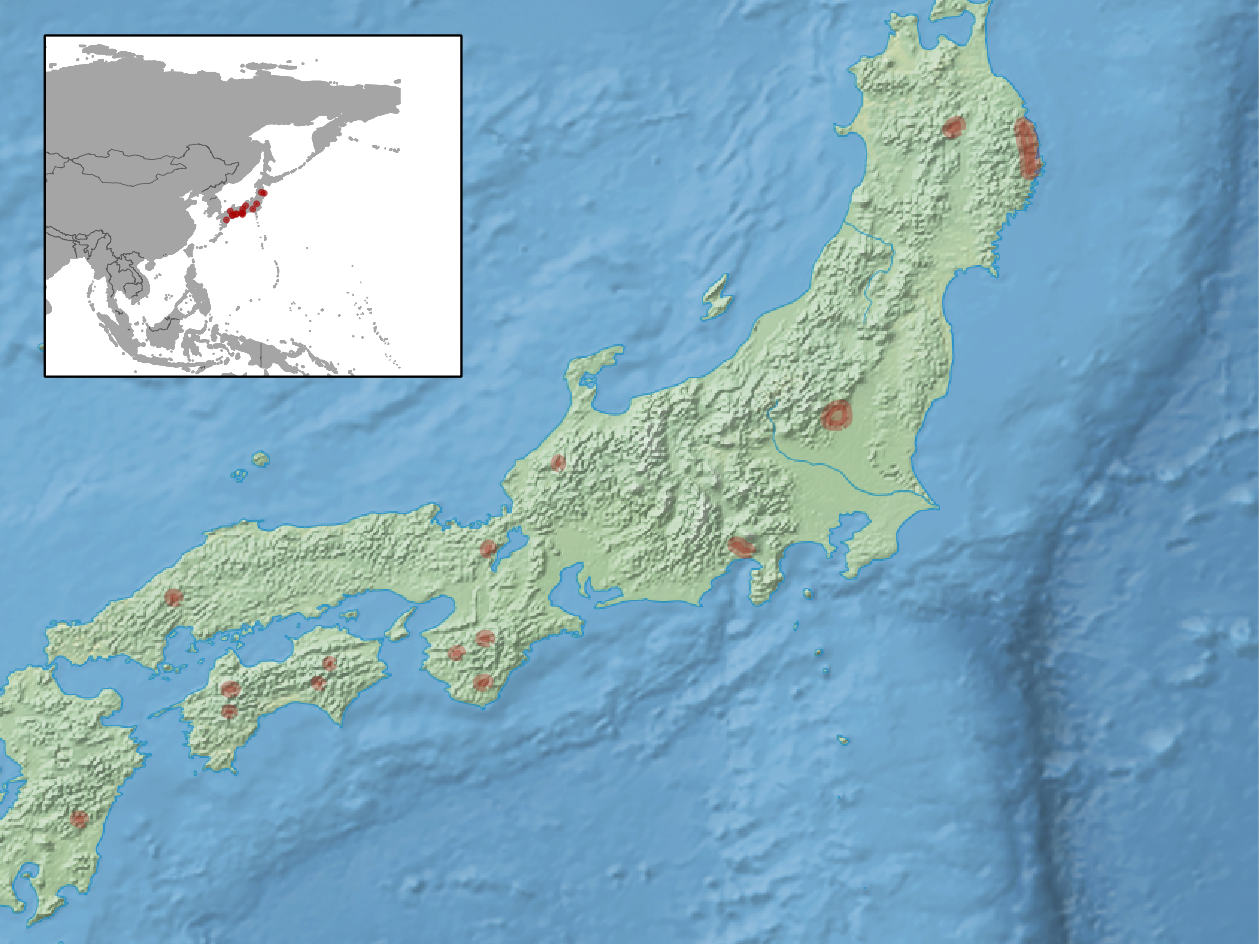

Species of bat

The frosted myotis (Myotis pruinosus) is a species of vesper bat. It is found only in Japan.

== Taxonomy ==
It was first discovered in August 1969 by Kimio Endo. In 1971, it was described by Mizuko Yoshiyuki. It is most closely related to the Yanbaru whiskered bat and the Burmese whiskered bat. Based on its similarity to these two species, it is hypothesized that the ancestor of the frosted myotis evolved to the south of Japan, and its range expanded northwards over time.

In Japanese it is known as クロホオヒゲコウモリ.

== Description ==
It is a small species of bat. Its forearm is only 30–33 mm (1.2–1.3 in) long. The fur of its back is brackish brown, with conspicuous frosted tips. The fur of its belly is lighter in color than the dorsal surface. The fur is velvety in texture, dense, and short, with individual hairs approximately 5.5 mm (0.22 in) long. Its wing membranes are dark brown. Their ears are narrow and short, with the tragus about half as high as the ear. Their dental formula is 2.1.3.33.1.3.3, for a total of 38 teeth.

== Biology ==
It roosts in tree hollows during the day. It is therefore dependent on large trees with hollows, and is not found in habitats where they aren't any. It is a diploid species, with two copies each of 22 chromosomes, for a total of 44 chromosomes.

== Range and habitat ==
It is found most often in mountain forests of lower elevations. It is encountered at elevations of 200–300 m (660–980 ft) above sea level. It has been recorded in the Honshu, Shikoku, and Kyushu islands of Japan.

== Conservation ==
It is currently evaluated as endangered by the IUCN. It meets the criteria to be listed as endangered because its extent of occurrence is less than 5,000 km^{2} (1,900 mi^{2}), its range is severely fragmented, and its habitat is projected to decline in extend and quality. It is believed that its population size is declining. Some of the main threats facing this species are habitat destruction and forest fragmentation.
