= Luciogobius pallidus =

Conservation status
- Data Deficient (IUCN 3.1)

Scientific classification
- Kingdom: Animalia
- Phylum: Chordata
- Class: Actinopterygii
- Order: Gobiiformes
- Family: Oxudercidae
- Genus: Luciogobius
- Species: L. pallidus

Binomial name
- Luciogobius pallidus Regan, 1940

Species of fish

Luciogobius pallidus is a species of goby endemic to Japan's fresh brackish underground waters near the coasts. It and close relative L. albus are the country's only known cavefish.
