= Yambaru =

Subtropical rainforest in Northern Okinawa

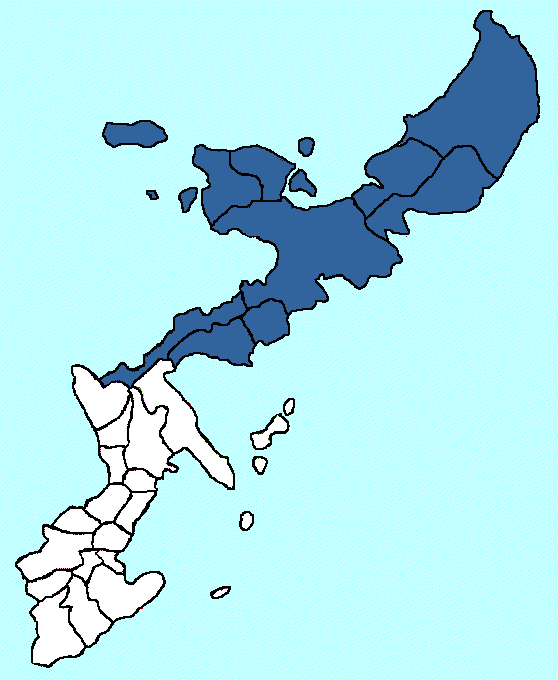
The Yambaru or Kunigami region of Okinawa, including the city of Nago and the Kunigami District

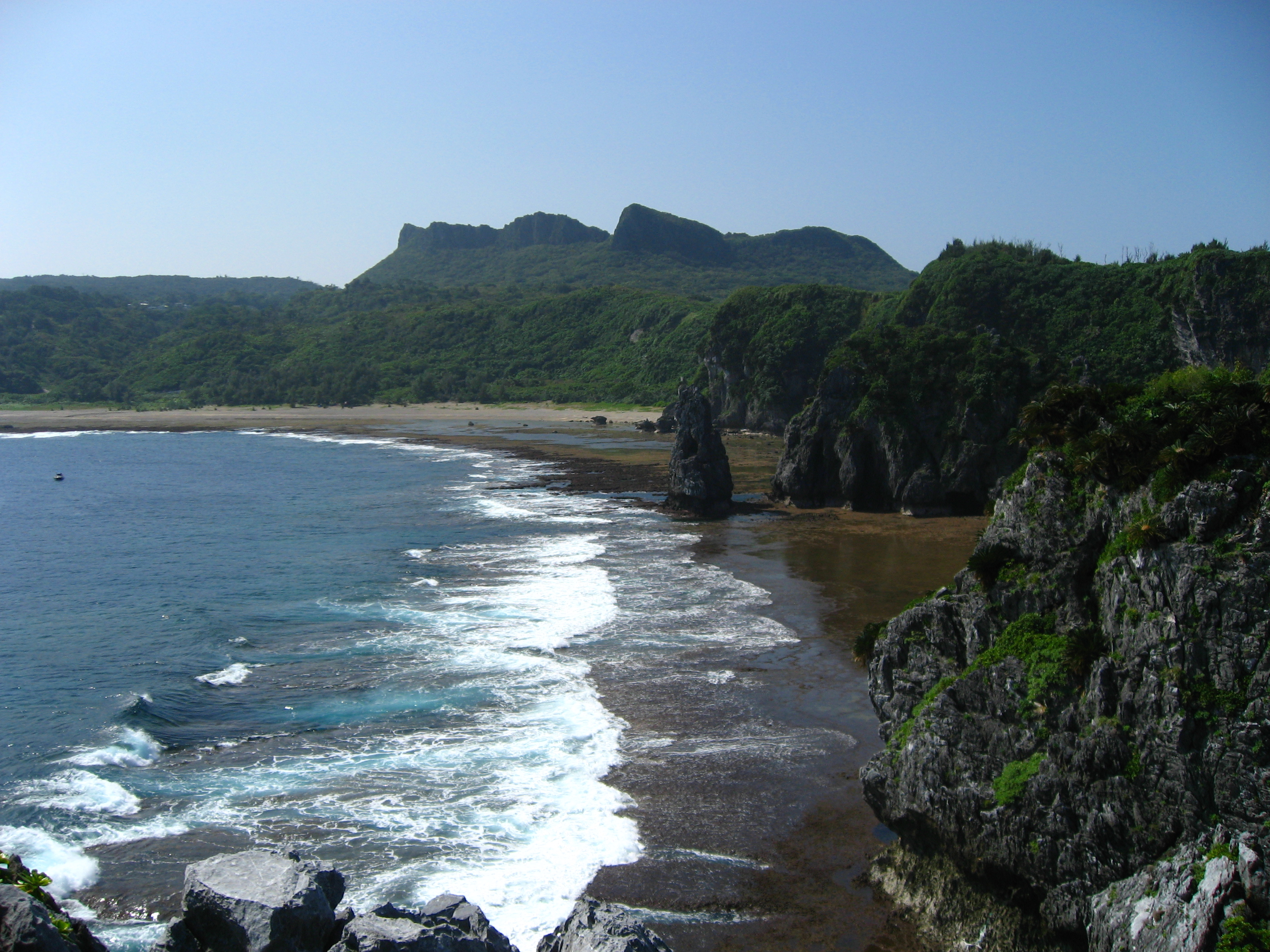
Kongōseki Mountains in Kunigami

Yambaru (山原) is the Okinawan and Kunigami name given to the forested northern part of Okinawa Island in Japan. Spanning the northern villages of Higashi, Kunigami, and Ōgimi, Yambaru contains some of the last large surviving tracts of subtropical rainforest in Asia, with many endemic species of flora and fauna. Many southerners fled to the area for refuge during the Battle of Okinawa. In 2016, Yambaru National Park was established and the area was included in a submission for inscription on the UNESCO World Heritage List.

Yambaru currently contains the 7,500 ha US Jungle Warfare Training Centre at Camp Gonsalves. As of 2010 there were twenty-two helipads in the training area with a further seven planned within two of the best preserved areas. Issues relating to the location of helipads delayed the designation as a National Park. Threatened by clearcutting and the removal of undergrowth, various endemic species are facing an imminent extinction crisis. The US Marine Corps has noted that 'to continue to perform realistic military training activities, these habitats must be maintained.'

== Biodiversity ==
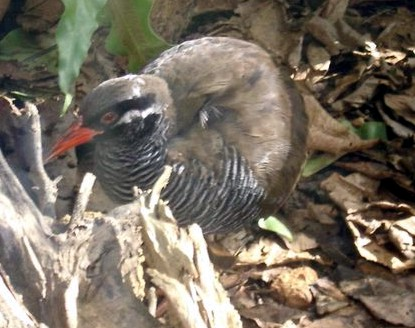
Okinawa rail

According to the WWF, Yambaru is the habitat of over four thousand species, with eleven animals and twelve plants bizarre to the area. Many of these are threatened species on the IUCN Red List and 177 feature on the Red List of the Ministry of the Environment. Rare species include the flightless Okinawa rail (Yambaru kuina in Japanese), Okinawa woodpecker (Special Natural Monument), Ryukyu robin, Amami woodcock, Ryukyu black-breasted leaf turtle, Anderson's crocodile newt, Ishikawa's frog, Holst's frog, Namiye's frog, Ryukyu long-tailed giant rat, and Muennink's spiny rat. All these species, with the exception of the Ryukyu robin, are classified as endangered; the Muennink's spiny rat, the Okinawa woodpecker, and Yambaru whiskered bat being critically endangered.

== Conservation and tourism ==
The Yambaru Wildlife Conservation Centre (Ufugi Nature Museum) (やんばる野生生物保護センター (ウフギー自然館)) opened in 1999 to increase understanding of the area; in 2010 it reopened after renovation. The area is being promoted by Okinawa Prefecture for ecotourism.

== See also ==
- Okinawa Yambaru Seawater Pumped Storage Power Station
- Issue of US bases in Okinawa
- Ryūkyū Kingdom
- National Parks in Japan
- World Heritage Sites in Japan
- Ogasawara Islands
