= Luciogobius albus =

Conservation status
- Critically Endangered (IUCN 3.1)

Scientific classification
- Kingdom: Animalia
- Phylum: Chordata
- Class: Actinopterygii
- Order: Gobiiformes
- Family: Oxudercidae
- Genus: Luciogobius
- Species: L. albus

Binomial name
- Luciogobius albus Regan, 1940

Species of fish

Luciogobius albus is a species of goby endemic to Japan where it is found in fresh and brackish underground waters near the coasts. This species and its close relative L. pallidus are the only known cavefish in Japan.
