= Yambaru National Park =

National park in the Okinawa Prefecture, Japan

Yanbaru National Park
- やんばる国立公園
- IUCN category II (national park)
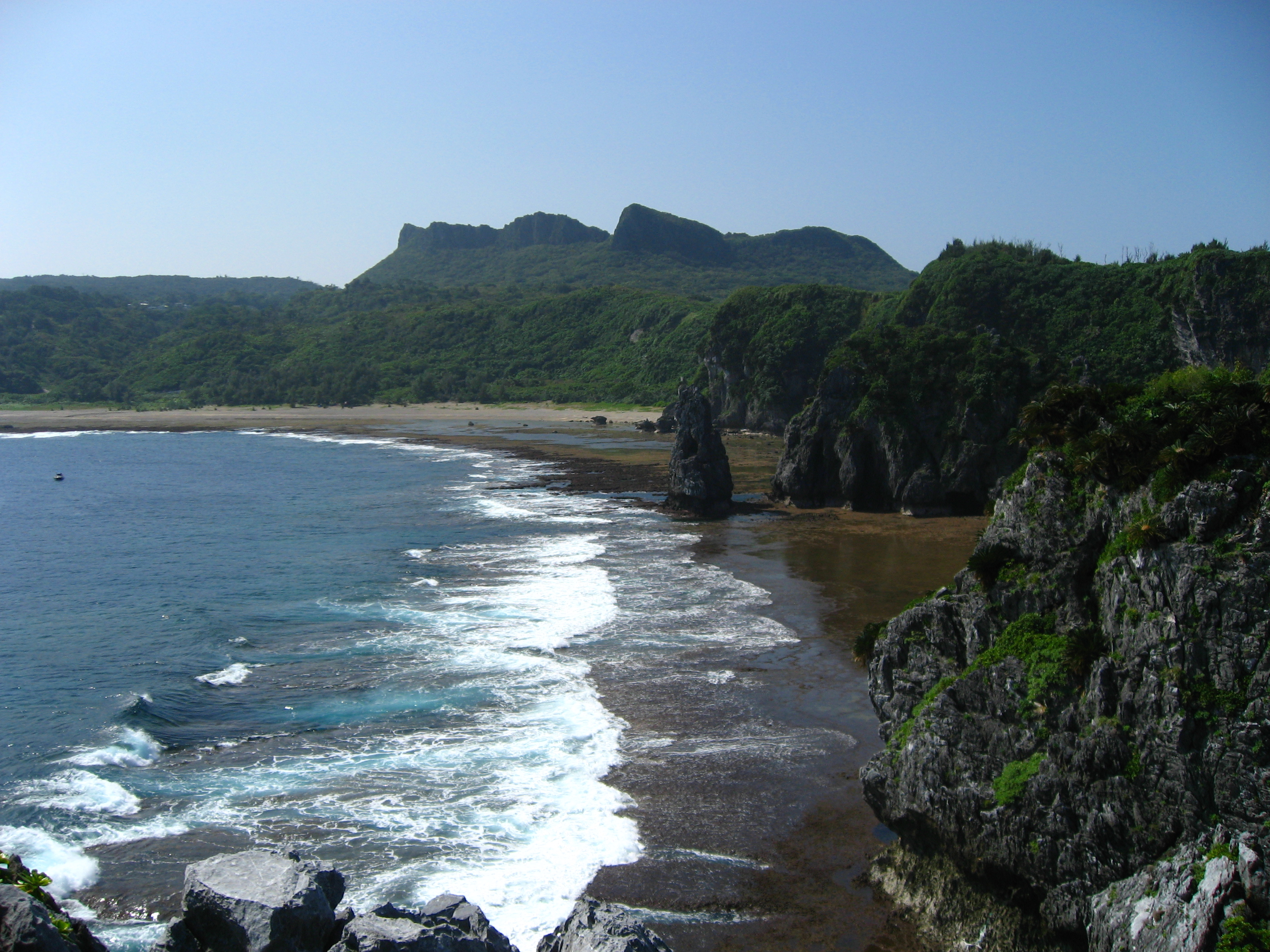

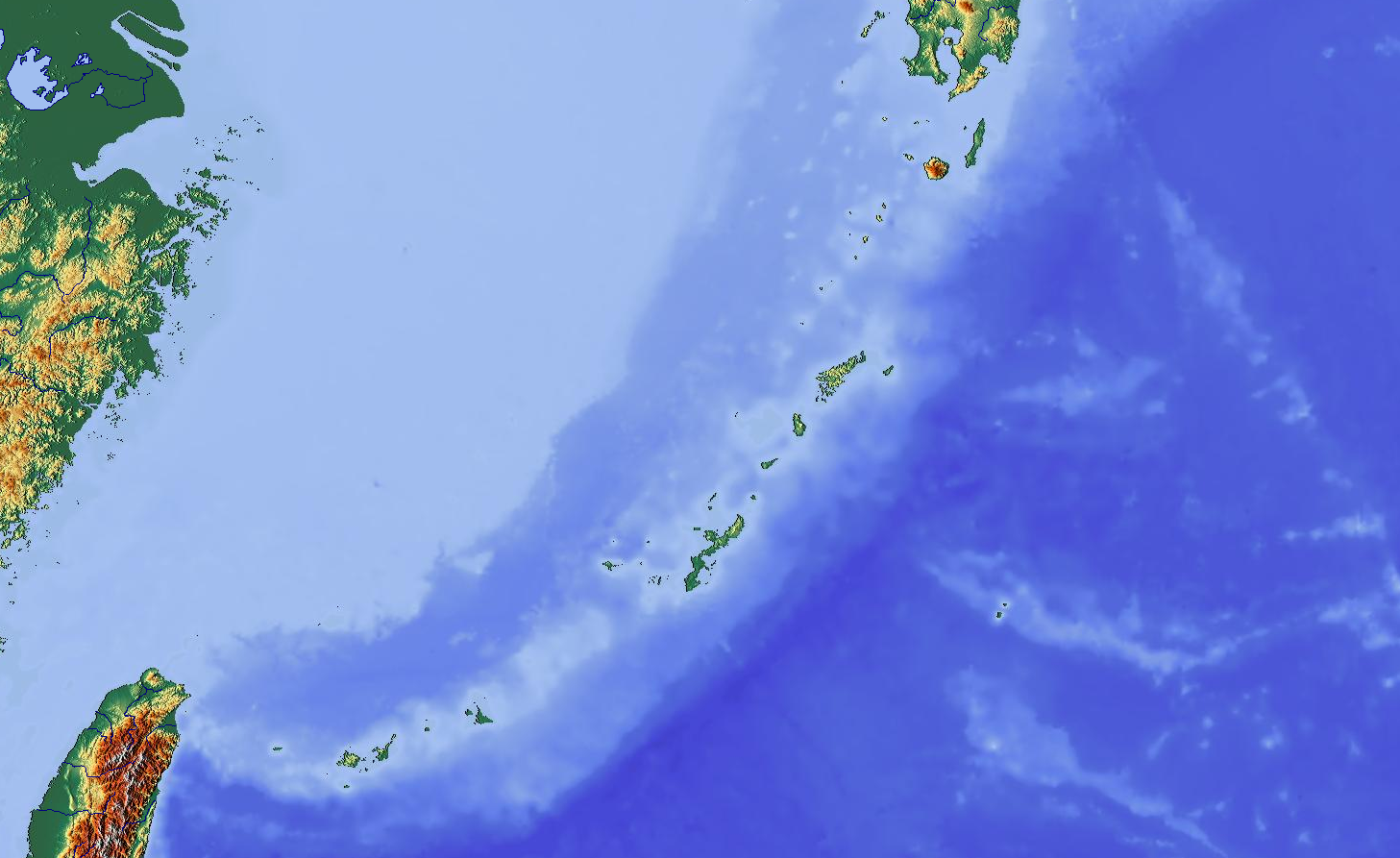
- Location within Ryukyu Islands Location within Japan
- Location: Yanbaru, Okinawa, Japan
- Coordinates: 26°48′21″N 128°15′57″E
- Area: 173.52 km^{2} (67.00 sq mi)
- Established: 15 September 2016
- Governing body: Ministry of the Environment (Japan)

UNESCO World Heritage Site
- Part of: Amami-Ōshima Island, Tokunoshima Island, northern part of Okinawa Island, and Iriomote Island
- Criteria: Natural: x
- Reference: 1574-004
- Inscription: 2021 (44th Session)

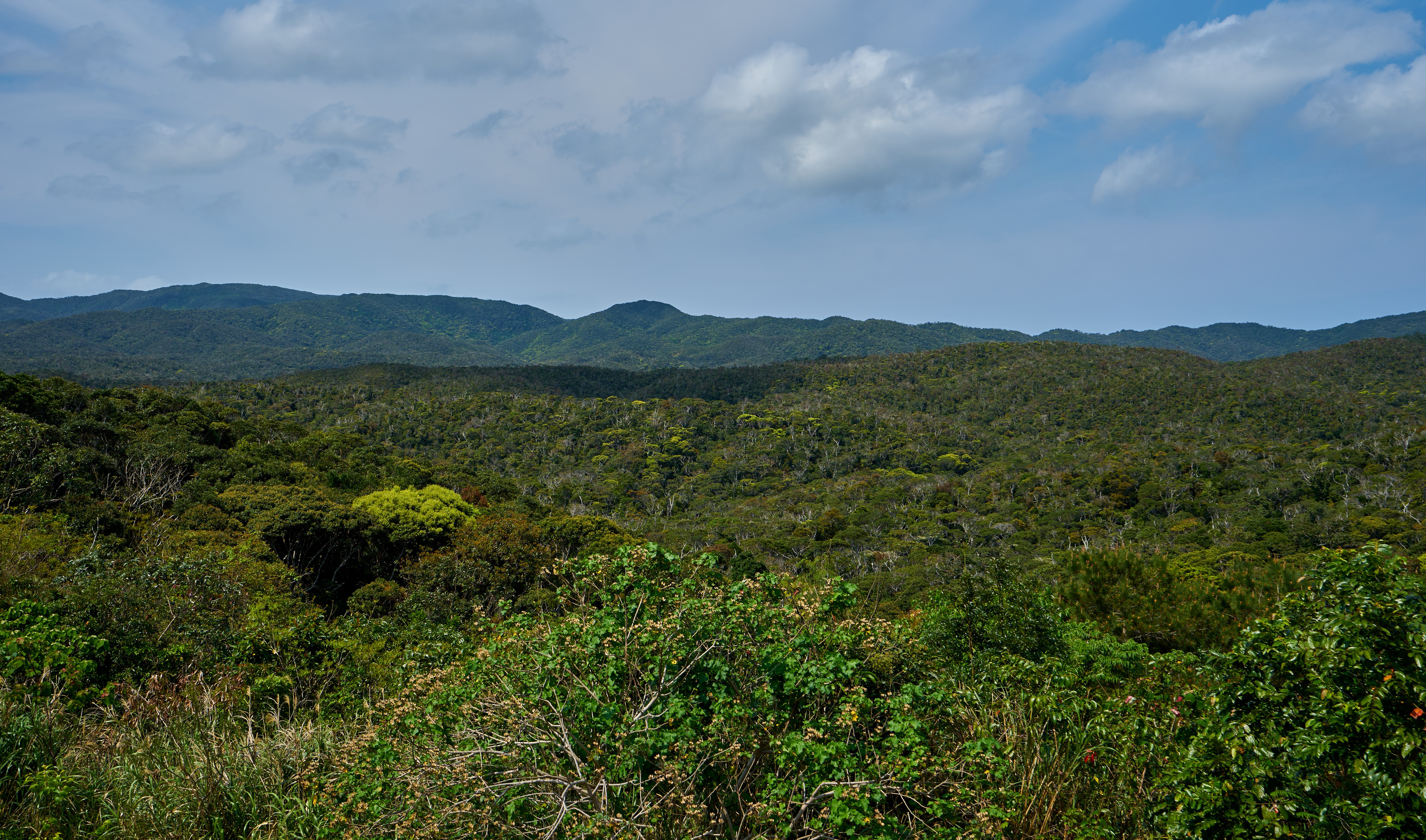
Subtropical evergreen laurel forest of Yanbaru

Yambaru National Park (やんばる国立公園, Yanbaru Kokuritsu Kōen) is a national park in Okinawa Prefecture, Japan. Established in 2016, it is located in and around the forested region of Yambaru at the northern end of Okinawa Island. The park comprises a land area of 13,622 ha (33,660 acres) in the villages of Kunigami, Ōgimi, and Higashi together with 3,670 ha (9,100 acres) of the surrounding waters. The day of establishment, 15 September, coincides with the anniversary of the 1983 discovery of the endangered endemic Yambaru long-armed scarab beetle (Cheirotonus jambar) (ヤンバルテナガコガネ).

== Future plans ==
Future extension of the Park is contingent upon the reversion of land currently occupied by the US military as the Northern Training Area. The northern part of Okinawa Island that corresponds with Yambaru was in 2016 submitted for inscription on the UNESCO World Heritage List as part of the serial nomination Amami-Ōshima Island, Tokunoshima Island, northern part of Okinawa Island, and Iriomote Island. In 2021 was inscribed to World Heritage List.

== See also ==
- List of national parks of Japan
- List of Natural Monuments of Japan (Okinawa)
- List of World Heritage Sites in Japan
