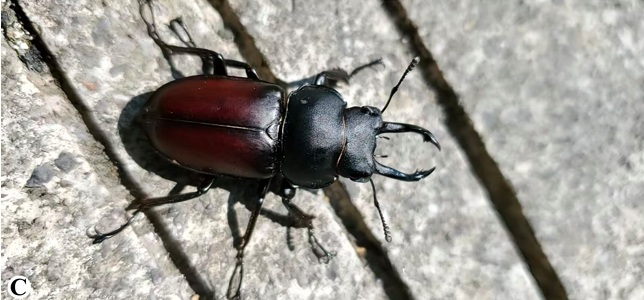

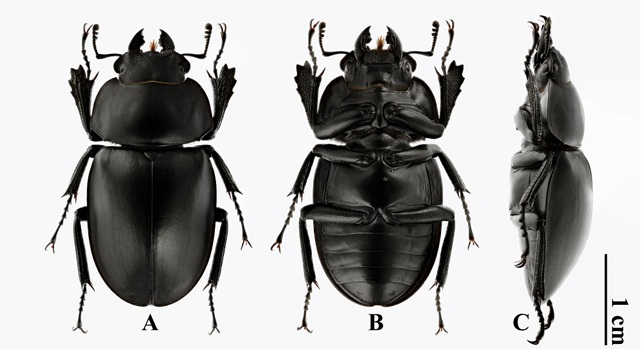

Scientific classification
- Domain: Eukaryota
- Kingdom: Animalia
- Phylum: Arthropoda
- Class: Insecta
- Order: Coleoptera
- Suborder: Polyphaga
- Infraorder: Scarabaeiformia
- Family: Lucanidae
- Genus: Neolucanus
- Species: N. yemaoi

Binomial name
- Neolucanus yemaoi Wang & He, 2024

Synonyms
- Neolucanus horizontalis Xin, Zhong & Qi, 2025

= Neolucanus yemaoi =

Species of beetle

Neolucanus yemaoi is a species of beetle of the Lucanidae family. This species is found in China (Yunnan).

Adults reach a length of 42.3 mm long and are mostly black, with the elytra blackish along the suture, the disc gradually changed from black at the base to rufous towards the apices. The body somewhat lustrous and glabrous. Some yellowish hairs are present on the mouthparts, anterior and posterior margins of the pronotum and legs.

== Etymology ==
The species is dedicated Mr. Mao Ye (Xiangyang, China), an enthusiastic amateur entomologist.
