= Yanbaru whiskered bat =

Conservation status
- Critically Endangered (IUCN 3.1)

Scientific classification
- Kingdom: Animalia
- Phylum: Chordata
- Class: Mammalia
- Infraclass: Placentalia
- Order: Chiroptera
- Family: Vespertilionidae
- Genus: Myotis
- Species: M. yanbarensis

Binomial name
- Myotis yanbarensis Maeda & Matsumura, 1998
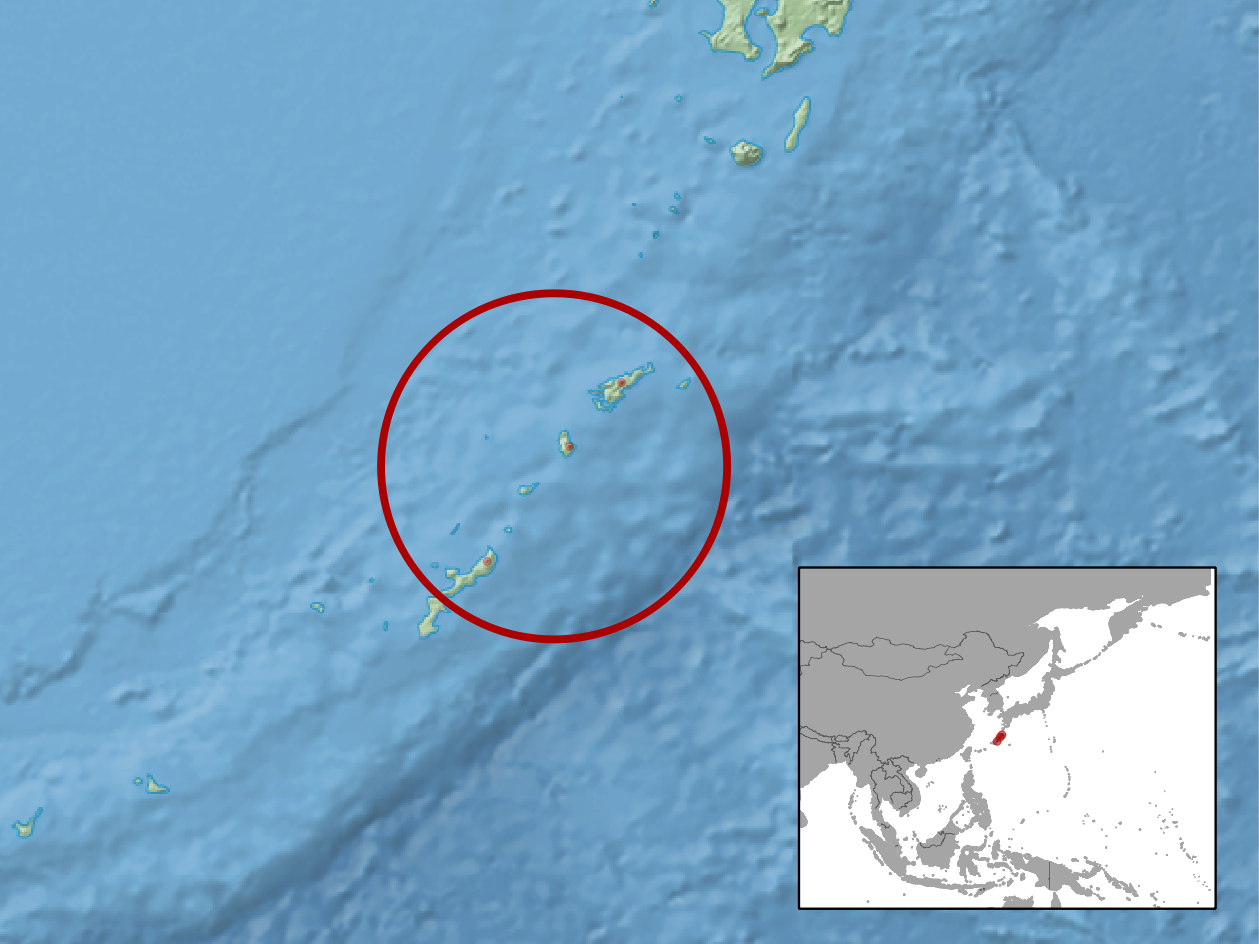

Species of bat

The Yanbaru whiskered bat (Myotis yanbarensis) is a species of vesper bat in the genus Myotis.

It is known only from three islands of the Ryukyu Archipelago, south of Japan, Okinawa (where the Yanbaru forest is situated), Amami Ōshima, and Tokunoshima. The species has been classified as Critically Endangered by the IUCN.

== Etymology and taxonomy ==
When described, it was placed into the subgenus Selysius, although some have argued that it is not a valid subgenus. It is closely related to the frosted myotis, which is found on mainland Japan. Its species name, yanbarensis, is a reference to Yanbaru, the forested part of northern Okinawa Island where this species is found.

== Description ==
Its dorsal hair, ears, and flight membranes are black. Its guard hairs are metallic silver at the tips. Its fur is overall soft and silky. Its snouts are long and horizontal. The uropatagium attaches to the first toe. The forearm is 36.5–37.5 mm (1.44–1.48 in) long. Its ears are 14 mm (0.55 in). Its tragi are 7 mm (0.28 in), and taper gradually at the tip. The braincase is small relative to its skull.

== Range and habitat ==
It is only found in the fragments of mature forest remaining on Okinawa Island, Tokunoshima, and Amami Ōshima. On Okinawa Island, it is found on United States military property. On Amami Ōshima, its habitat occurs within Amami Guntō Quasi-National Park. During the day, it roosts in hollow trees.

== Conservation ==
This species was evaluated for the first time by the IUCN in 2000, when it was described as data deficient. It was listed as critically endangered in 2008, which was maintained in the 2019 evaluation. It is listed as critically endangered because it only occurs on three islands, its extent of occurrence is less than 100 km^{2} (39 mi^{2}), and its habitat size and quality is being lost. Deforestation is a major threat to its continued existence.

== See also ==
- Yanbaru
