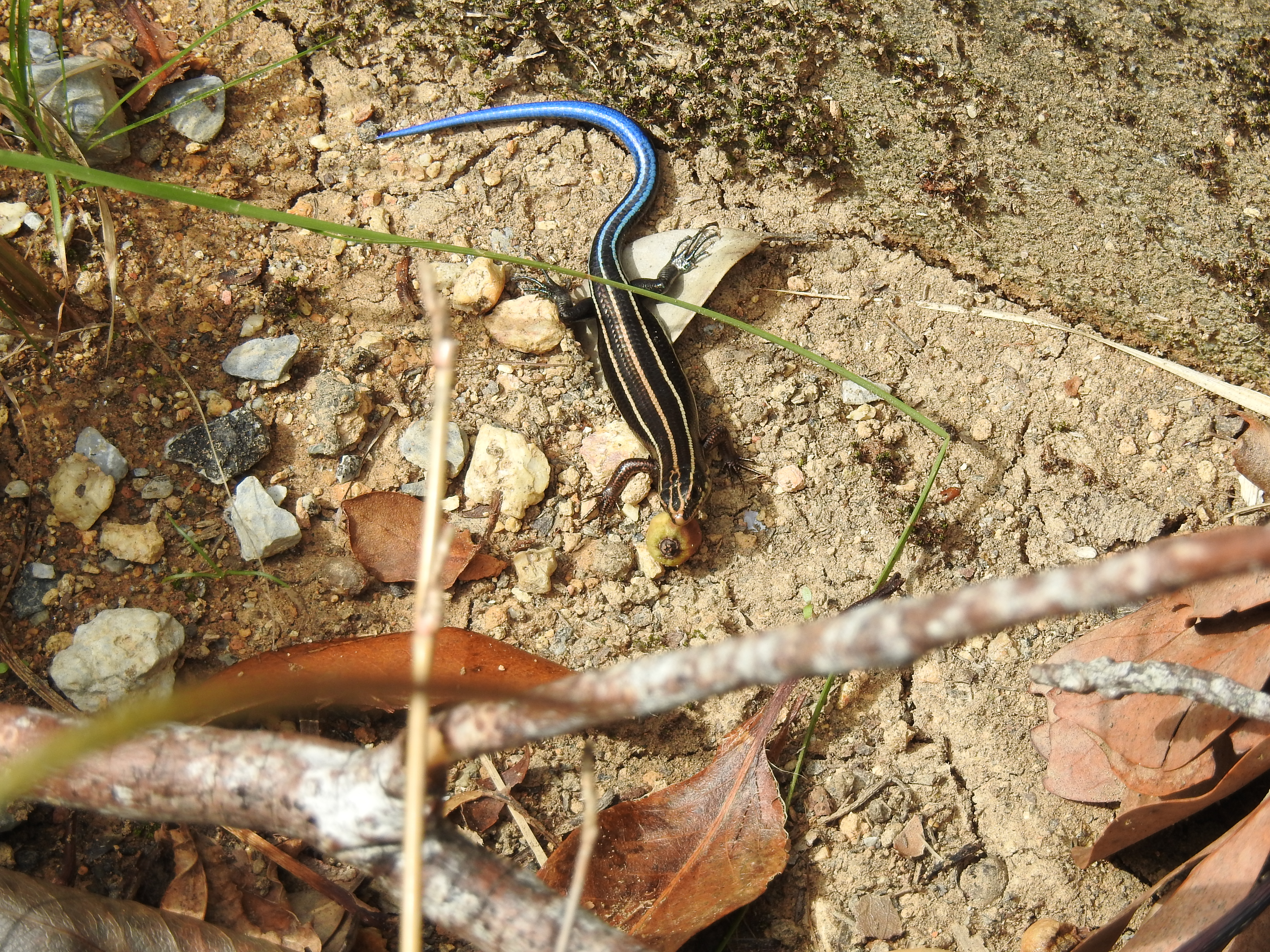

Conservation status
- Vulnerable (IUCN 3.1)

Scientific classification
- Kingdom: Animalia
- Phylum: Chordata
- Class: Reptilia
- Order: Squamata
- Family: Scincidae
- Genus: Plestiodon
- Species: P. barbouri

Binomial name
- Plestiodon barbouri (Van Denburgh, 1912)

Synonyms
- Eumeces barbouri Van Denburgh, 1912; Plestiodon barbouri — Schmitz, Mausfeld & Embert, 2004

= Plestiodon barbouri =

Species of reptile

Plestiodon barbouri, also known commonly as Barbour's blue-tailed skink and Barbour's eyelid skink, is a species of lizard in the family Scincidae. The species is endemic to the Ryukyu Islands (Japan).

== Etymology ==
The specific name, barbouri, is in honor of American herpetologist Thomas Barbour.

== Geographic range ==
P. barbouri is found on the Amami Islands and the Okinawa Islands in the Ryukyu Archipelago of Japan.

== Habitat ==
The preferred natural habitats of P. barbouri are forest and shrubland.

== Reproduction ==
The mode of reproduction of P. barbouri is unknown.
