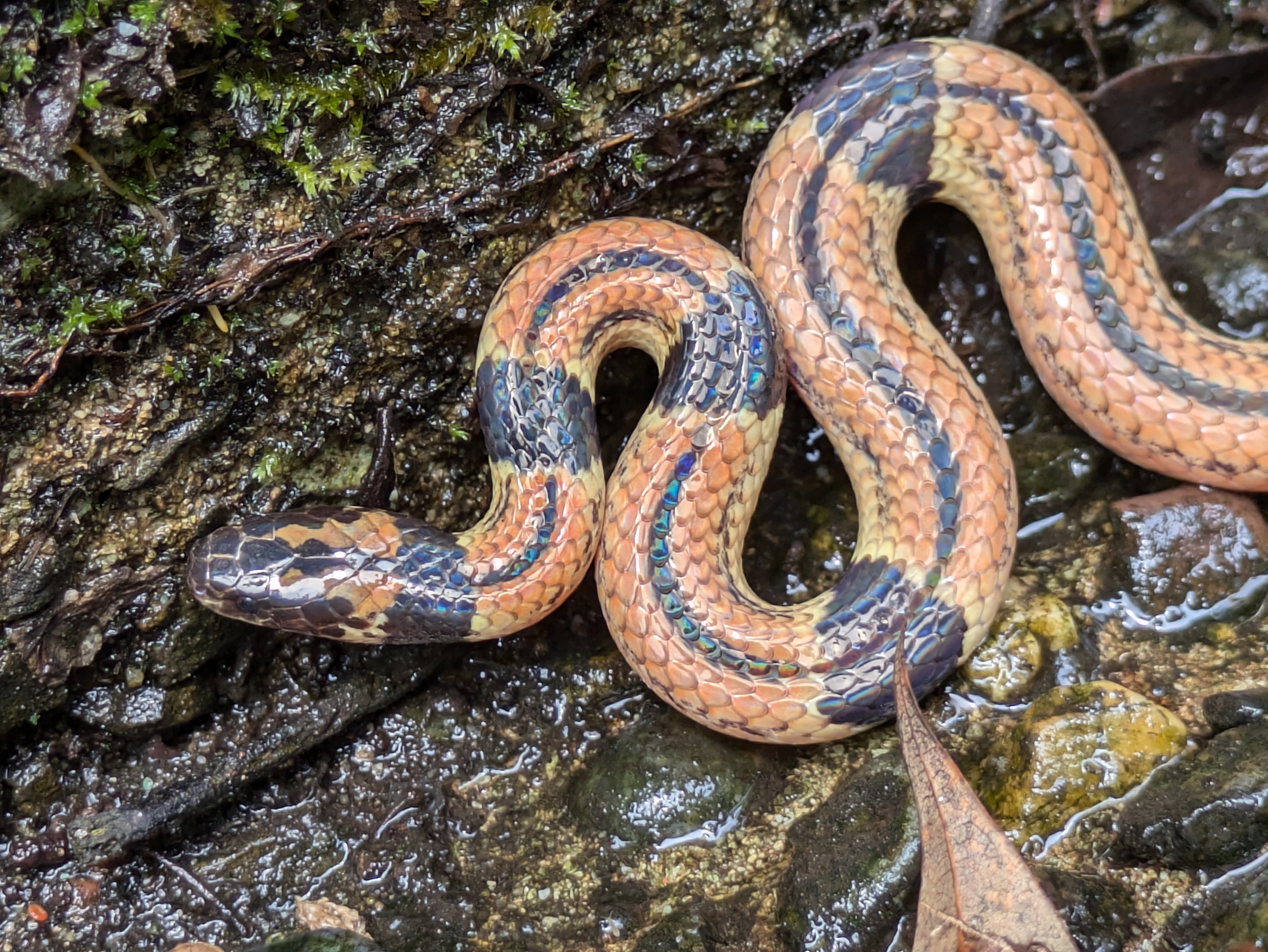

Conservation status
- Least Concern (IUCN 3.1)

Scientific classification
- Kingdom: Animalia
- Phylum: Chordata
- Class: Reptilia
- Order: Squamata
- Suborder: Serpentes
- Family: Elapidae
- Genus: Sinomicrurus
- Species: S. japonicus

Binomial name
- Sinomicrurus japonicus (Günther, 1868)

= Sinomicrurus japonicus =

Species of snake

Sinomicrurus japonicus, the Japanese coral snake (ヒャン, in Japanese), is a species of snake of the family Elapidae.

The snake is found in Amami Oshima Is., Japan.
