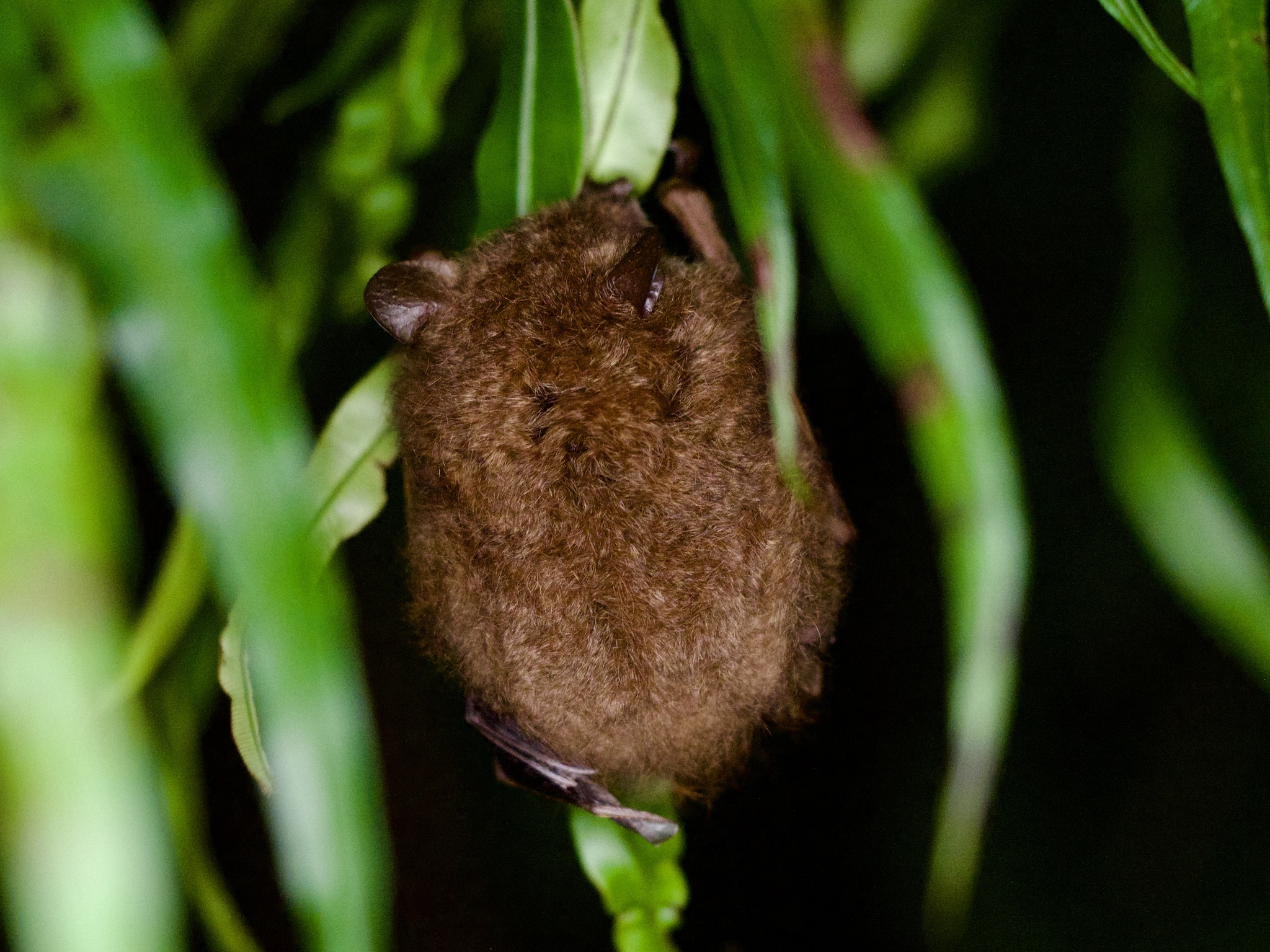

Conservation status
- Endangered (IUCN 3.1)

Scientific classification
- Kingdom: Animalia
- Phylum: Chordata
- Class: Mammalia
- Infraclass: Placentalia
- Order: Chiroptera
- Family: Vespertilionidae
- Genus: Murina
- Species: M. ryukyuana

Binomial name
- Murina ryukyuana Maeda & Matsumura, 1998

= Ryukyu tube-nosed bat =

Species of bat

The Ryukyu tube-nosed bat (Murina ryukyuana) is a small, plant-roosting species of bat in the family Vespertilionidae. It is endemic to three islands of the central Ryukyus (Okinawa, Tokunoshima, and Amami-Ōshima) and is listed as Endangered by both the IUCN and Japan's Ministry of the Environment.

== Taxonomy and etymology ==
Murina ryukyuana was described in 1998 based on specimens from northern Okinawa. Its specific epithet refers to the Ryukyu Archipelago.

== Description ==
Murina ryukyana has rounded ears that are 35.5 to 37 mm (1.40 to 1.46 in) with tragi that are 9.5 to 10.5 mm (0.37 to 0.41 in). It has straight hair in shades of brown, with dorsal hairs longer than its ventral hairs.

== Distribution and habitat ==
The bat is found only in the subtropical evergreen broad-leaf forests of Okinawa Island, Tokunoshima, and Amami-Ōshima.

== Ecology and behavior ==
=== Roosting ===
Radio-tracking reveals strong reliance on plant roosts throughout the year. Non-reproductive individuals usually roost singly, mainly in understory foliage. Maternity roosts occur both in foliage roosts and small tree cavities, but are more likely to occur in older forest stands and tend to be higher off the ground. Roost switching is frequent (mean stay 1.6 days), and the maximum roost-switch distance recorded is 179 m.

=== Foraging and diet ===
Although its diet has not been analyzed, morphology and very faint, steep frequency-modulated echolocation calls (peak ≈ 60 kHz) suggest prey capture by gleaning or short-range hawking inside clutter.

Social calls have been recorded far more often than feeding buzzes, indicating a possibly important communicative repertoire and either greater reliance on listening for prey or very soft feeding buzzes.

=== Reproduction ===
Pregnant females have been captured from late April to early July. Maternity colonies of 2–15 (maximum 16) individuals persist until at least November.

=== Echolocation ===
Search-phase calls are short FM sweeps with peak frequency 61.5士4.67 kHz on Amami-Ōshima and 59.9士6.61 kHz on Tokunoshima.

== Conservation ==
=== Status and threats ===
Forest loss is the primary threat. Old-growth stands may be particularly important because of their seeming importance for maternity colonies. Understory foliage removal may reduce the roosting habitat of this species or harm roosting individuals.

=== Recommended actions ===
Since other threats have not been identified, forest protection is the primary conservation method recommended. Where pure forest preservation is not possible, the following approaches are recommended to mitigate the potential impacts of timber harvesting: (1) retaining understory vegetation, (2) preserving trees along streams, (3) maintaining high cavity densities by protecting old trees and snags, and (4) avoiding tree removal between April and July (pupping season).
