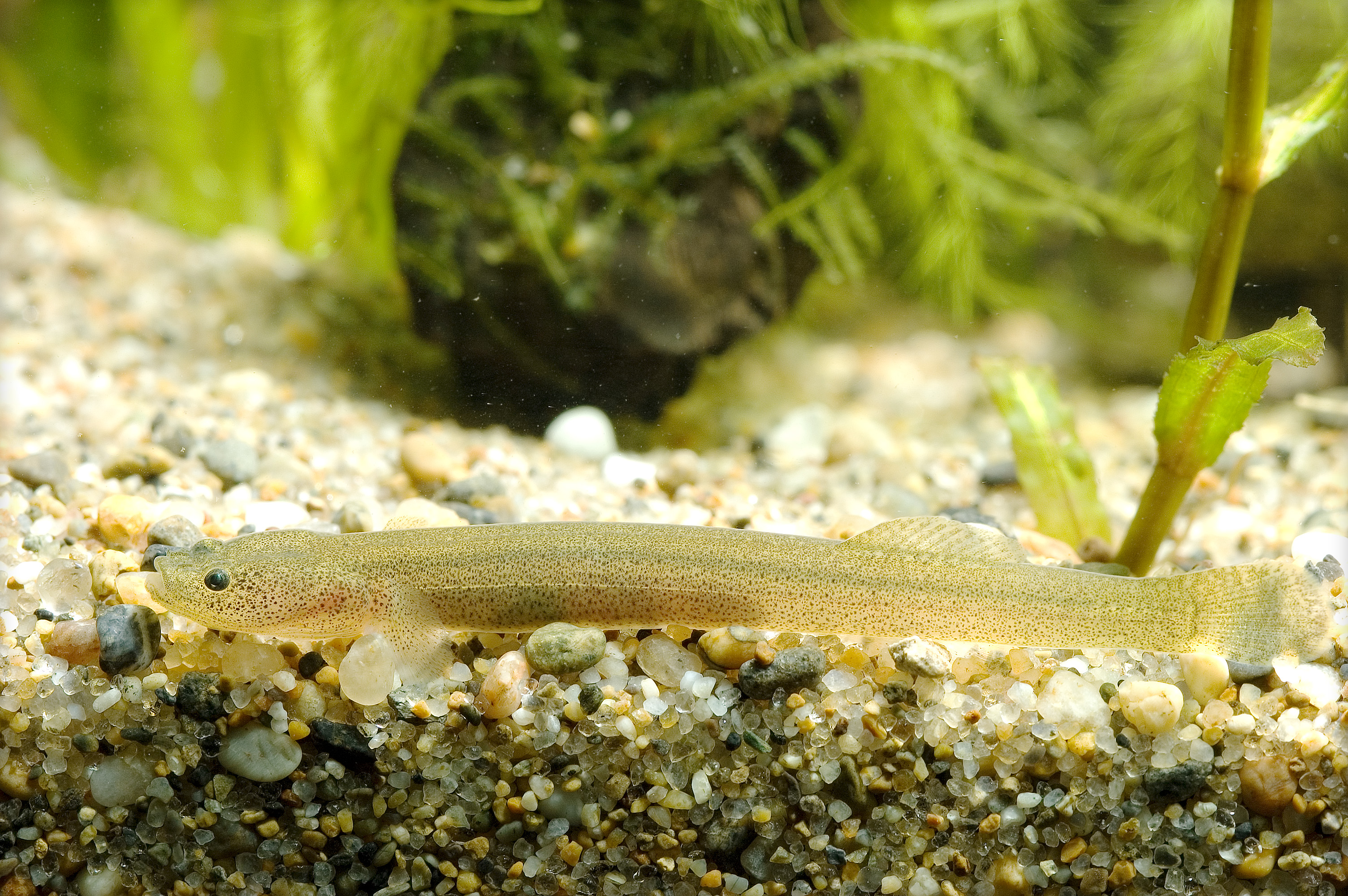
- Luciogobius guttatus

Scientific classification
- Kingdom: Animalia
- Phylum: Chordata
- Class: Actinopterygii
- Order: Gobiiformes
- Family: Oxudercidae
- Subfamily: Gobionellinae
- Genus: Luciogobius; T. N. Gill, 1859

Type species
- Luciogobius guttatus T. N. Gill, 1859

Synonyms
- Expedio Snyder, 1909

= Luciogobius =

Genus of fishes

Luciogobius is a genus of goby in the subfamily of Oxudercidae, commonly called worm gobies. It is distributed along the coast of northeastern Asia, where species can be found in Korea, China, Taiwan, Vietnam, and Japan. Most species occur in Japan, and several are endemic.

These gobies are unusual in appearance and habitat preference. They are relatively small fish, about 2 to 14 cm (0.8–5.5 in) long, with very elongated bodies. The vertebral column is flexible and finely segmented, with many more vertebrae than most other fish in the family; they have up to 50 vertebrae, whereas most gobies have about 26. This extra-segmented spine helps Luciogobius species burrow in their common habitat, gravel beaches. Most vertebrates would have difficulty living in gravel that is constantly stirred by tidal action, but the flexibility of the bodies of Luciogobius is likely an adaptation to this environment. They also lack scales and the first dorsal fin. Two species, L. albus and L. pallidus, are cave-adapted and live in anchialine waters.

Other habitat types occupied by species in the genus include estuaries, freshwater streams, and in the case of L. adapel, the seafloor up to 50 m (160 ft).

Most of the species studied spawn in the intertidal zone, but one species has been observed spawning in freshwater rivers. The eggs are generally attached to the undersides of rocks or are buried in the gravel or stone substrate.

== Species ==
These are the currently recognized species in this genus. There are many more species known that are still undescribed, for a probable total of around 40 species. Those species are usually divived into 5 subdivision

The described species are:

Luciogobius gutattus complex

- Luciogobius guttatus T. N. Gill, 1859 (flat-headed goby)
- Luciogobius martellii Di Caporiacco, 1948
- Luciogobius brevipterus J. S. T. F. Chen, 1932
- Luciogobius ryukyuensis I. S. Chen, T. Suzuki & Senou, 2008
- Luciogobius dongyinensis Chen, Shao, Chou, Chen & Chan, 2024 - Dongyin earthworm goby
- Luciogobius yubai Ikeda, Tamada & Hirashima, 2019
- Luciogobius newtaipeiensis Chen, Ren, Jiang, Wang & Chang, 2024
- Luciogobius matsuensis Chen, Shao, Chou, Chen & Chan, 2024 - Matsu earthworm goby

Luciogobius pallidus complex A group of Luciogobius that dwell in the vicinity of subterranean river

- Luciogobius pallidus Regan, 1940
- Luciogobius albus Regan, 1940

There is a ongoing debate of distinguishment between this species and L. fonticola.

- Luciogobius fluvialis Kanagawa, Itai & Senou, 2011
- Luciogobius fonticola Kanagawa, Itai & Senou, 2011
- Luciogobius dormitoris Shiogaki & Dotsu, 1976

There is a ongoing debate of distinguishment between this species and L. pallidus.

Luciogobius elongatus complex

- Luciogobius elongatus Regan, 1905
- Luciogobius parvulus (Snyder, 1909)
- Luciogobius adapel Okiyama, 2001

L. adapel is found from the deep seafloar, unlike other congeneric species.

- Luciogobius punctilineatus Koreeda & Motomura, 2022
- Luciogobius opisthoproctus Chen & Liao, 2024
- Luciogobius chaojinensis Chen, Ren, Jiang, Wang & Chang, 2024

Luciogobius grandis complex

- Luciogobius grandis R. Arai, 1970
- Luciogobius huatungensis Chen, Ren, Jiang, Wang & Chang, 2024

Luciogobius platycephalus complex

- Luciogobius platycephalus Shiogaki & Dotsu, 1976
- Luciogobius griseus Koreeda, Maeda & Motomura, 2023
