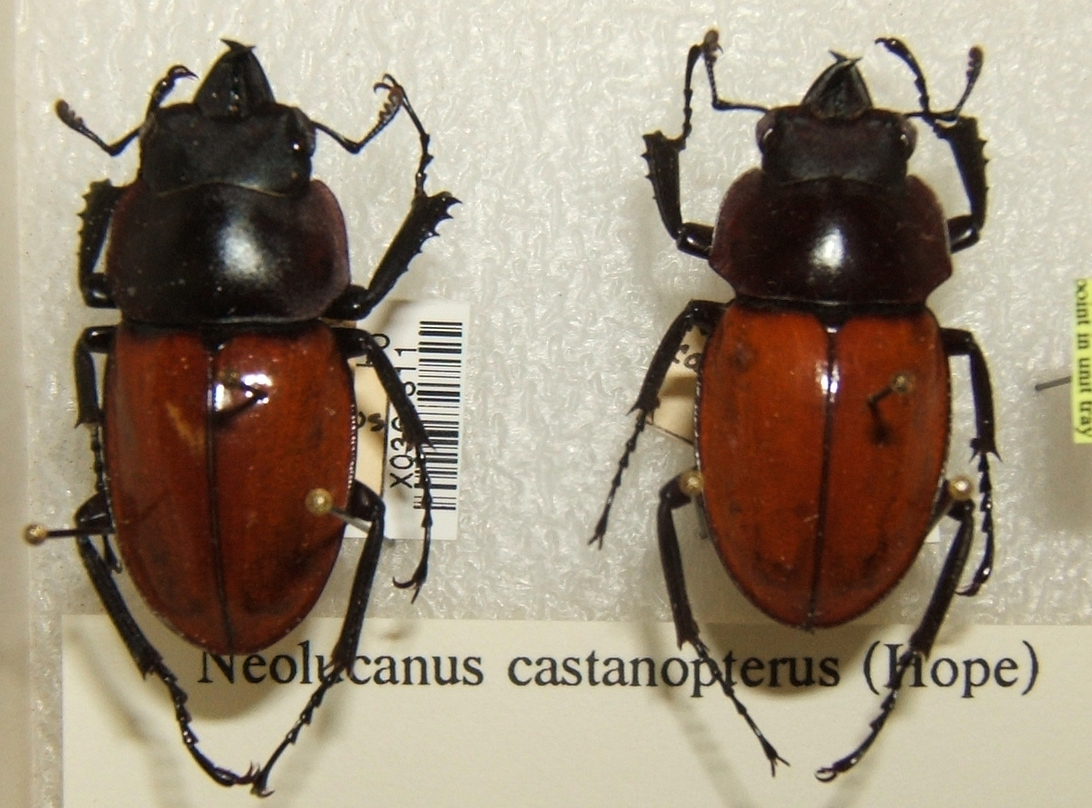
- Neolucanus castanopterus

Scientific classification
- Kingdom: Animalia
- Phylum: Arthropoda
- Clade: Pancrustacea
- Class: Insecta
- Order: Coleoptera
- Suborder: Polyphaga
- Infraorder: Scarabaeiformia
- Family: Lucanidae
- Subfamily: Lucaninae
- Genus: Neolucanus; Thomson, 1862

= Neolucanus =

Genus of insects

Neolucanus is a genus of beetles belonging to the family Lucanidae.

The species of this genus are found in Southeastern Asia.

Species:

- Neolucanus armatus Lacroix, 1972
- Neolucanus baladeva (Hope, 1842)
- Neolucanus baongocae Nguyen, 2013
- Neolucanus yemaoi Wang & He, 2024
