= Parkraemeria =

Scientific classification
- Kingdom: Animalia
- Phylum: Chordata
- Class: Actinopterygii
- Order: Gobiiformes
- Family: Gobiidae
- Genus: Parkraemeria; Whitley, 1951

Type species
- Parkraemeria ornata Whitley, 1951

Genus of fishes

Parkraemeria is a genus of gobies native to the western Pacific Ocean from the Ryukyus to Australia.

== Species ==
There are currently three recognized species in this genus:

- Parkraemeria ornata Whitley, 1951
- Parkraemeria rhinoceros T. Suzuki & Senou, 2013
- Parkraemeria saltator T. Suzuki & Senou, 2013
