= Muennink's spiny rat =

Conservation status
- Critically Endangered (IUCN 3.1)

Scientific classification
- Kingdom: Animalia
- Phylum: Chordata
- Class: Mammalia
- Order: Rodentia
- Family: Muridae
- Genus: Tokudaia
- Species: T. muenninki

Binomial name
- Tokudaia muenninki (Johnson, 1946)
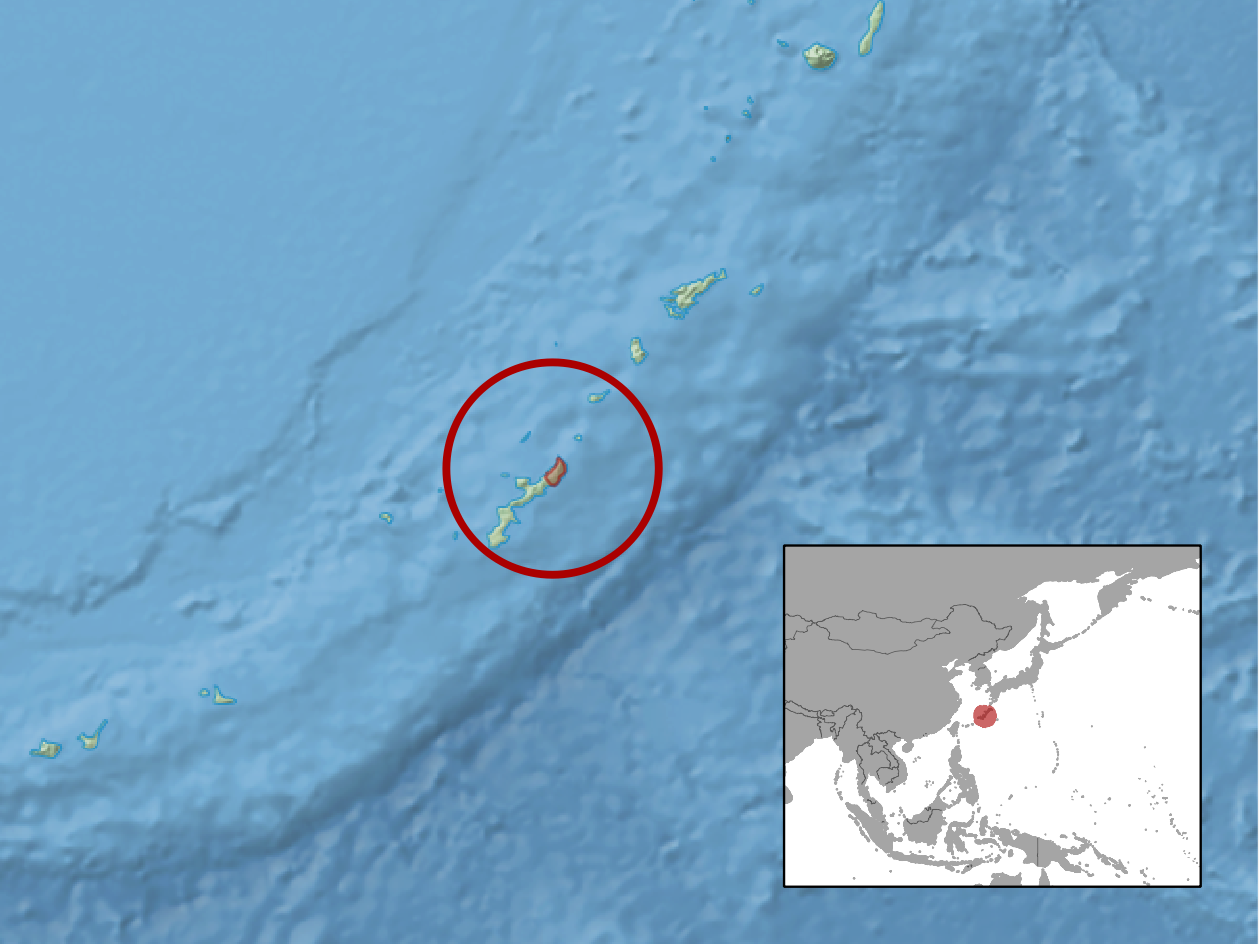

Species of rodent

Muennink's spiny rat or Okinawa spiny rat (Tokudaia muenninki, Japanese: オキナワトゲネズミ, romanized: Okinawa togenezumi or 沖縄棘鼠) is a species of rodent in the family Muridae. Endemic to Okinawa Island, Japan, its natural habitat is subtropical moist broadleaf forest. The karyotype has 2n = 44. Its sex chromosomes are abnormally large, while the other two species in Tokudaia have lost their Y chromosome. It is found only on the northern part (Yanbaru area) of the island, above 300 m, and is thought to inhabit an area of less than 3 km^{2}.

The head and body are up to 7 inches long with a 5-inch tail. They weigh up to 7 ounces. They have a short thick body and dense fur, consisting of fine hairs and coarse, grooved spines (hence the common name "spiny rat"). The fur is brownish above and grayish white below with a faint orange tinge. The spines on the animal's back are black throughout while the spines underneath are usually white with a reddish-brown tip. The spines cover the body except for the regions around the mouth, ears, feet and tail. The tail is bi-colored for its entire length.

The species is threatened by deforestation, predation by feral cats and introduced mongooses, and competition with introduced black rats. In March 2008, the first wild specimen in over 30 years was caught in the northern part of Okinawa.
