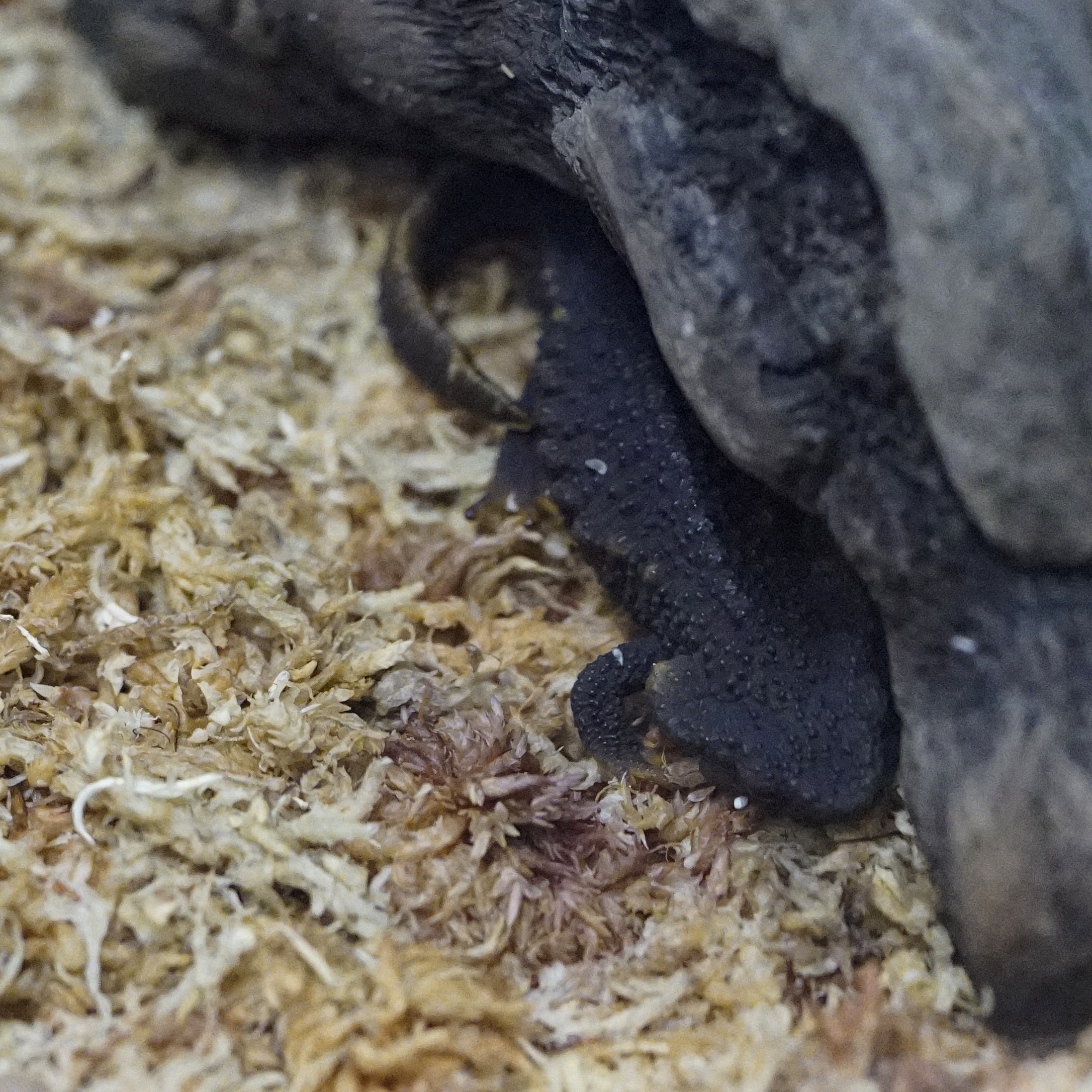

Conservation status
- Vulnerable (IUCN 3.1)

Scientific classification
- Kingdom: Animalia
- Phylum: Chordata
- Class: Amphibia
- Order: Urodela
- Family: Salamandridae
- Genus: Echinotriton
- Species: E. andersoni

Binomial name
- Echinotriton andersoni (Boulenger, 1892)

Synonyms
- Tylototriton andersoni Boulenger, 1892

= Anderson's crocodile newt =

Species of salamander

Anderson's crocodile newt, Anderson's newt, Ryukyu spiny newt, or Japanese warty newt (Echinotriton andersoni) is a species of salamander in the family Salamandridae found in the Ryukyu Islands of Japan, and, at least formerly, Mount Guanyin in northern Taiwan, where it is now believed to be extinct.

== Description ==
Echinotriton andersoni is a stout, flat salamander. Head is broad and triangular in shape. There are 12–15 conspicuous knob-like lateral glands. Colouration is uniformly dark brown or black, only the underside of the tail, cloacal region, and the soles of the feet are yellow-orange. The maximum size is at least 80 mm (3.1 in) in snout–vent length and 169 mm (6.7 in) in total length.

== Habitat and distribution ==
Its natural habitats are broad-leaved evergreen forests, secondary forests, grasslands and swamps. It has also been found in and near sugar cane fields. It breeds in standing water such as ponds and temporary pools; outside breeding season it is difficult to observe as adult salamanders live in leaf litter, in rocky crevices, and under rocks and logs.

Anderson’s crocodile newt is distributed across five of the central Ryukyu Islands: Okinawajima, Sesokojima, and Tokashikijima of the Okinawa group, and Amami-o-shima and Tokunoshima of the Amami group (although sightings on the latter group appear to be rare or nonexistent).

== Behaviour ==
This species breeds from February to July, with activity peaking from March to May. The female lays her small clutch of eggs in leaf litter, humus soil, or beneath small objects like leaves or rocks; usually not further than a metre or two away from a body of still water. The later age hatch after 22–27 days, and after another 2–3 months they metamorphose into their terrestrial adult forms.

== Conservation ==
Echinotriton andersoni is uncommon, and it is threatened by habitat loss and by collection for illegal pet trade. Paved roads with roadside gutters are reportedly leading to large numbers of these newts ending up as roadkill.

== Venomous ==
Echinotriton andersoni protects itself from predators through the uncommon ability to use their ribs to envenomate the threat. This is done by the ribs puncturing through their epidermis and lateral granular glands, which produce tetrodotoxin and piercing the threat. The mechanisms that are used for this method of protection are unusual due to their lack of muscular attachment at the ends of their ribs and the concentration of the granular glands. Occasionally their glands can appear as a lighter color than the surrounding area, hypothesized to be due to higher concentration of the tetrodotoxin in the area around their glands.

== See also ==
- Anderson's salamander (Ambystoma andersoni)
