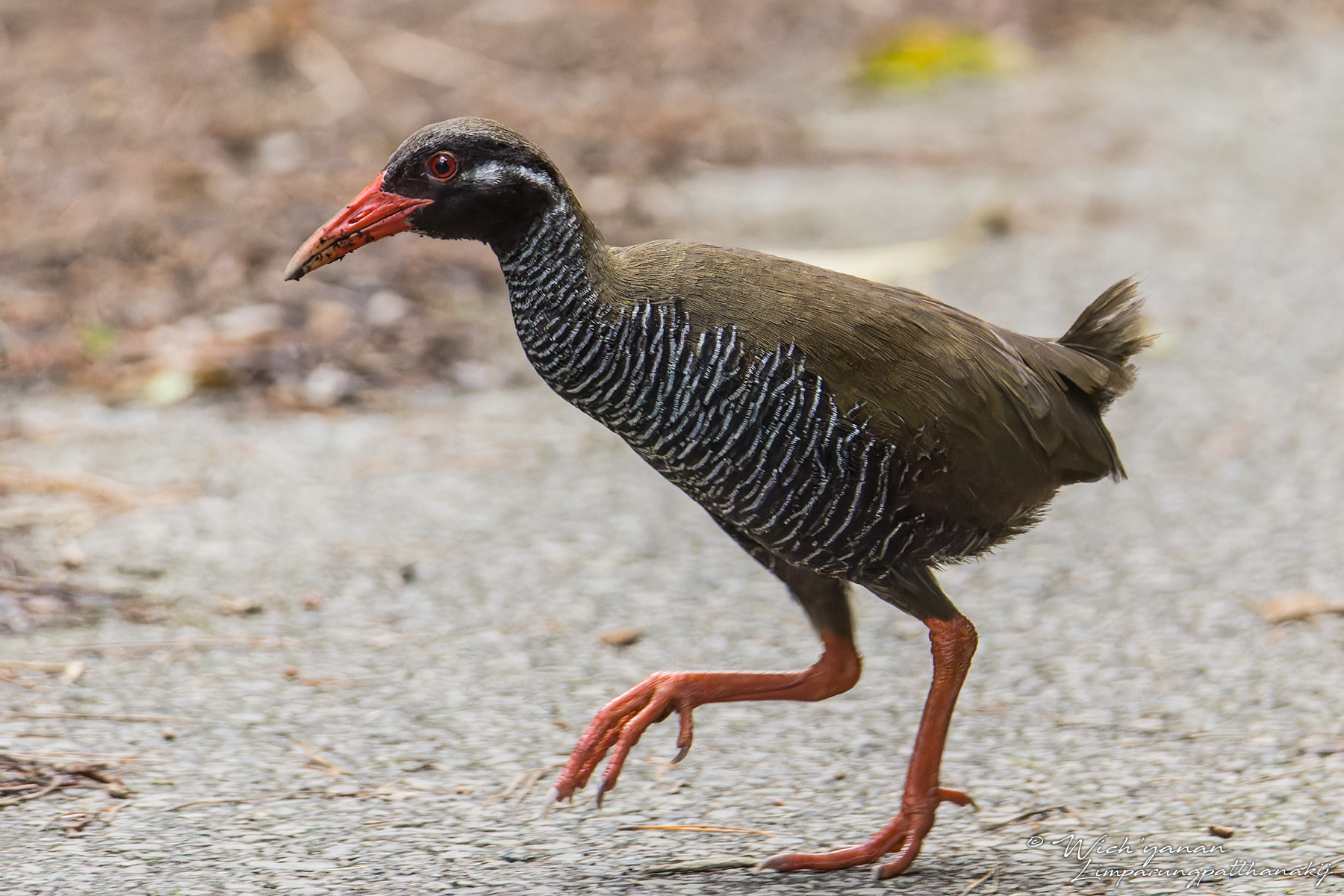

Conservation status
- Endangered (IUCN 3.1)

Scientific classification
- Kingdom: Animalia
- Phylum: Chordata
- Class: Aves
- Order: Gruiformes
- Family: Rallidae
- Genus: Gallirallus
- Species: G. okinawae

Binomial name
- Gallirallus okinawae (Yamashina & Mano, 1981)
- Approximate distribution Range Depicted: Okinawa Island, Japan

Synonyms
- Gallirallus okinawae Yamashina & Mano, 1981; Rallus okinawae (Yamashina & Mano, 1981)

= Okinawa rail =

Species of bird

The Okinawa rail (Gallirallus okinawae) is a species of bird in the rail family, Rallidae. It is endemic to Okinawa Island in Japan where it is known as the Yanbaru kuina (ヤンバルクイナ（山原水鶏）, "Yanbaru rail"). Its existence was only confirmed in 1978 and it was formally described in 1981 although unidentified rails had been recorded on the island since at least 1973 and local stories of a bird known as the agachi kumira may refer to this species. The species was formerly placed in the genus Hypotaenidia.

It is a medium-sized and almost flightless rail with short wings and tail, olive-brown upperparts, black underparts with white bars and a red bill and legs.

It occurs in subtropical moist forests and in neighboring habitats. It nests and feeds on the ground but usually roosts in trees. It is classified as an endangered species and is threatened by habitat loss and introduced predators.

== Taxonomy ==
The species was first described in 1981 by Yoshimaro Yamashina and T. Mano in the Journal of the Yamashina Institute of Ornithology. This was based on a specimen found dead on June 2 at Mt. Fuenchiji in Kunigami District, Okinawa. It was initially placed in the genus Rallus but then moved to Gallirallus, a genus of medium-sized, often flightless, rails found in Australasia and Asia. It is closely related to the barred rail (G. torquatus) and New Britain rail (G. insignis) as well as to the Calayan rail (G. calayanensis), another recently discovered species.

== Description ==
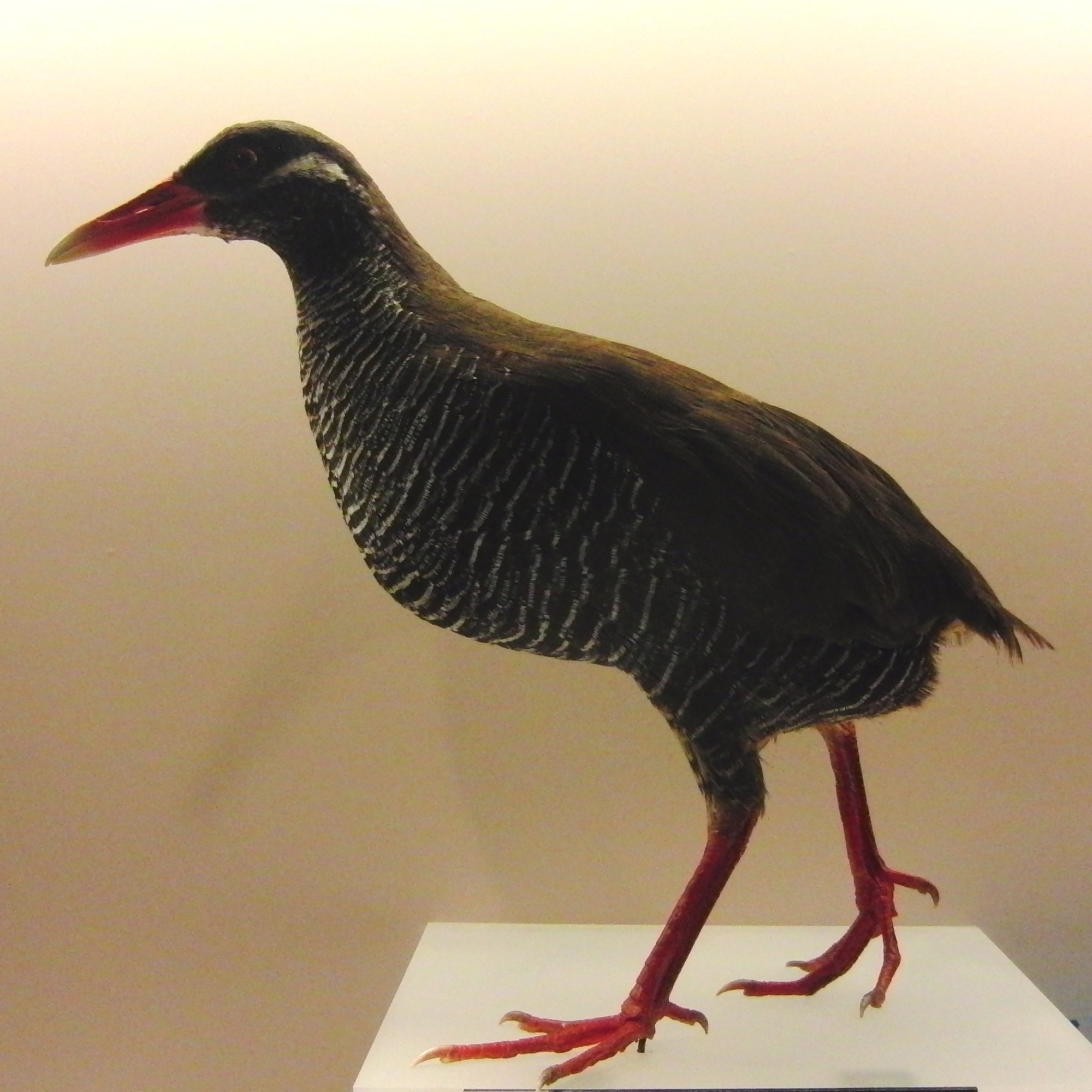
Stuffed specimen of Hypotaenidia okinawae at the National Museum of Nature and Science, Tokyo, Japan.

It is about 30 cm long with a wingspan of 50 cm and a weight of around 435 g. It is almost flightless and has very short wings and tail. The bill is large and bright red with a whitish tip. The long, strong legs are red as are the iris and eye-ring. Its wingspan measures 48–50 cm (19–20 in).

The upperparts are olive-brown while the underparts are black with narrow white bars. The face is black with a white spot between the bill and eye and a white line behind the eye, extending back to the side of the neck. The undertail-coverts are dark brown with pale bars.

Juvenile birds are paler than the adults and are mottled white below rather than barred. The spot in front of the eye is tinged with brown while the stripe behind is shorter than in the adult. The bill and iris are brownish and the legs and feet are yellow-ochre.

It is a noisy bird with a variety of loud calls. It calls most often early and late in the day, usually from the ground but sometimes from trees. Pairs often call together and up to 12 birds have been heard in one area.

== Distribution and habitat ==
It is found only in Yanbaru, the northern part of Okinawa Island in the Ryukyu Islands of southern Japan, from where it gets its Japanese name. It has a total range of just 260 km^{2}. It occurs from sea-level to the highest mountains at 498 m above sea-level. In winter, some birds move lower down or move a little further south of the breeding range.

It mainly occurs in evergreen broad-leaved forest but also occurs in marshes, grassland and cultivated land close to forested areas and water. Itaji (Castanopsis sieboldii) is the dominant tree in the rail's habitat but it also occurs among other trees such as Ryukyu Pine (Pinus luchuensis). It requires dense ground vegetation as well as standing water for bathing.

== Behavior ==
It is a poor flyer but it can run rapidly. It spends most of its time on the ground but usually roosts in trees, climbing up to sleep on a branch or sloping trunk. In the morning, it preens and stretches before dropping straight to the ground. It is usually found in dense cover but comes into the open to bathe. It bathes for short bouts of 2–4 minutes before preening for 4–20 minutes.

It feeds on lizards, amphibians, snails and large insects such as locusts. Food is mainly taken from the forest floor but may also be taken from shallow water.

Pairs are monogamous and appear to mate for life. The nest is built on the ground and made of leaves, grass and fern fronds. The eggs are laid between May and July and there are 2–4 in a clutch. The eggs are oval in shape and white with reddish, pinkish or brownish markings concentrated at the larger end. The downy young are black with yellowish legs and feet and a white bill with a blackish base and tip. The eggs and young are often predated by the habu (Trimeresurus flavoviridis), a venomous snake.

== Status and conservation ==
The species is classified as endangered by BirdLife International because of its small, declining population and restricted range. The total population was estimated at 1,800 birds in 1986. Surveys between 1996 and 2004 suggested a significant decline to about 720 birds and a northward contraction of the range of about 40%. However, a survey in 2006 found no further range contraction.

It is threatened by the loss and fragmentation of its forest habitat due to logging, agriculture and the building of roads, dams and golf courses. Introduced predators such as cats, dogs and the small Asian mongoose probably have an impact while some birds are killed by vehicles on roads.

The species is legally protected in Japan and has been declared a "Natural Monument" and a "Special Bird for Protection". Yanbaru became a national park in 2016 and several forest sites have been bought by conservation organizations as nature reserves. Trapping is taking place to reduce predator numbers and traffic calming has been introduced to some areas to reduce the number of birds killed on roads. A captive breeding program is planned for the future. The Japanese Ministry of the Environment has laid out a 10-year action plan with steps it plans to take to stabilize the species numbers.
