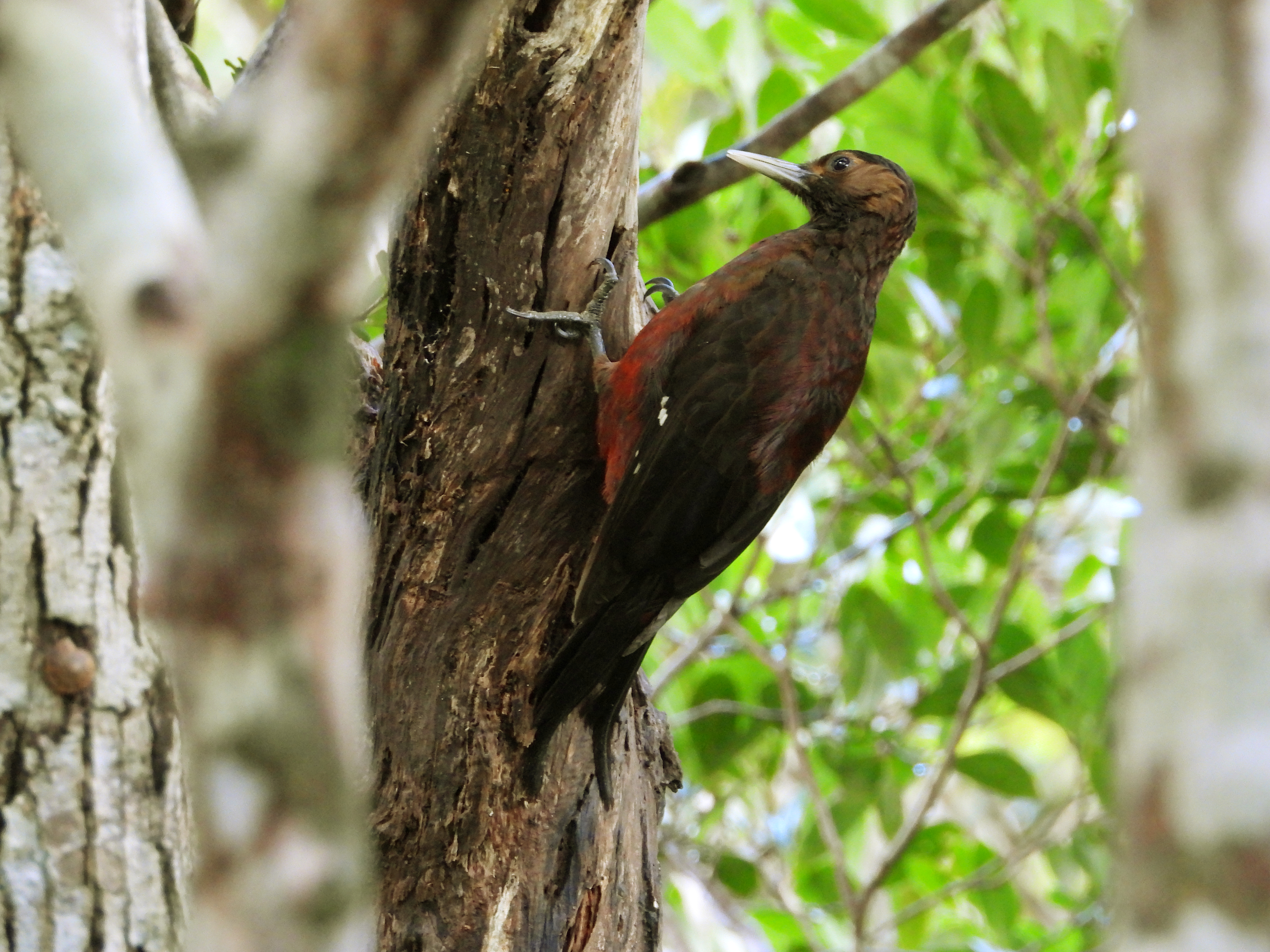

Conservation status
- Endangered (IUCN 3.1)

Scientific classification
- Kingdom: Animalia
- Phylum: Chordata
- Class: Aves
- Order: Piciformes
- Family: Picidae
- Genus: Dendrocopos
- Species: D. noguchii

Binomial name
- Dendrocopos noguchii (Seebohm, 1887)
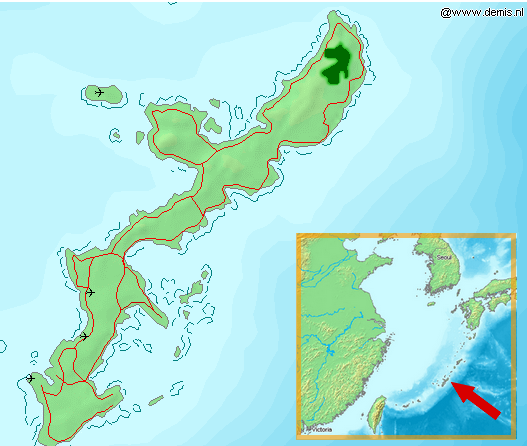
- Resident

Synonyms
- Sapheopipo noguchii

= Okinawa woodpecker =

Species of bird

The Okinawa woodpecker (Dendrocopos noguchii) (ノグチゲラ, Noguchigera) is a woodpecker endemic to the Okinawa Prefecture of Japan.

== Taxonomy ==
Other common names for this species are Noguchi's woodpecker, Okinawan woodpecker, Pryer's woodpecker and Ryukyu woodpecker. It was previously placed in the monotypic genus Sapheopipo, but mtDNA analysis has shown that this species is actually embedded within the Dendrocopos genus, closely related to the great spotted woodpecker (Dendrocopos major) and white-backed woodpecker (D. leucotos).

== Description ==
This is a medium-sized (31 cm), dark woodpecker. It is dark brown in color with red-tipped feathers. It has white spots on the primaries. The head is a paler brown, with a dark red crown on the male and a blackish-brown one on the female. The call is a sharp whit call and a variable kyu-kyu kup kup kup or kyu kyu kup.

== Diet and foraging ==
The Okinawa woodpecker prefers to forage nearer to the ground, mostly below 5 metres (16 ft). It clings firmly to bark with its zygodactyl feet (two toes forward, two toes back) and uses its stiff tail feathers to brace itself against the tree as it strikes with its beak, repeatedly hammering at trunks, stumps, and bamboo stalks — leaving them pitted with holes 3 to 4 centimetres (~1.5 in) deep — as it excavates boring insects and their larvae. Male woodpecker will often search for spiders and cicada nymphs on the ground while females will excavate boring beetles from tree trunks.

Its diet consists of large arthropods, moths, centipedes, beetle larvae, spiders, and even gecko nestlings. It will occasionally forage for fruits, berries, acorns, other nuts, and seeds.

== Habitat ==
This woodpecker primarily lives in undisturbed mature primary forests; mostly in the subtropical evergreen forests of Yambaru's central mountains. It can occasionally be seen in secondary forests as well. It prefers areas with soft, decaying wood and seems to avoid those with many conifer trees.

== Reproduction ==
Their breeding habitat is subtropical, evergreen broad-leaved forest that is at least 30 years old on Okinawa Island, with tall trees of more than 20 cm in diameter.

Nesting occurs between late February and May. Laying occurs from late Feb to May, typically during March and April, and chicks are present in the nest until June. The clutch size isn't known but 1 to 3 chicks are raised per brood.

== Conservation ==
This woodpecker has a single tiny population which is threatened by habitat loss of mature forest due to logging, dam construction, agriculture, military and golf course developments. A major problem now is that one of their main habitats is being destroyed. The current population is estimated at less than 600. This species is suspected to be declining at a rate of 10-19% over ten years, as a result of ongoing clearance of old-growth forests.

This woodpecker is legally protected in Japan. It occurs in Yonaha-dake Prefecture Protection Area and small protected areas on Mount Ibu and Mount Nishime and conservation organisations have purchased sites where it occurs, but it is mainly found in the Okinawa Prefecture. In 1996, Yambaru was designated as a national park.

While listed as critically endangered since 1994, in 2024 the Okinawa woodpecker was downlisted to endangered because the previously declining population trend has stabilized. This is the result of forest protection in its endemic range and some success in controlling the invasive small Indian mongoose.

=== Threats to the species ===
The habitat of the Okinawa woodpecker is threatened by the construction of six new American helipads located about 9.5 km Southwest of the Yanbaru forest of Takae. The lives of the birds themselves are also put at risk by the flights of V-22 Ospreys over the island.
