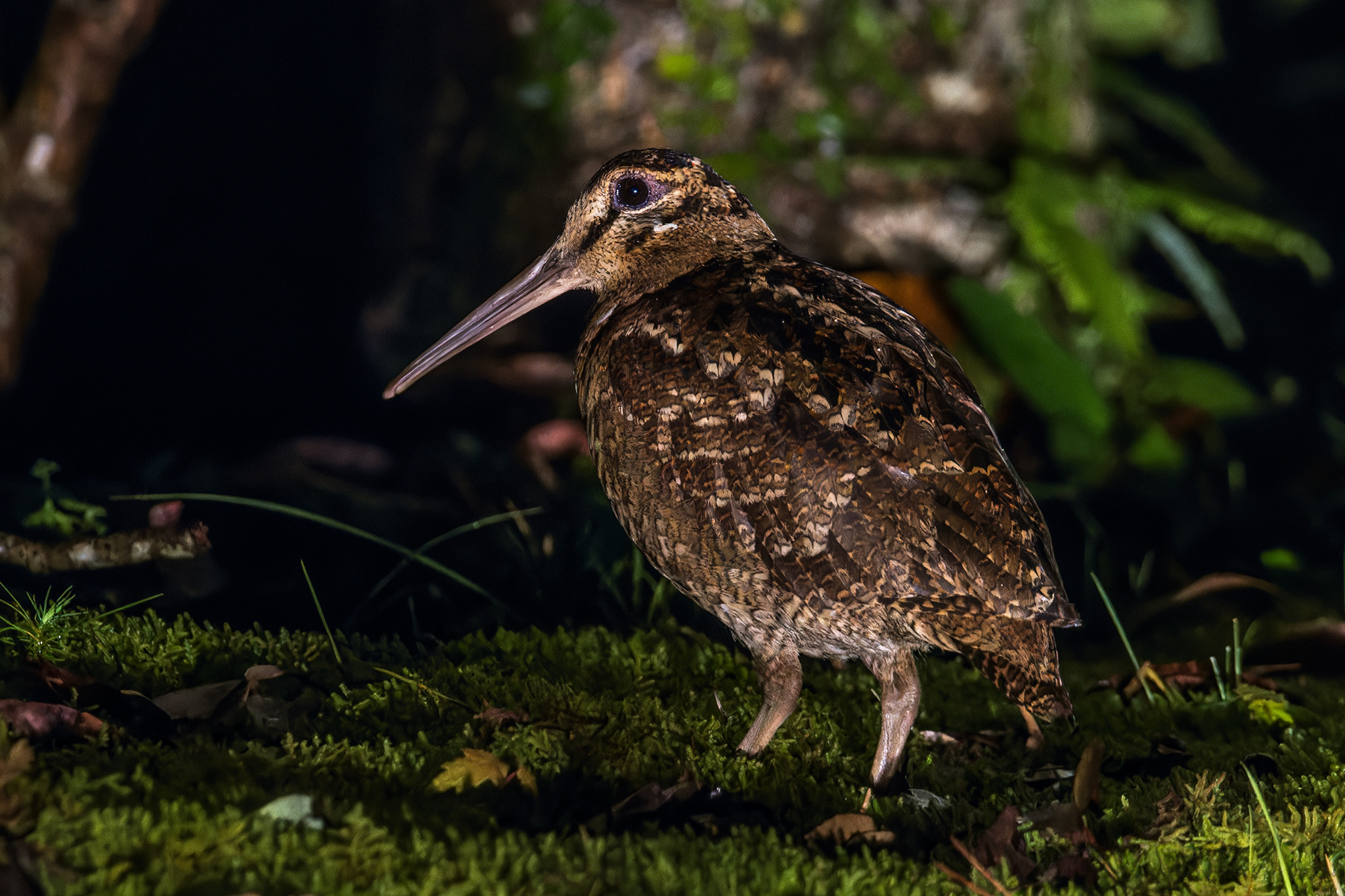

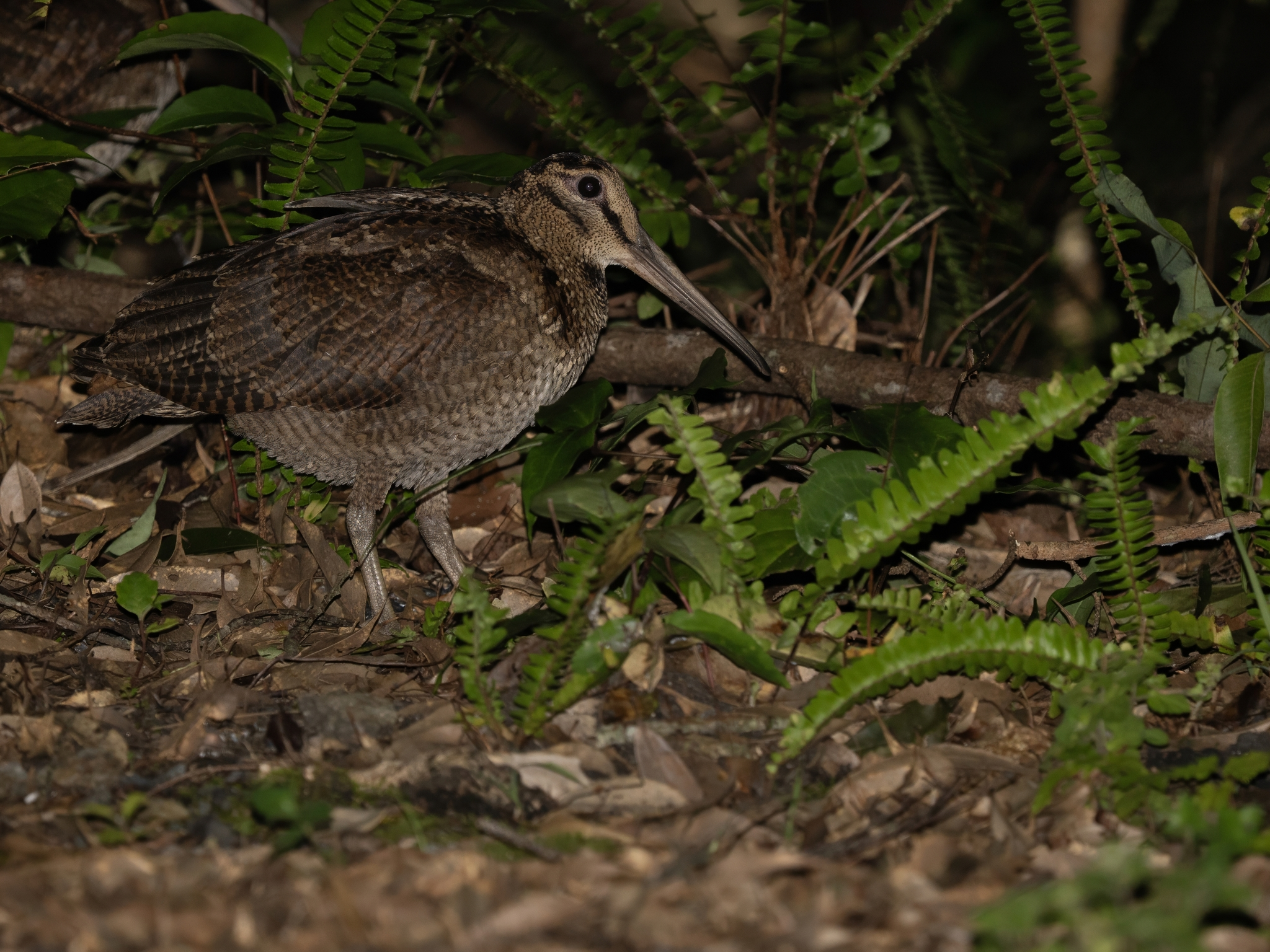

Conservation status
- Near Threatened (IUCN 3.1)

Scientific classification
- Kingdom: Animalia
- Phylum: Chordata
- Class: Aves
- Order: Charadriiformes
- Family: Scolopacidae
- Genus: Scolopax
- Species: S. mira

Binomial name
- Scolopax mira Hartert, 1916

= Amami woodcock =

Species of bird

The Amami woodcock (Scolopax mira) is a medium-sized wader. It is slightly larger and longer-legged than the Eurasian woodcock.

This species is a restricted-range endemic found only in forests on Amami Ōshima, Okinawa and Tokunoshima, including some smaller, nearby islands (Kakeromajima and Tokashiki). Due to the introduction of the invasive small Indian mongoose, their population has been declining. Efforts to control the mongoose population have led to recovery of Amami woodcock, as documented on Amami where the mongoose has been successfully eradicated. Insofar as its habits are known, they are similar to the Eurasian woodcock.

== Taxonomy and systematics ==
The Amami woodcock was originally described as a subspecies of the Eurasian woodcock, due to a juvenile that resembled the Eurasian woodcock in coloration. Later, some argued that the Amami woodcock was a distinct species—Kobayashi in 1979 and Cramp & Simmons in 1983. Comparison between the two species revealed their distinct physical features, and led to the emergence of the Amami woodcock as a distinct species.
