= List of cities and districts of Okinawa Prefecture =

This is a list of cities and districts of Okinawa Prefecture, Japan:

== Cities ==
- Ginowan
- Ishigaki
- Itoman
- Miyakojima (Formerly Hirara, Gusukube, Irabu, Shimoji, Ueno)
- Nago
- Naha (capital)
- Nanjō (Formerly Sashiki, Chinen, Ōzato, and Tamagusuku)
- Okinawa
- Tomigusuku
- Urasoe
- Uruma (Formerly Gushikawa, Ishikawa, Katsuren, and Yonashiro)

== Districts ==
- Kunigami
  - Ginoza
  - Higashi
  - Ie
  - Kin
  - Kunigami
  - Motobu
  - Nakijin
  - On'na
  - Oogimi
- Miyako
  - Tarama
- Nakagami
  - Chatan
  - Kadena
  - Kitanakagusuku
  - Nakagusuku
  - Nishihara
  - Yomitan
- Shimajiri
  - Aguni
  - Haebaru
  - Iheya
  - Izena
  - Kitadaitou
  - Kumejima
  - Minamidaitō
  - Tokashiki
  - Tonaki
  - Yaese (Formerly Gushikami and Kochinda)
  - Yonabaru
  - Zamami
- Yaeyama
  - Taketomi
  - Yonaguni
