= Genji Kuniyoshi =

Japanese singer (1930–2021)

Genji Kuniyoshi 国吉 源次
- Born: June 10, 1930; Gusukube, Okinawa, Japan
- Died: May 4, 2021 (aged 90)
- Genres: Folk
- Occupation: Singer
- Years active: 1967–2021

Genji Kuniyoshi (国吉 源次, Kuniyoshi Genji, June 30, 1930 – May 4, 2021) was a Japanese singer of Okinawan folk songs (mainly Miyako folk songs). He is known as a leading figure in Miyakojima Kayo.

== Biography ==
Kuniyoshi was born in 1930 in Aragusuku, Gusukube, Miyako District, Okinawa (present-day Miyakojima). He had been fond of singing since he was a child, and he is said to have been a "singing" boy all the time. He joined the Shinshiro Youth Association at the age of 15 in 1945. At the age of 20, he began to perform songs and sanshin at local performances. After that, he became president of the Shinshiro Youth Association at the age of 24 and played an active part in the competition in Miyakojima.

In 1965, Kuniyoshi decided to live on the path of Miyako folk songs and went to Naha on the Miyako Maru. The following year, he appeared on the Ryukyu Broadcasting program "Kin no Uta Gin no Uta". He sang the representative love song "Irabu Togany" that is handed down on Irabu Island in the Miyako Islands. At the 20th NHK Nodo Jiman Okinawa District Tournament held on February 13, 1967, he won the folk song division and demonstrated his exceptional talent on the main island of Okinawa. The following month he also participated in national competitions. He made his full-scale debut as a folk singer. He had appeared in the Ryukyu Broadcasting program "New Year Folk Song Kouhaku Uta Gassen" for 25 consecutive years since 1968. This year, he released the first record of Miyako folk songs after the war, following the prewar Tomori Akira decree.

Although Kuniyoshi's first recital was held in his hometown of Miyakojima in 1969, the two-day performance schedule was extended to three days because it was too crowded to accommodate. Since then, he had held recitals five times in Miyako. In 1971, he opened a folk song research institute in Naha and appeared on Okinawa TV's "East and West Folk Song Battle". Since then, he has appeared on the show for 20 consecutive years. In 1990, he held a recital "The World of Genji Kuniyoshi, Forty Years of Performing Arts" to commemorate the 40th anniversary of performing arts, but underwent surgery for brain tumor twice in 1991 and 1993. Six months after his second surgery, he resumed playing in earnest. In 1995, he released his first CD album "Hatsukoi". In 1999, he held a recital to commemorate the 50th anniversary of performing arts, "The World of Genji Kuniyoshi, 50 Years of Performing Arts-The Essence of Miyako Folk Songs in the 20th Century".

In 2003, Kuniyoshi was certified as a Person of Cultural Merit in Okinawa Prefecture. In the past, he had held executive positions such as the chairman of the Ryukyu Folk Song Association (2nd term), the chairman of the Miyako Comprehensive Performing Arts Association, and the chairman of the Ryukyu Folk Song Preservation Society (2nd term). He served as chairman of the Miyako Folk Song Preservation Society until his death.

Kuniyoshi's wife is also Miyako folk singer Yoshiko Kuniyoshi. He died of prostate cancer at 3:23 pm on May 4, 2021. He was 90 years old.
