= German Emperor's Tributary Monument =

Coordinates: 24.8063°N 125.2797°E

The German Emperor's Tributary Monument (ドイツ皇帝博愛記念碑, Doitsu kōtei hakuai kinenhi), also known as the Friendship, Philanthropy, Humanity, or Hakuai Monument, is a stele in the Harimizu area of Miyakojima, Okinawa.

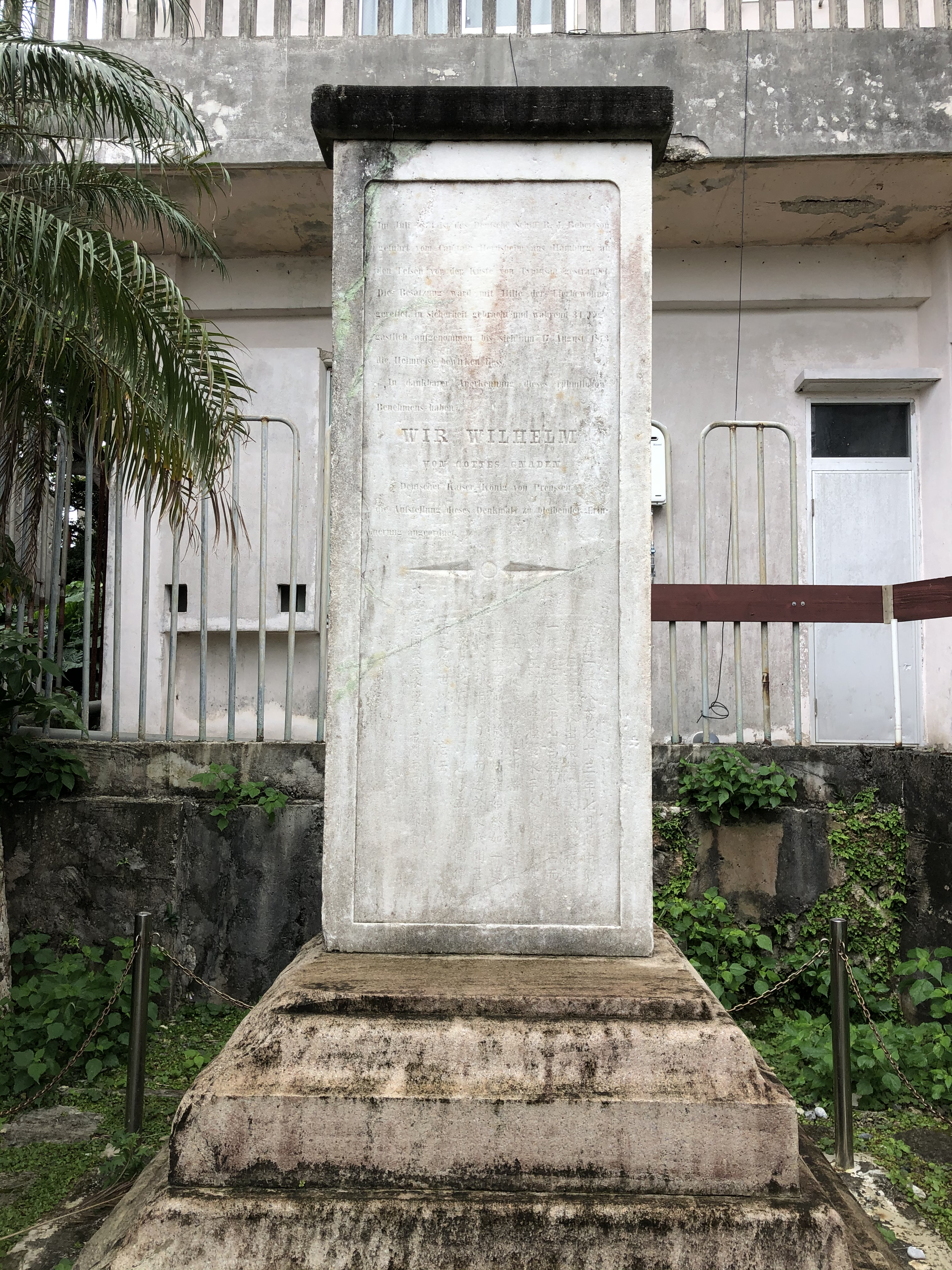
The German Emperor's Tributary Monument

== History ==
In 1873, the German schooner R. J. Robertson was wrecked off the coast of Ueno Village of Miyako Island in the Ryukyu Kingdom. The crew was saved by the local islanders, who took care of them. As a gift for the islanders' kindness, and as an excuse for German warships to enter Ryukyuan waters, Kaiser Wilhelm I erected the monument in Hirara City in 1876.

The inscription on the monument reads:

Im Juli 1873 ist das Deutsche Schiff R. J. Robertson geführt vom Capitän Hernsheim aus Hamburg an den Felsen vor der Küste von Typinsan gestrandet. Die Besatzung ward mit Hilfe der Uferbewohner gerettet, in Sicherheit gebracht und während 31 Tage gastlich aufgenommen, bis sich am 17. August 1873 die Heimreise bewirken liess. In dankbarer Anerkennung dieses rühmlichen Benehmens haben WIR WILHELM VON GOTTES GNADEN Deutscher Kaiser, König von Preussen die Aufstellung dieses Denkmals in bleibender Erinnerung angeordnet.

After Japan annexed the Ryukyu Kingdom, Japan used the monument as evidence of a history of friendship between Japan and Germany, and erected a second monument near the site of the wreck in 1936 that read "The land of German merchant marine distress" (獨逸商船遭難の地, Doitsu shōsen sōnan no ji). In 1987, Ueno German Culture Village was built around the Japanese monument.
