= Ueno German Culture Village =

Theme park in Okinawa, Japan

Coordinates: 24.7193°N 125.3226°E

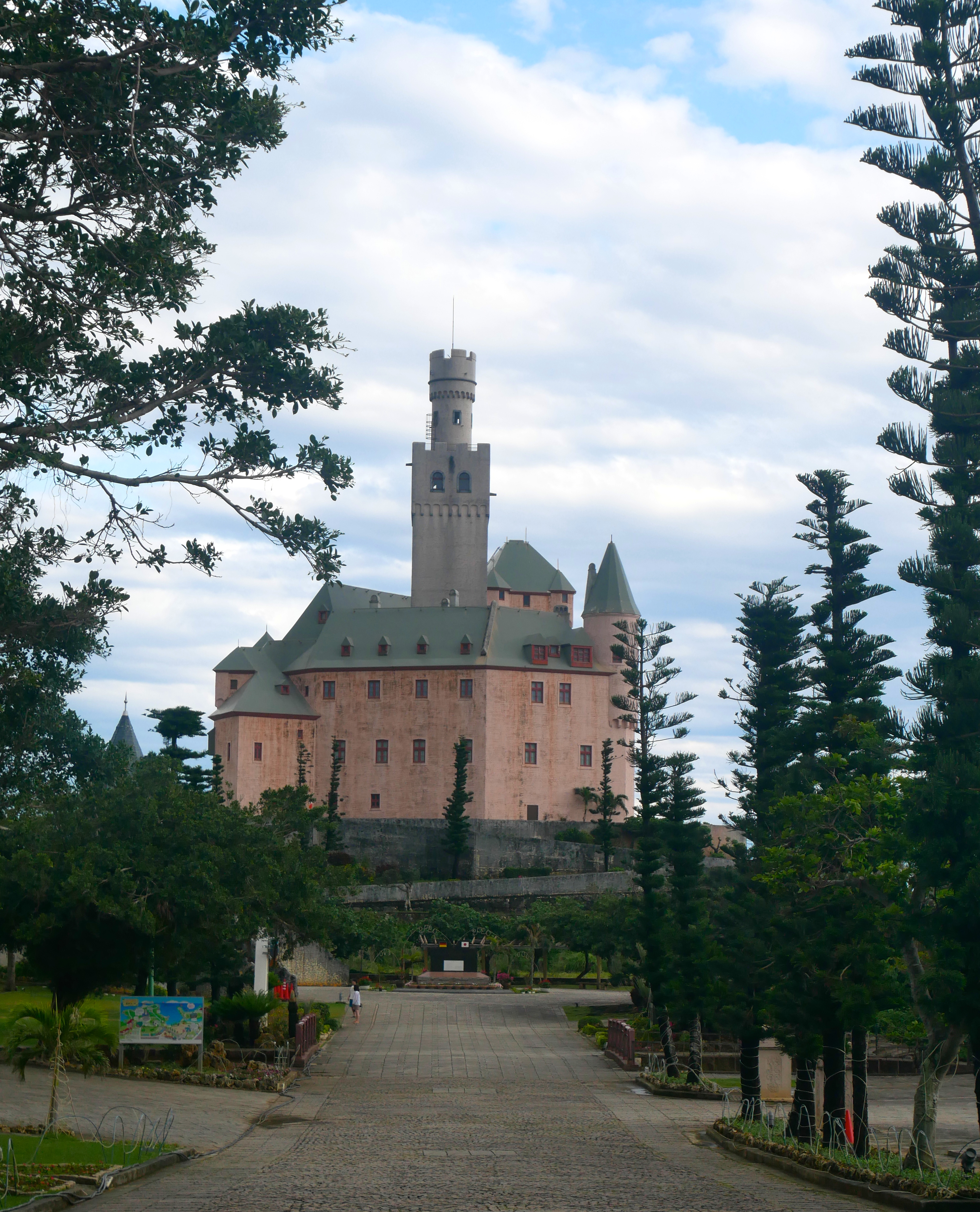
Ueno German Culture Village: Marksburg replica, a copy of a German medieval castle.

Ueno German Culture Village (うえのドイツ文化村, Ueno Doitsu Bunka Mura; German: Deutsches Kulturdorf Ueno) is a theme park in Miyakojima, Okinawa. It is located in Ueno district.

== History ==
In 1873, the German schooner R. J. Robertson was shipwrecked off the coast of Miyako Island near what is now the German Culture Village in Ueno. The crew were saved and cared for by the local islanders. As a gift for the islanders' kindness, and as an excuse for German warships to enter Ryukyuan waters, Kaiser Wilhelm I erected a monument in Hirara City in 1876, known locally as the German Emperor's Tributary Monument or the Friendship Monument. After Japan annexed the Ryukyu Kingdom, Japan used this event as evidence of a history of friendship between Japan and Germany, and erected a second monument near the site of the wreck in 1936 that read "Site where German merchant marine ship ran into distress" (獨逸商船遭難之地, Doitsu shōsen sōnan no ji).

Construction of Ueno German Culture Village commenced in 1987 at the site of the Japanese monument. The park partially opened in 1993 and a grand opening ceremony was held in 1996. On 21 July 2000 Chancellor of Germany Gerhard Schröder visited the park prior to attending the 26th G8 Summit in Okinawa.

== Attractions ==
The park is centered on a replica of Marksburg Castle, which contains a museum. A notable exhibit at the museum is a section of the Berlin Wall. There is also a restaurant, a hotel, and a glass-bottom boat ride.

== Gallery ==
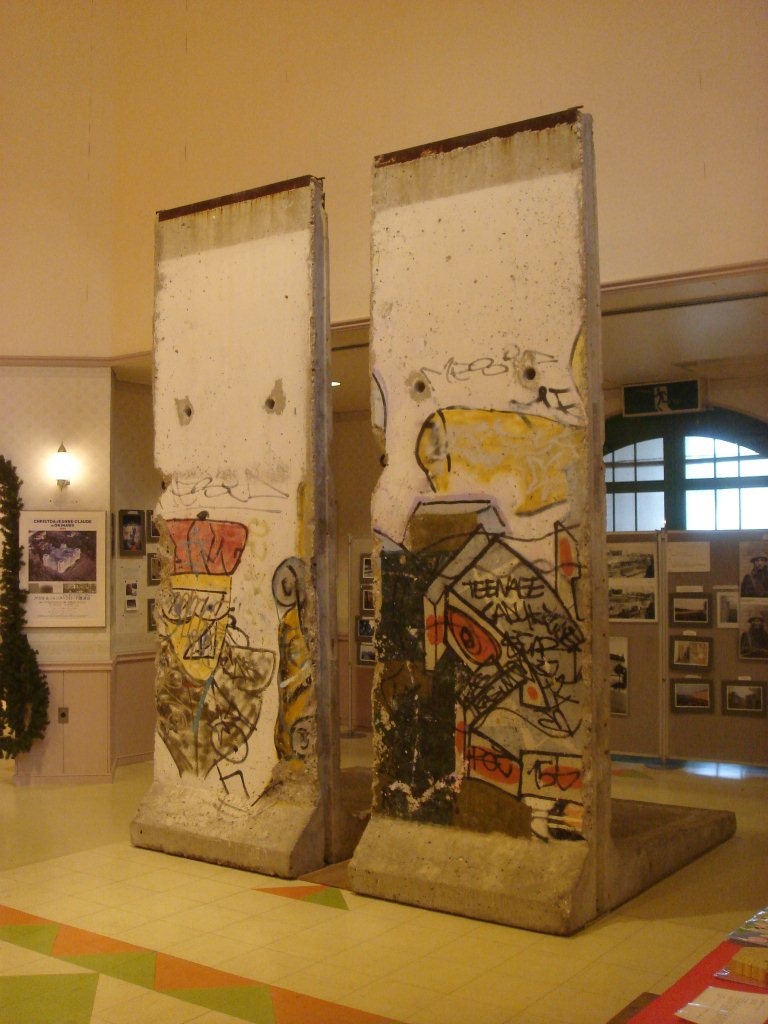
Section of the Berlin Wall in the "Museum of Philanthropy"

Views in the park, 2020

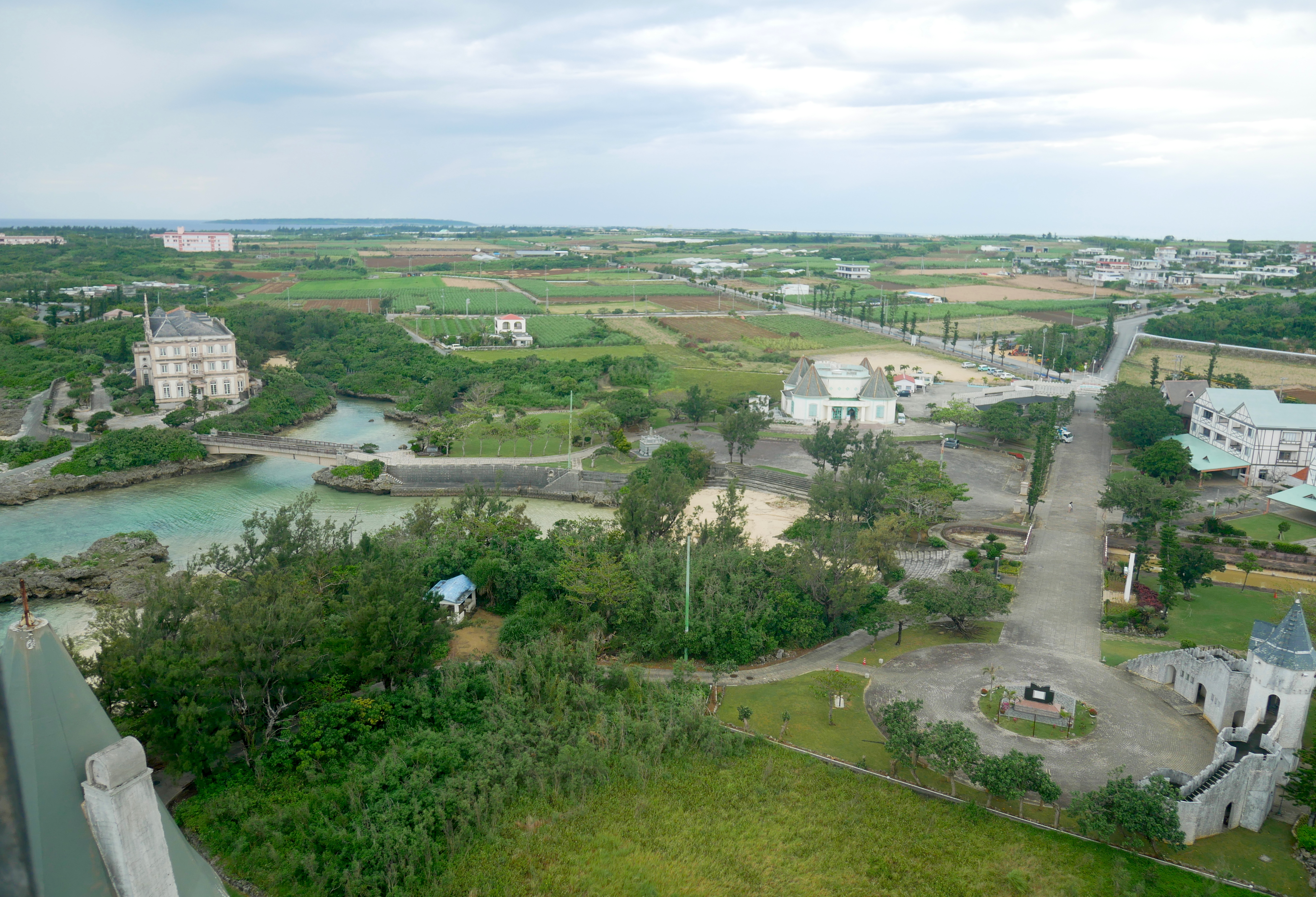
View from the castle
