= Detmar Westhoff =

Detmar Jobst Wilhelm Westhoff (born 28 February 1966) is a German art historian and curator.

== Education & early career ==
Detmar Westhoff was born in Bonn as the son of the art historian Dr. Hildegard Westhoff-Krummacher, who worked at the Westphalian State Museum of Art and Cultural History in Münster (LWL-Museum für Kunst und Kultur). While studying art history at the Johann Wolfgang Goethe University in Frankfurt am Main, he met the former director of the Guggenheim Foundation Thomas M. Messer, who was visiting lecturer and at the same time visiting curator at the Schirn Kunsthalle, where Westhoff started to work after graduation. From 2001 to 2006 he set up the fundraising department in the Kunstsammlung NRW (K20 / K21) and developed for example the KPMG art evening and the cooperation of Georg Baselitz with the publishing group Handelsblatt.

== Curating activity ==
In 2006 Westhoff started working as independent curator and exhibition coordinator. Soon his focus was to bring European art to Asia and vice versa, encouraging cultural exchange and mutual artistic understanding. The success of his initiative and increasing demand led him to founding Westhoff Fine Arts - Exhibition Services. Since then, Westhoff has initiated, co-curated and coordinated numerous exhibitions focusing on modern art and exhibitions in the fields of photography, fashion, fashion photography and old masters. Due to his contacts to leading art institutions in Asia and Europe, Westhoff's curates art exhibitions and art collections across the continents. Westhoff's co-curated exhibitions include The Savages of Germany, Die Brücke and Der Blaue Reiter Expressionists at the Kumu Art Museum Tallinn (2017/2018) and the Museum de Fundatie in Zwolle (2016), as well as Japan’s love for Impressionism - from Monet to Renoir at the Federal exhibition hall of Germany in Bonn (2015/2016).

== Voluntary activities, memberships and initiatives in art and culture ==
Member of ICOM and Deutscher Museumsbund, Westhoff is also honorary member in several cultural and artistic associations, for example as former chairman of the Rhineland group of the German castle association (2006-2019), now its vice chairman, and vice-president of 701 e.V., which is dedicated to the promotion of young experimental artists. He is particularly involved in 701's “Düsseldorf art talks”. Together with the Marketing Club Düsseldorf, he founded the association Anna Maria Luisa de’ Medici in 2009, which awards companies and institutions who are particularly committed to promoting the arts and culture, and of which he was chairman from 2009 to 2012. As consultant to the management, he accompanied the Rudolf-Oetker-Foundation during the first years in the areas of preservation of monuments and museum art acquisitions from 2000 to 2002. In addition Westhoff regularly takes on teaching assignments on cultural funding at the Heinrich Heine University in Düsseldorf and the Ruhr University Bochum, holds lectures and initiates cooperation between students of art history and the professional world.

== Art historical writings ==
- Die Italienreise von Theobald Rheinhold von Oer. 1837–1839, 2 Bde., Univ., Mag.Arb., Frankfurt am Main 1995.
- Das in der Natur innewohnende Göttliche, in: „DU – Das Kunstmagazin" (2012)
- DBV-Landesgruppen-Vorsitzender Detmar Westhoff blickt ins Jahr 2053, 2013.
- Why the Japanese love Impressionism, in: Exhibition Catalogue Japan's Love for Impressionism. From Monet to Renoir, Bundeskunsthalle, Bonn 2015, S. 234-241.
- Waarom duitsers van expressionisme houden en waarom nederlanders dat ook zouden moeten doen, in: Ausst.-Kat. Wilden - Expressionisme van ‚Brücke‘ en ‚Der Blaue Reiter‘, Museum de Fundatie, Zwolle 2016, p. 148–152.
- Kojiro Matsukata – Cosmopolite and Philanthropist, in: Exhibition Catalogue Renoir, Monet, Gauguin. Images of a floating world. The collections of Kōjirō Matsukata and Karl Ernst Osthaus, Museum Folkwang, Essen 2022, p. 350-360.
