= Miyako district =

Miyako district may refer to:

- Miyako District, Fukuoka, Japan
- Miyako District, Okinawa, Japan
