= Masanobu =

- Gender: Male

Origin
- Origin: Japanese
- Meaning: Different meanings depending on the kanji used

Masanobu (written: 雅信, 雅伸, 政信, 政伸, 政修, 正信, 正謖, 昌信 or 昌伸) is a masculine Japanese given name. Notable people with the name include:

- Minamoto no Masanobu (源 雅信; 920–993), Japanese kugyō
- Kanō Masanobu (狩野 正信; 1434?–1530?), Japanese painter
- Kōsaka Masanobu (高坂 昌信; 1527–1578), Japanese samurai
- Honda Masanobu (本多 正信; 1538–1616), Japanese daimyō
- Okumura Masanobu (奥村 政信; 1686–1764), Japanese print designer, book publisher and painter
- Inaba Masanobu (稲葉 正謖; 1749–1806), Japanese daimyō
- Masanobu Tsuji (辻 政信; 1901–ca.1961), Japanese military leader
- Masanobu Fukuoka (福岡 正信; 1913–2008), Japanese farmer and philosopher
- Chiyonoyama Masanobu (千代の山 雅信; 1926–1977), Japanese sumo wrestler
- Masanobu Shinozuka (1930-2018), Japanese engineer
- Masanobu Deme (出目昌伸; born 1932), Japanese film director
- Masanobu Izumi (泉 政伸; born 1944), Japanese footballer
- Masanobu Ohata (大畑 政修; born 1947), Japanese sport shooter
- Masanobu Yamamoto (山本 真伸; born 1949), Japanese rower
- Masanobu Endō (遠藤 雅伸; born 1953), Japanese video game designer
- Masanobu Fuchi (渕 正信; born 1954), Japanese professional wrestler
- Masanobu Kikukawa (喜久川 政信; born 1954), Japanese karateka
- Masanobu Kimura (木村 政信; born 1960), Japanese golfer
- Masanobu Takashima (高嶋 政伸) (born 1966) Japanese actor
- Masanobu Matsunami (松波 正信; born 1974), Japanese footballer
- Masanobu Andō (安藤 政信; born 1975), Japanese actor
