= Miyakojima City Tropical Plant Garden =

Botanical garden in Japan

Coordinates: 24°48′5″N 125°18′55″E

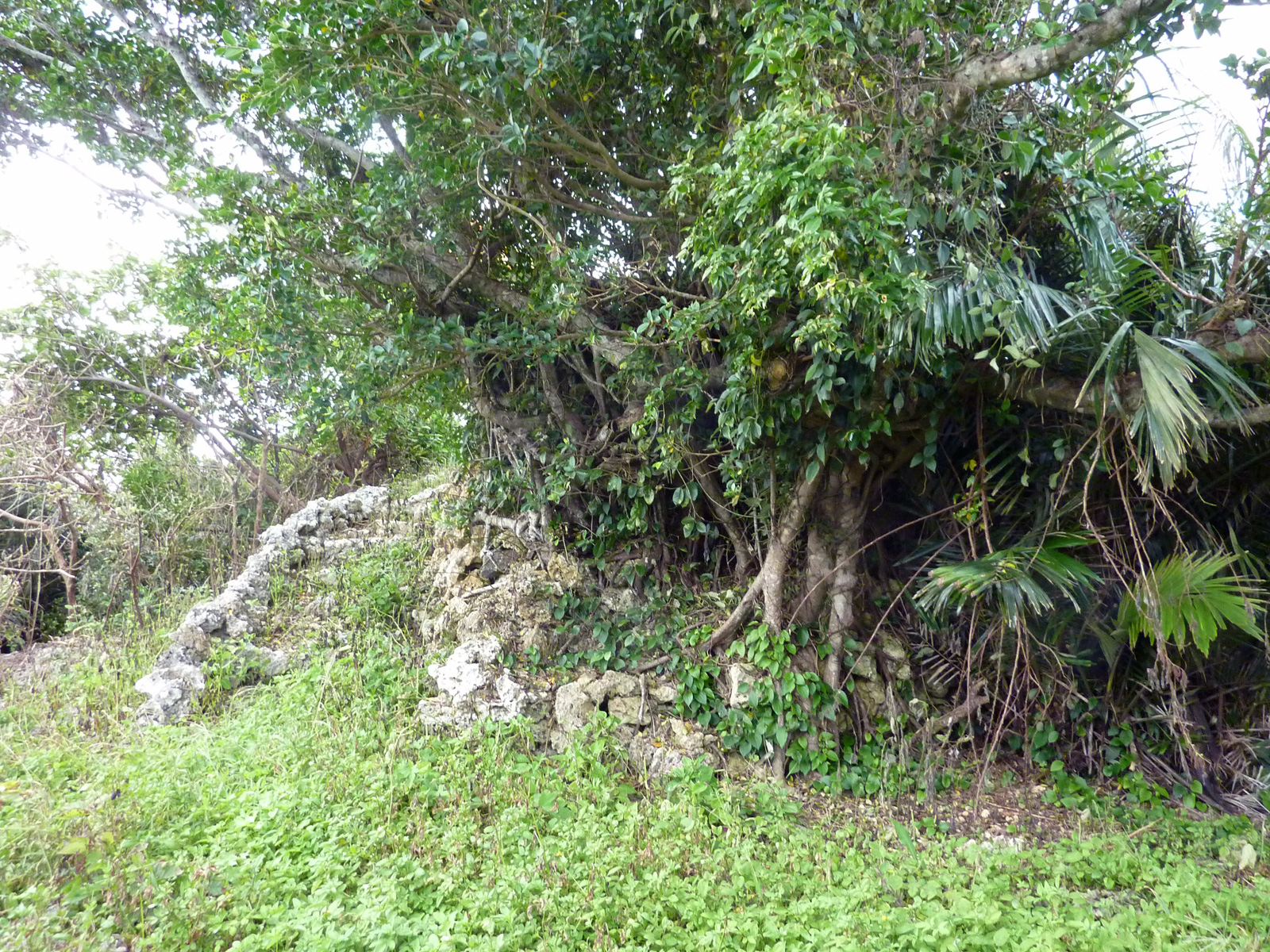
Kurima Tomi (Miyakojima City)

The Miyakojima City Tropical Plant Garden (宮古島市熱帯植物園, Miyakojima-shi Nettai Shokubutsuen) is a botanical garden in Hirara, Miyako-jima, Okinawa Prefecture, Japan.

Landscaping began in 1967 on a site that before the war was a forest of Ryūkyū pines. The garden now contains about 1,600 species of plant and 40,000 trees in an area of 120,000 m^{2}.

The gardens, located at 1166-286 Higashinakasonezoe, are open daily and admission is free.

== See also ==
- List of botanical gardens in Japan
