= Shimoji, Okinawa =

Dissolved municipality in Okinawa prefecture, Japan

Shimoji (下地町, Shimoji-chō), (Miyako: Sїmuzї) was a town located in Miyako District, Okinawa Prefecture, Japan.

== Population ==
As of 2003, the town had an estimated population of 3,200 and a density of 135.25 per km^{2}. The total area was 23.66 km^{2}.

== History ==
On October 1, 2005, Shimoji, along with the city of Hirara, and the towns of Gusukube and Irabu, and the village of Ueno (all from Miyako District), was merged to create the city of Miyakojima.
