= Marksburg =

Castle in Braubach, Rhineland-Palatinate, Germany

Coordinates: 50°16′18.50″N 7°38′57.00″E

- Braubach
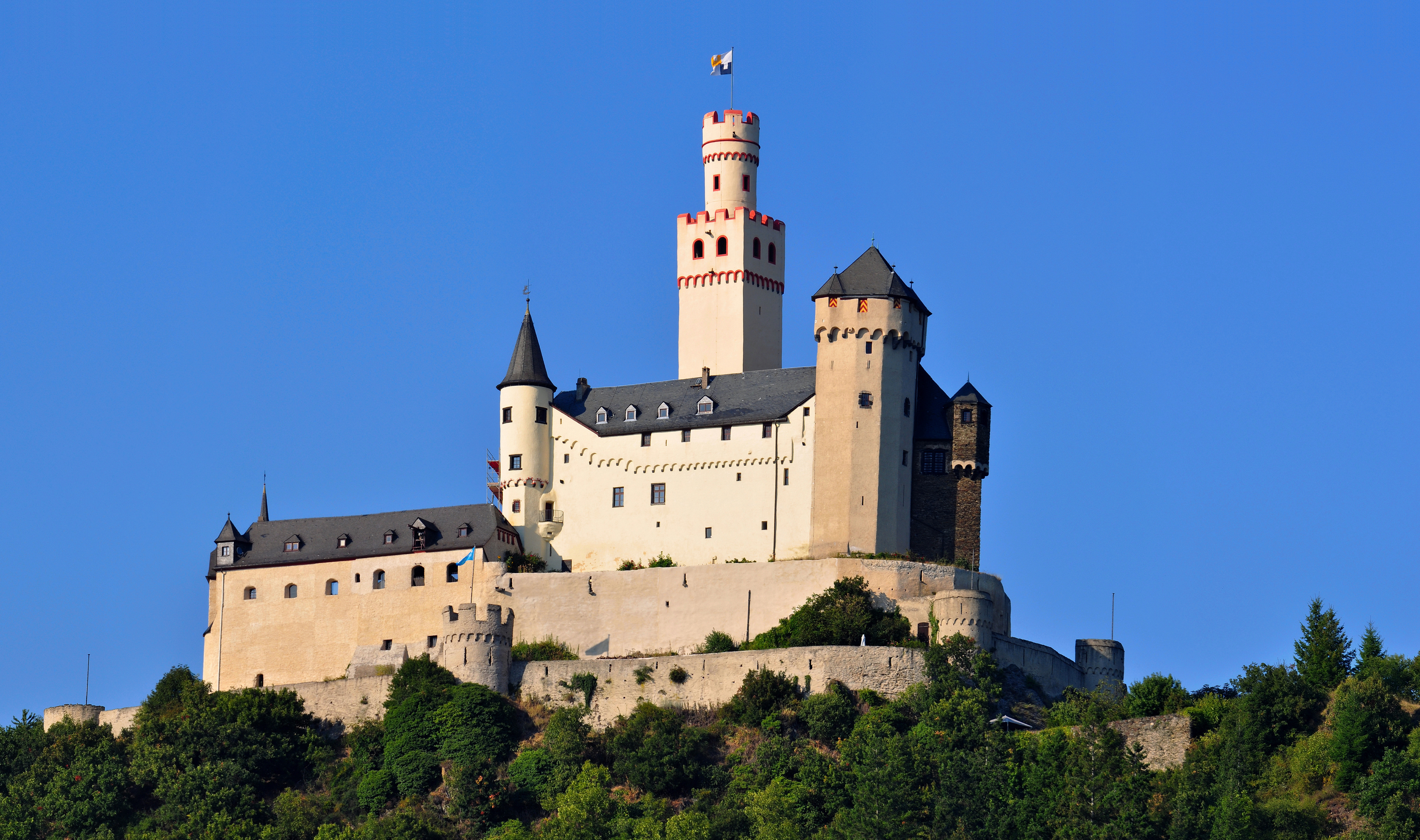
- The Marksburg, from Braubach

Site information
- Type: Medieval castle
- Open to the public: yes

Location
- Height: 160m.

Site history
- Built: 1117
- Built by: House Eppstein

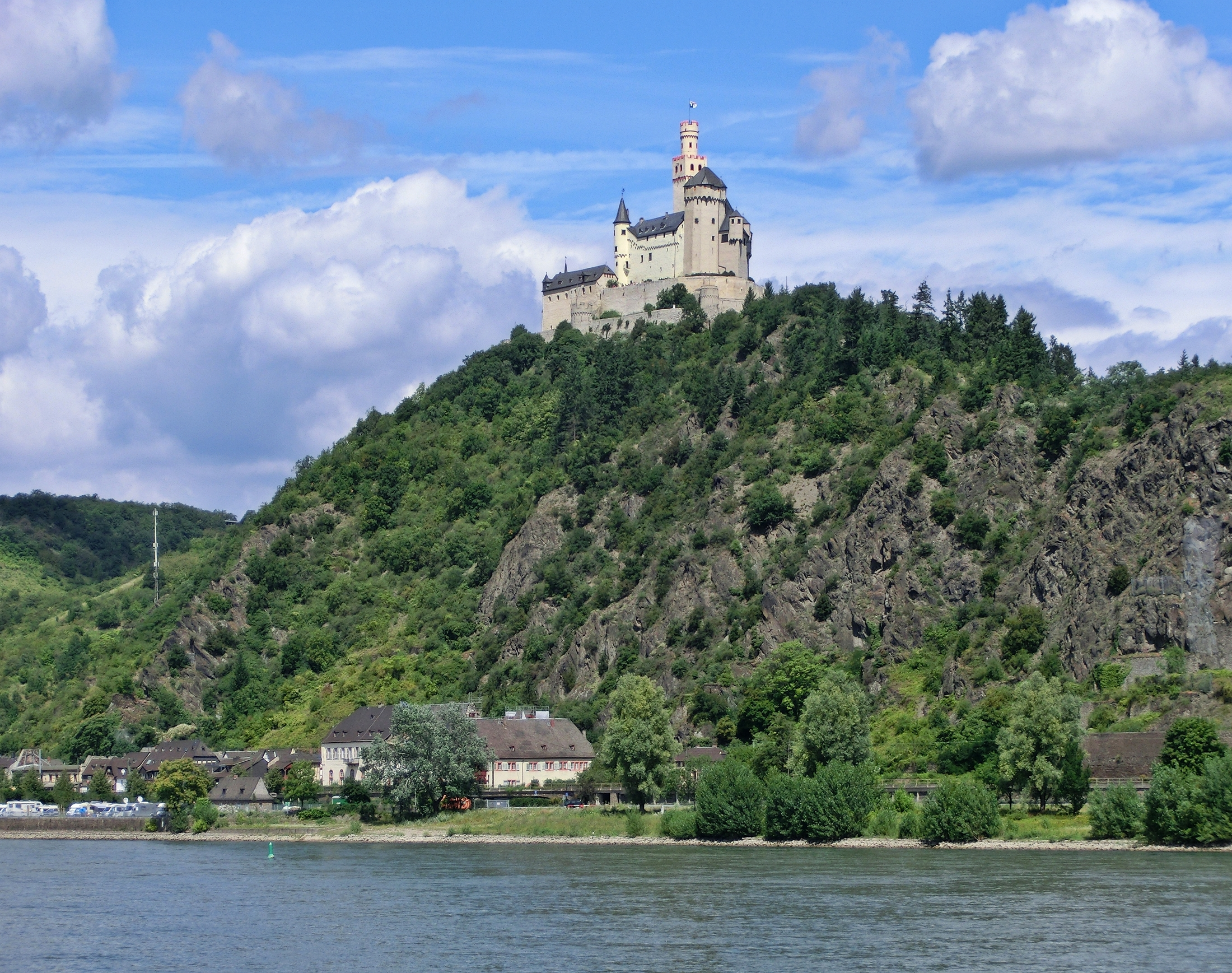
Marksburg and the river Rhine

The Marksburg (German pronunciation: [ˈmaʁksbʊʁk]) is a castle above the town of Braubach in Rhineland-Palatinate, Germany. It is one of the principal sites of the Rhine Gorge UNESCO World Heritage Site. The fortress was used for protection rather than as a residence for royal families. It has a striking example of a bergfried designed as a butter-churn tower. Of the 40 hill castles between Bingen am Rhein and Koblenz the Marksburg was one of only two which was never destroyed (the other being Maus Castle), and the only one that never fell into disrepair.

== History ==
=== Middle Ages ===
A fortification was constructed by the "noble freemen of Braubach" around 1117 to protect the town of Braubach and to reinforce the customs facilities, although this stronghold may have been in the town below. A castle on the hill is first explicitly mentioned in documents in 1231, the possession of the Lords of Eppstein. The oldest datable elements at the site (the base of the keep and the lower part of the original hall) were only constructed in 1239, based on the dendrochronology of the wooden beams. However, the foundations of a Romanesque chapel, which were discovered in 2014, appear to be of 12th century date, which suggests an earlier complex of which no trace remains today.

The Eppsteins were an influential family in the region, with several members becoming archbishops in Mainz and Trier. Their fortress at Braubach was a characteristic Staufer-era castle, a three-story tower keep and a simple hall within a triangular curtain wall. The Eppsteins died out in 1283, and Count Eberhard of Katzenelnbogen inherited it through his wife; throughout the 14th century the wealthy and powerful counts expanded and elaborated the defenses, creating most of the castle we see today. Ca. 1340 they built the Gothic interior chapel, dedicated to St Mark, from which the casrtle derived its present name.

In 1429 the male line of the Counts of Katzenelnbogen became extinct, and the territories went to the Landgraves of Hesse, who would expand the castle to accommodate artillery and add the pointed bastions and round towers of the outer curtain wall.

=== 19th century ===
The French emperor Napoleon seized then abolished the Holy Roman Empire in 1806. He gave the Marksburg to his ally the Duke of Nassau for his service. He used the castle as a prison and as a home for disabled soldiers. After the Austro-Prussian War of 1866 the Duchy of Nassau became a territory of Prussia, which took ownership of the Marksburg.

=== Modern era ===
In 1900, the castle was sold for a symbolic price of 1,000 Goldmarks to the German Castles Association (Deutschen Burgenvereinigung), which had been founded a year earlier as a private initiative to preserve castles in Germany. The Marksburg has been the head office of this organisation since 1931.

In March 1945, the castle was badly damaged by American artillery from across the Rhine.

In the 1990s, a copy of the Marksburg was created for the Ueno German Culture Village in Japan.

The Marksburg appears in the online physics game Cat Around Europe.

== Sources ==
- de Fabianis, Valeria, ed. (2013). Castles of the World. New York: Metro Books. ISBN 978-1-4351-4845-1
