= German Castles Association =

Conservation organisation in Germany

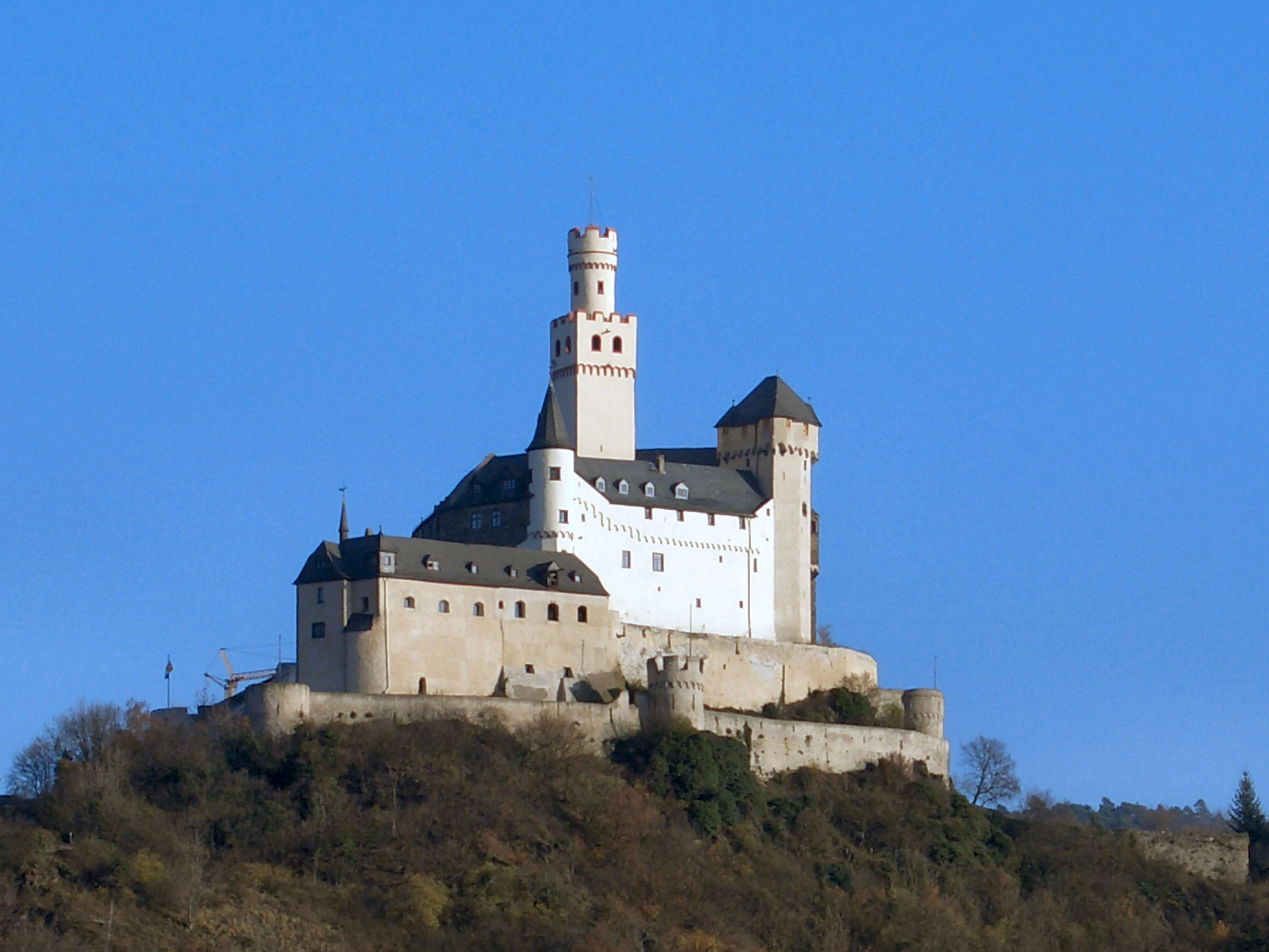
The Marksburg at Braubach, head office of the German Castles Association

The German Castles Association (German: Deutsche Burgenvereinigung) or DBV is dedicated to the conservation of historic defensive and residential buildings as witnesses of history and culture and has its headquarters at Marksburg Castle above Braubach on the Rhine. It owns the organisation known as the European Castles Institute (Europäisches Burgeninstitut) or (EBI) whose library and archives are housed in Philippsburg Palace in Braubach.

== See also ==
- Schweizerischer Burgenverein
- Südtiroler Burgeninstitut
