= Schweizerischer Burgenverein =

Schweizerischer Burgenverein is a Swiss voluntary association dedicated to the study and preservation of medieval castles in Switzerland.

Established in 1927 as Schweizerische Vereinigung zur Erhaltung der Burgen und Ruinen ("Swiss association for the preservation of castles and ruins"; the current name was adopted in 1959), its original purpose was the securing of castle ruins to prevent their further decay. Under the presidency of Hugo Schneider (1955–1972), the focus shifted on archaeological research, including the first systematic excavations of many sites earlier acquired by the association. Since 1975, the association has been a member of the Swiss Academy of Humanities and Social Sciences.

During its earlier history, the association served an important function in the preservation of the historical record and archaeological research, a role which was increasingly taken over by state-financed cantonal offices for archaeology since the 1970s, causing the Burgenverein to shift its focus to scientific publication (a journal on medieval archaeology, Schweizer Beiträge zur Kulturgeschichte und Archäologie des Mittelalters, ISSN 1661-4550, since 1974) and education of the general public (the magazine Mittelalter – Moyen Age – Medioevo – Temp Medieval appeared since 1996). The association reported a number of 1,200 members as of 2013.

== See also ==
- List of castles and fortresses in Switzerland
