= Irabu, Okinawa =

Dissolved municipality in Okinawa prefecture, Japan

Irabu (伊良部町, Irabu-chō; Miyako: Irav) was a town located in Miyako District, Okinawa Prefecture, Japan.

As of 2003, the town had an estimated population of 6,577 and a density of 167.78 persons per km^{2}. The total area was 39.20 km^{2}.

On October 1, 2005, Irabu, along with the city of Hirara, the towns of Gusukube and Shimoji, and the village of Ueno (all from Miyako District), were merged to create the city of Miyakojima.

== Climate ==
Climate data for Irabu (1981−2010 normals, extremes 1978−2009)
Month	Jan	Feb	Mar	Apr	May	Jun	Jul	Aug	Sep	Oct	Nov	Dec	Year
Record high °C (°F)	27.8 (82.0)	27.5 (81.5)	29.5 (85.1)	30.2 (86.4)	32.2 (90.0)	33.8 (92.8)	35.0 (95.0)	35.1 (95.2)	33.9 (93.0)	31.8 (89.2)	31.2 (88.2)	28.9 (84.0)	35.1 (95.2)
Mean daily maximum °C (°F)	20.2 (68.4)	20.6 (69.1)	22.4 (72.3)	24.9 (76.8)	27.4 (81.3)	29.8 (85.6)	31.7 (89.1)	31.2 (88.2)	30.0 (86.0)	27.8 (82.0)	24.9 (76.8)	21.7 (71.1)	26.1 (78.9)
Daily mean °C (°F)	17.8 (64.0)	18.1 (64.6)	19.8 (67.6)	22.3 (72.1)	24.7 (76.5)	27.2 (81.0)	28.8 (83.8)	28.3 (82.9)	27.2 (81.0)	25.2 (77.4)	22.5 (72.5)	19.5 (67.1)	23.5 (74.2)
Mean daily minimum °C (°F)	15.5 (59.9)	15.8 (60.4)	17.2 (63.0)	19.9 (67.8)	22.3 (72.1)	25.1 (77.2)	26.4 (79.5)	25.9 (78.6)	24.8 (76.6)	23.1 (73.6)	20.5 (68.9)	17.3 (63.1)	21.2 (70.1)
Record low °C (°F)	6.9 (44.4)	6.3 (43.3)	5.1 (41.2)	10.0 (50.0)	14.3 (57.7)	16.3 (61.3)	22.0 (71.6)	21.5 (70.7)	17.5 (63.5)	16.7 (62.1)	10.0 (50.0)	6.4 (43.5)	5.1 (41.2)
Average precipitation mm (inches)	116.9 (4.60)	122.4 (4.82)	128.6 (5.06)	152.1 (5.99)	184.6 (7.27)	174.3 (6.86)	102.4 (4.03)	208.0 (8.19)	194.6 (7.66)	129.6 (5.10)	116.1 (4.57)	129.0 (5.08)	1,758.4 (69.23)
Average precipitation days (≥ 1.0 mm)	12.9	11.7	12.9	10.2	10.7	10.4	9.2	12.3	11.9	9.2	11.1	10.5	133
Mean monthly sunshine hours	93.9	94.6	125.0	127.8	130.0	150.7	208.1	210.6	189.2	170.3	128.3	111.5	1,740
Source: JMA
