= Masanobu Kikukawa =

Okinawan karateka

- Born: 1954 (age 71–72); Miyakojima, Okinawa, Japan
- Style: Shorin-ryu Shinkokai
- Teachers: Sokuichi Gibu, Seiki Toma, Ikehara
- Rank: Hanshi, 10 Dan

Other information
- Website: www.kiku.ca

Masanobu Kikukawa (喜久川 政信) is a Japanese martial artist and chairman of the Shorin-ryu Shinkokai style of Okinawan Karate.

Kikukawa was a longtime student of Sokuichi Gibu-hanshi (or "Grand Master Sokuichi Gibu") and Seiki Toma-hanshi. After withdrawal from Gibu's association in 1985, Kikukawa co-founded the Shinkokai association along with colleague Tatsunori Azuma in 1985. In the early 1990s, Kikukawa emigrated to Victoria, British Columbia where he founded the Canadian division of the Shinkokai association, while Tatunori Azuma(東辰徳 1952~2012) continued representing the organization in Okinawa. Kikukawa opened an acupuncture clinic in Surrey; he works with a group of family practitioners in Victoria.
