= Miyakojima, Okinawa =

City in Okinawa Prefecture, Japan

Miyakojima 宮古島市 Myaaku, Naaku
- City
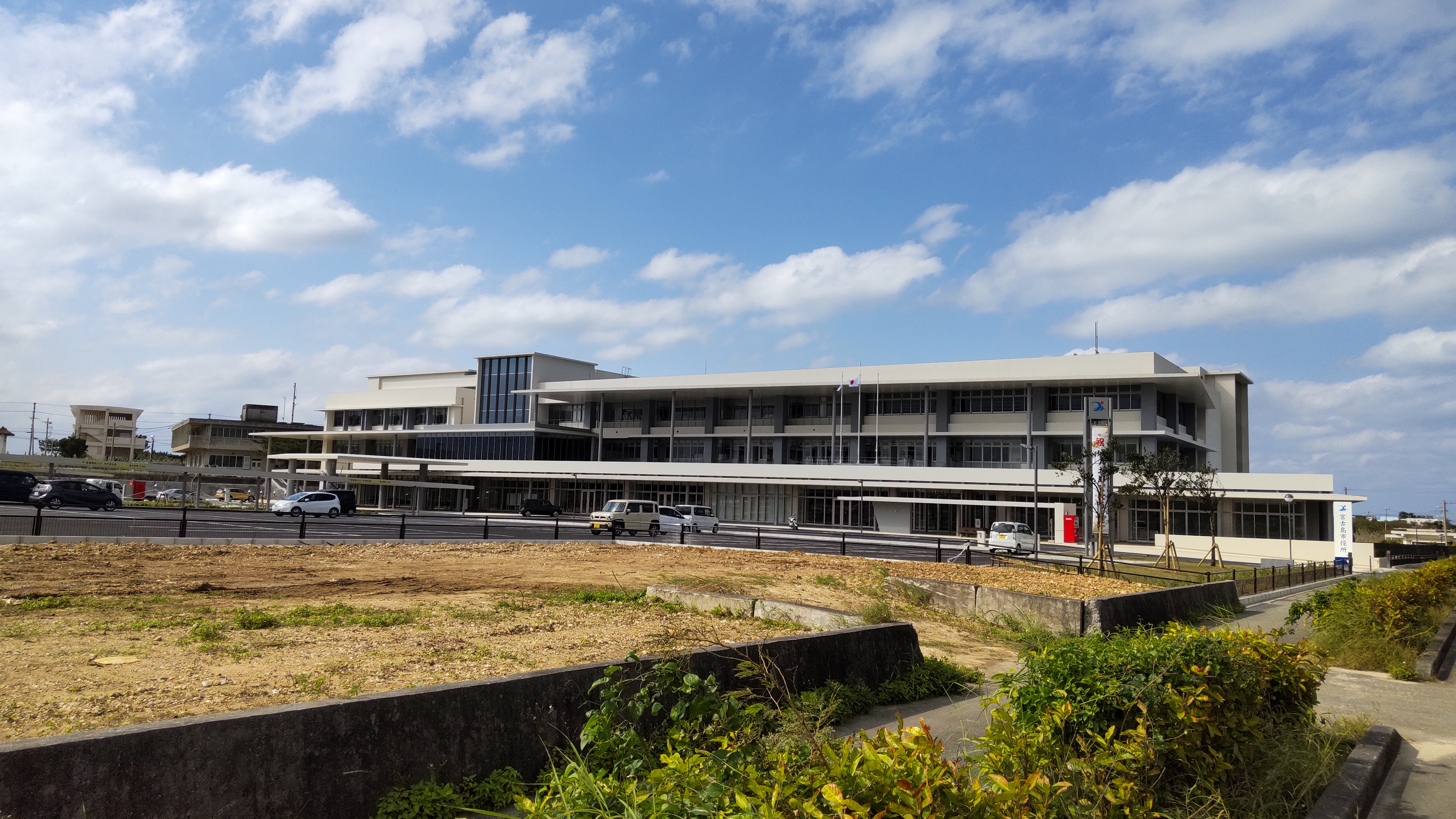
- Miyakojima City Hall

- Flag Seal

- Outline of Miyakojima (in red) in Okinawa Prefecture

- Location of Miyakojima in Okinawa Prefecture
- Coordinates: 24°48′20″N 125°16′52″E
- Country: Japan
- Region: Kyushu (Okinawa)
- Prefecture: Okinawa Prefecture

Government
  - Mayor: Noboru Kakazu

Area
  - Total: 204.54 km^{2} (78.97 sq mi)

Population (February 1, 2025)
  - Total: 53,035
  - Density: 268.45/km^{2} (695.3/sq mi)
- Time zone: UTC+9 (Japan Standard Time)
  - Tree: Banyan
  - Flower: Bougainvillea and tiger's claw
  - Bird: Grey-faced buzzard
  - Butterfly: Paper kite
  - Fish: Double-lined fusilier (Pterocaesio digramma)
  - Shell: Chiragra spider conch (Lambis chiragra)
- Phone number: 0980-72-3751
- Address: 186 Hirara Nishizato, Miyakojima-shi 906-8501
- Climate: Af
- Website: www.city.miyakojima.lg.jp(in Japanese)

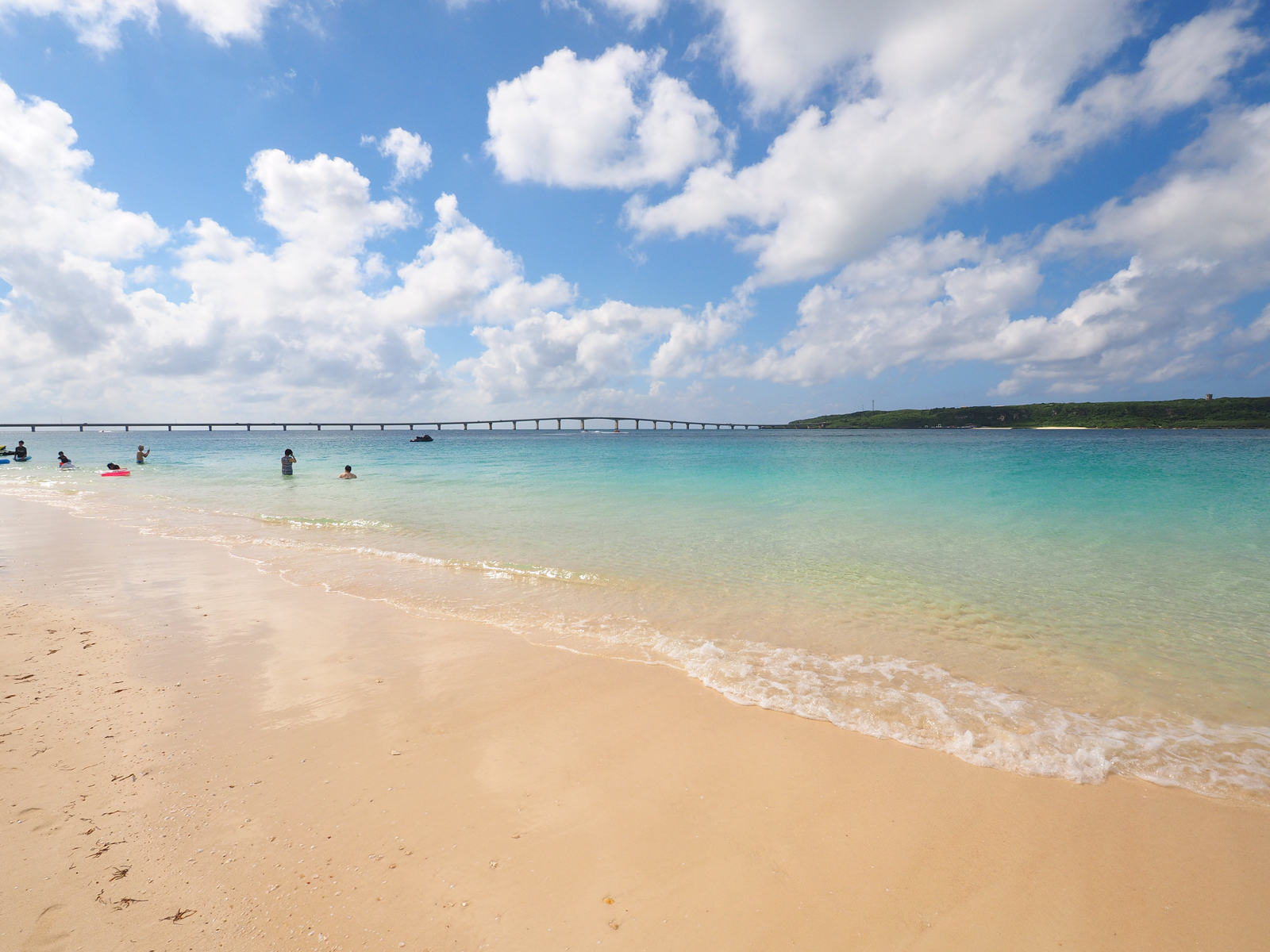
Maipama Beach in Miyakojima

Miyakojima (Japanese: 宮古島市, Hepburn: Miyakojima-shi; Miyako: Myaaku; Okinawan: Naaku) is a city in Okinawa Prefecture, Japan, located on the Miyako Islands. As of 2025, the city had a population of 53,035.

== History ==
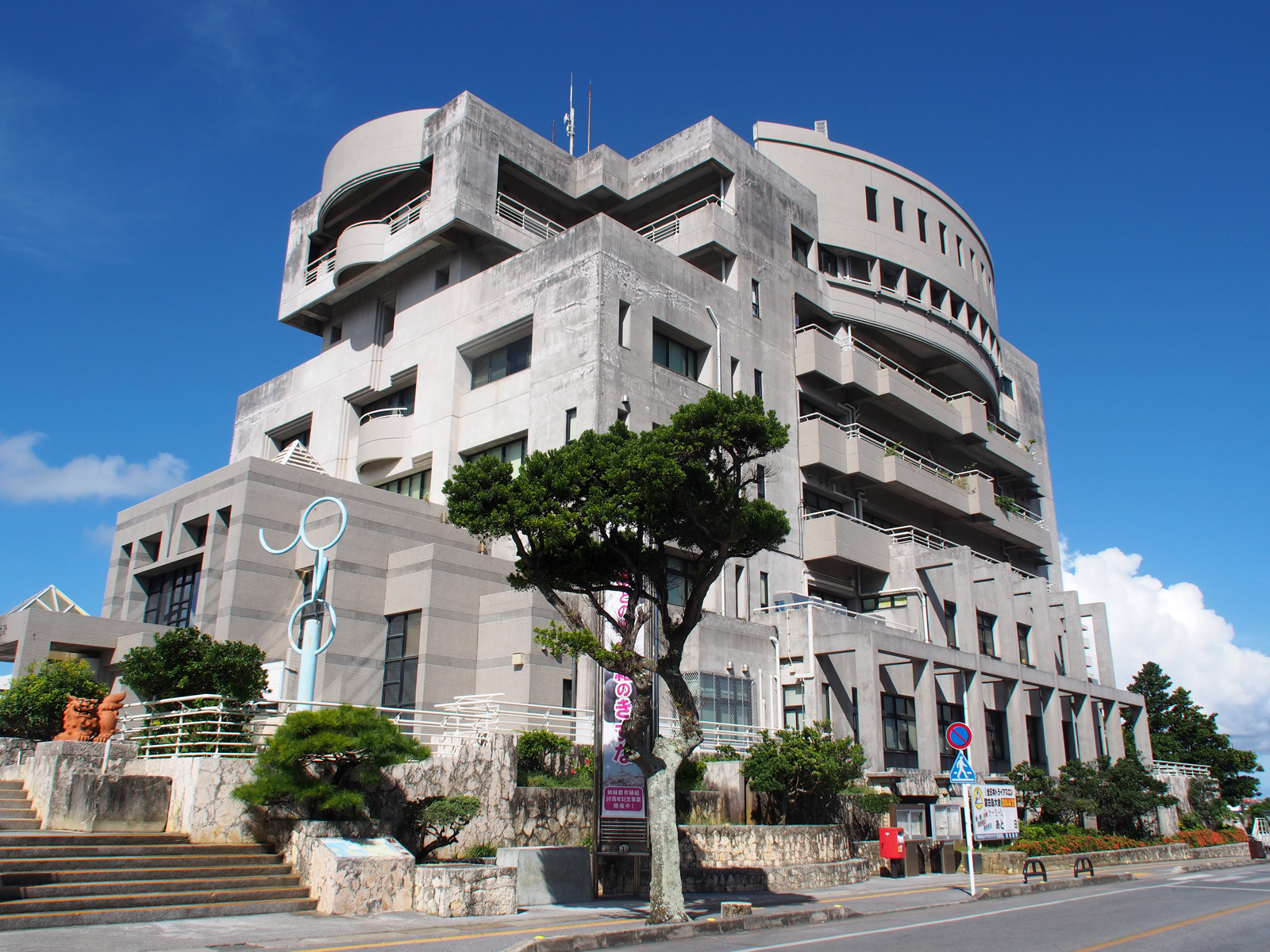
Former Miyakojima City Hall Hirara Building

The modern city of Miyakojima was established on October 1, 2005, from the merger of the old city of Hirara, the towns of Gusukube, Irabu and Shimoji, and the village of Ueno (all from Miyako District). As a result of the merger, Miyako District only has one remaining village.

== Geography ==
Since the city was created by merging several towns that were located on different islands, the city of Miyakojima consists of multiple islands. The islands administered by the city include:

- Ikema-jima
- Irabu-jima
- Kurima-jima
- Miyako-jima
- Ōgami-jima
- Shimojishima

Several of the islands are connected by bridge.

- Miyako-jima and Ikema-jima
- Miyako-jima and Kurima-jima
- Miyako-jima and Irabu-jima
- Irabu-jima and Shimojishima: connected by six bridges (they are very close together)

Ogami-jima is the only island that is not connected by bridge and must be reached by boat.

=== Administrative divisions ===
The city includes forty-one wards repartited into the five former municipalities.

==== Gusukube ====
- Aragusuku (新城)
- Bora (保良)
- Fukuzato (福里)
- Higa (比嘉)
- Nagama (長間)
- Nishizatosoe (西里添)
- Shimozato (下里)
- Shimozatosoe (下里添)
- Tomori (友利)

==== Hirara ====
- Higashinakasone (東仲宗根)
- Higashinakasonezoe (東仲宗根添)
- Ikema (池間)
- Karimata (狩俣)
- Kugai (久貝)
- Maezato (前里)
- Matsubara (松原)
- Nikadori (荷川取)
- Nishihara (西原)
- Nishinakasone (西仲宗根)
- Nishizato (西里)
- Ōgami (大神)
- Ōura (大浦)
- Shimajiri (島尻)
- Shimosato (下里)

==== Irabu ====
- Ikemasoe (池間添)
- Irabu (伊良部)
- Kuninaka (国仲)
- Maezatozoe (前里添)
- Nagahama (長浜)
- Nakachi (仲地)
- Sawada (佐和田)

==== Shimoji ====
- Kadekari (嘉手苅)
- Kawamitsu (川満)
- Kurima (来間)
- Sugama (洲鎌)
- Uechi (上地)
- Yonaha (与那覇)

==== Ueno ====
- Miyaguni (宮国)
- Nobaru (野原)
- Shinzato (新里)
- Ueno (上野)

== Demographics ==
As of December 2012 the city has an estimated population of 54,908 and a population density of 268.45 per km^{2}. The total area is 204.54 km^{2}. The city had 24,728 households. This makes it the ninth-largest city in Okinawa Prefecture.

== Government ==
=== National government ===
The city, along with the cities of Ishigaki, Itoman, and Tomigusuku, lies in Okinawa 4th district, which elects one representative to the House of Representatives (lower house). The current representative is Kosaburo Nishime of the Liberal Democratic Party. The entire prefecture of Okinawa elects two representatives (one each three years) to the House of Councillors (upper house). The current representatives are:

- Yōichi Iha (member of the Okinawa Whirlwind Party). First elected in 2016, term ends in 2022.
- Tetsumi Takara (member of the Okinawa Whirlwind Party). First elected in 2019, term ends in 2025.

=== Prefectural government ===
The city forms most of the "Miyakojima constituency" (along with Tarama island) and elects two members to the Okinawa Prefectural Assembly. Representatives are elected for a term of 4 years.

=== Local government ===
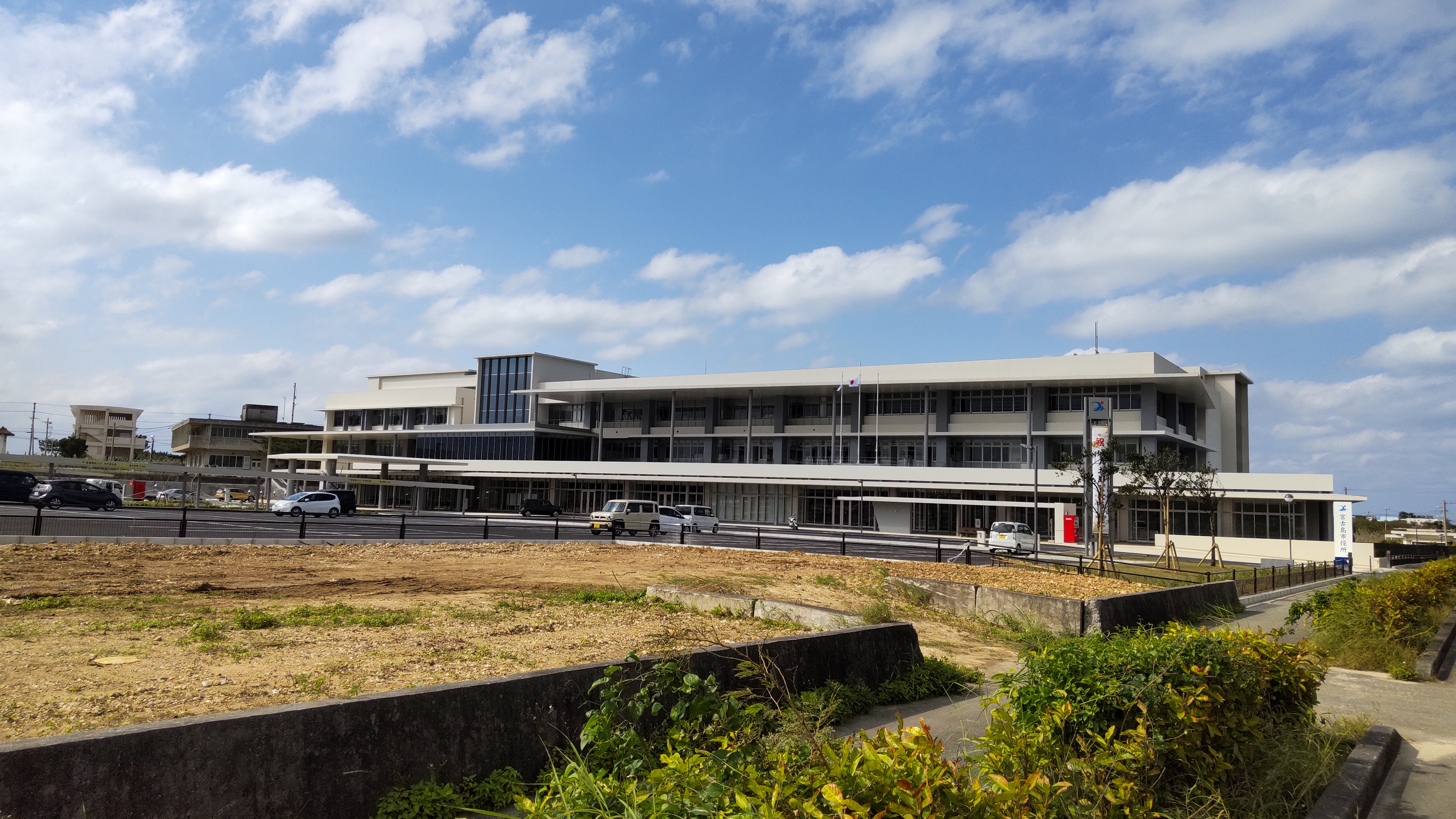
Miyakojima City Hall

==== Mayor ====
The current mayor of Miyakojima is Kazuyuki Zakimi (born 1949). He took office on January 25, 2021, after defeating the incumbent Toshihiko Shimoji (born 1945) on the January 17, 2021 election. Zakimi was endorsed by the Constitutional Democratic Party and the Japanese Communist Party, while Shimoji was endorsed by the Liberal Democratic Party and Komeito.

Previous mayors of the city (since the 2005 merger) include:

- Akira Ishimine (2005–08). Resigned due to scandal.
- Toshihiko Shimoji (2008–21). Defeated in election.

==== City council ====
The Miyakojima City Council consists of 24 people. Most formally register as independent but are members of a caucus.

Number of members by formal party affiliation:

- Independent/no affiliation: 20
- Japanese Communist Party: 1
- Komeito: 2
- Liberal Democratic Party: 1

== Transportation ==
The city of Miyakojima is served by two airports. Miyako Airport (MMY), the main commercial airport, is located on Miyako Island; and Shimoji Airport, initially a private field, is now a Class 3 facility operated by the prefectural government located on Shimojishima. This nearby island is close enough to be connected by a causeway bridge to the larger Miyako Island.

== Economy ==
Agriculture and livestock are the core financial industries in Miyakojima, with the main exports consisting of sugar cane, tobacco, cattle, and mango. Fisheries and seaweed farms, producing species such as mozuku and sea lettuce, can be found in and around areas like Ikemajima and Irabujima. However, each year more and more land formerly used for agriculture is being sold and converted into residential and retail buildings.

The tourism industry is a steadily growing component of Miyakojima's economy. Traveling to the islands is facilitated primarily through airlines and cruise lines. With the addition of international flights made available through the opening of Shimoji Airport in 2019, flights connecting to Miyako have been increasing – over 730,000 plane tickets entering into Miyakojima were purchased in 2019 alone. Since 2016 cruises have been a significant catalyst to Miyakojima's tourism industry, notably megaships servicing international tourists. Efforts to introduce space travel have also been announced, as PD Aerospace proposes to create a spaceport at Shimojijima airport and begin flights in 2025. The islands are popular tourist destinations because of the clear blue sea and white beaches. There are several golf clubs on the islands.

There are six breweries on the islands and a chemical plant that converts sugar cane into ethanol.

== Facilities ==
=== Education ===
There are a total of 3 high schools in the city, including one technical high school and one business high school.

There are 13 middle schools, including one that has been recently closed, and one special school for the intellectually disabled.

There are two schools that are both elementary and middle schools.

There are 15 elementary schools.

=== Medical ===
There are two hospitals: one public, and one private.

=== Museum ===
There is one museum, the Miyakojima City Museum.

=== Meeting venues ===
There are five community centers, one municipal theater, a City Hall, three "Remote Island Promotion Centers" (one each for Ikemajima, Irabujima, and Kurimajima), and three "Rural Environment Improvement Centers".

=== Gymnasium/Athletic Center ===
There are two gymnasiums, three baseball fields, three other athletic fields, and two "physical education centers".

== Transportation ==
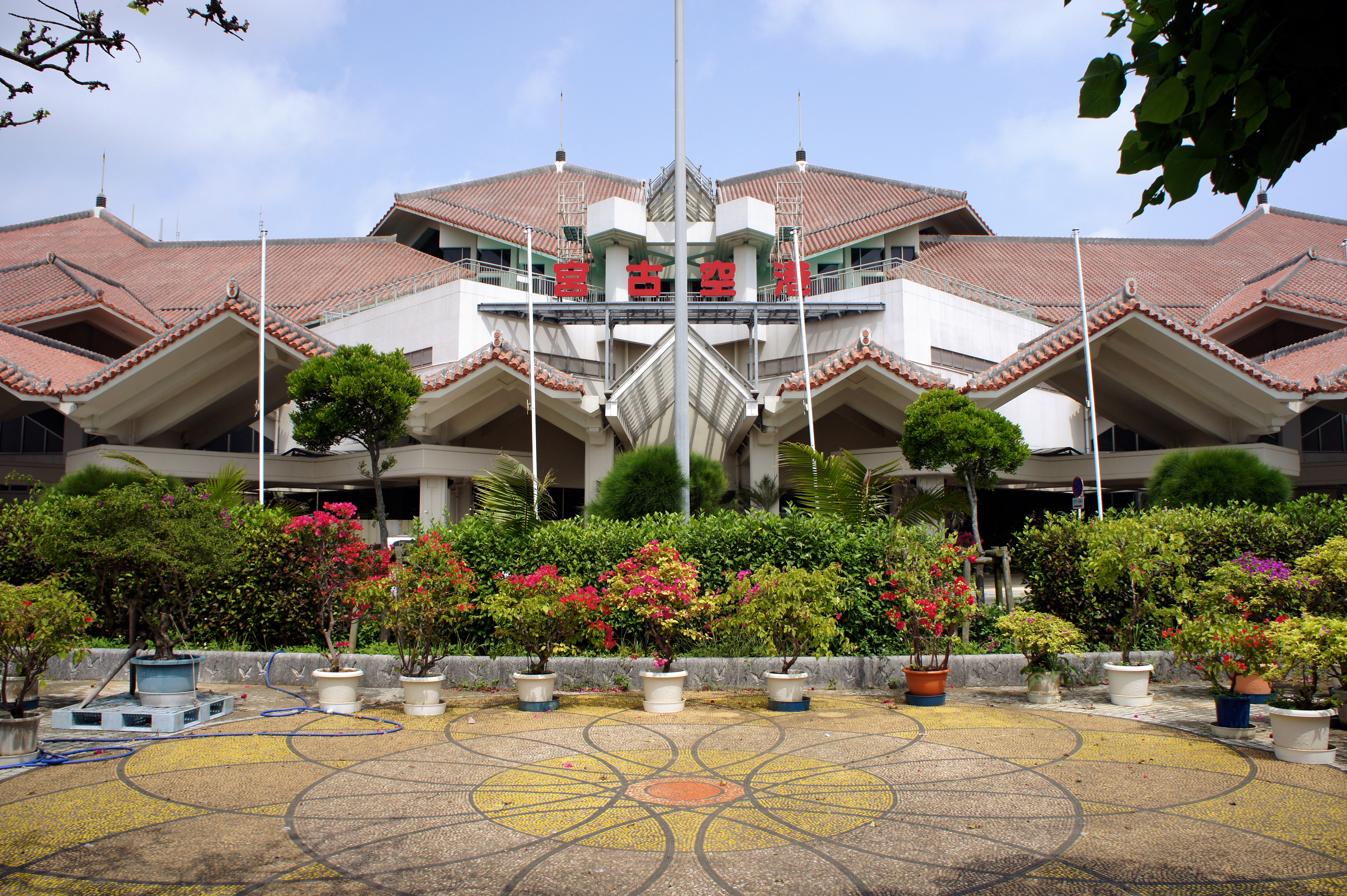
Miyako Airport

=== Airports ===
There are two airports: Miyako Airport and Shimojishima Airport.

=== Ports ===
There are four ports:

- Hirara Port (central port)
- Kuruma Port
- Nagayama Port (on Irabujima)
- Sarahama Port (on Irabujima)

Most boat travel takes place between one of the ports and Futenma port on the Island of Okinawa. There is also travel between Miyako Island and Ogamijima, the only island that is not connected by bridge.

=== Roads ===
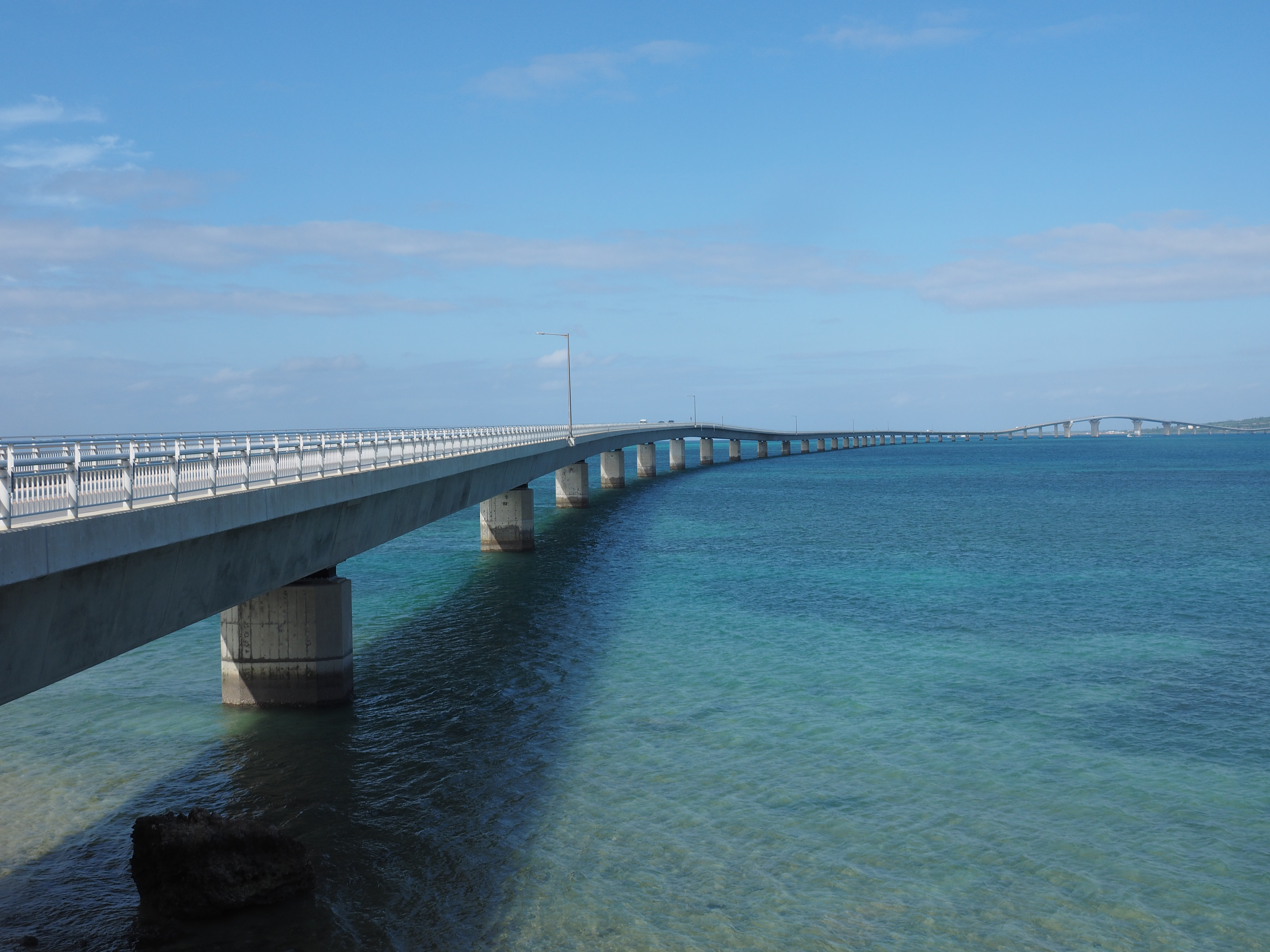
Irabu Bridge

Part of Japanese National Highway 390 runs across the island. The highway consists of two sections: a section that transverses Ishigaki Island, and the section that transverses Miyako Island. The two sections used to be connected by boat, but boat service was discontinued and now the two sections of the highway are disconnected.

Numerous prefectural roads traverse the islands.

=== Bus ===
Bus services are provided by four bus operators, that service a total of nine lines:

- Chuo Kotsu (from Miyakojima to Shimojishima)
- Kyowa Bus (from Miyakojima to Irabujima)
- Miyako Kyoei Bus (route from Miyakojima to Kurimajima)
- Yachiyo Bus (route from Miyakojima to Ikemajima)

== Media ==
=== Newspapers ===
There are two major newspapers in the city:

- Miyako Mainichi Shimbun
- Miyako Shinpo

=== Broadcast ===
- SInce 2018, FM Okinawa can be received in the city.
- Miyako TV (Cable TV): Opened as Miyakojima Cable TV in 1978.
- There are FM relay stations of Ryukyu Broadcasting (RBCi Radio) and Radio Okinawa (ROK).
- Until 1992, commercial TV could not be broadcast live in the city because there was no relay station (broadcast had to be recorded and then broadcast with a delay). After the relay station opened, Miyako TV began broadcasting commercial TV.
- Miyako Television has the Nippon Television Network and the transmission equipment of TV Asahi.

== Communication ==
=== Mail ===
Mail collection and delivery is handled by the Miyako Post Office. There are several other smaller post offices that people use to drop off mail.

=== Phone ===
The entire city has the same area code: 0980 (since 2002).

== Climate ==
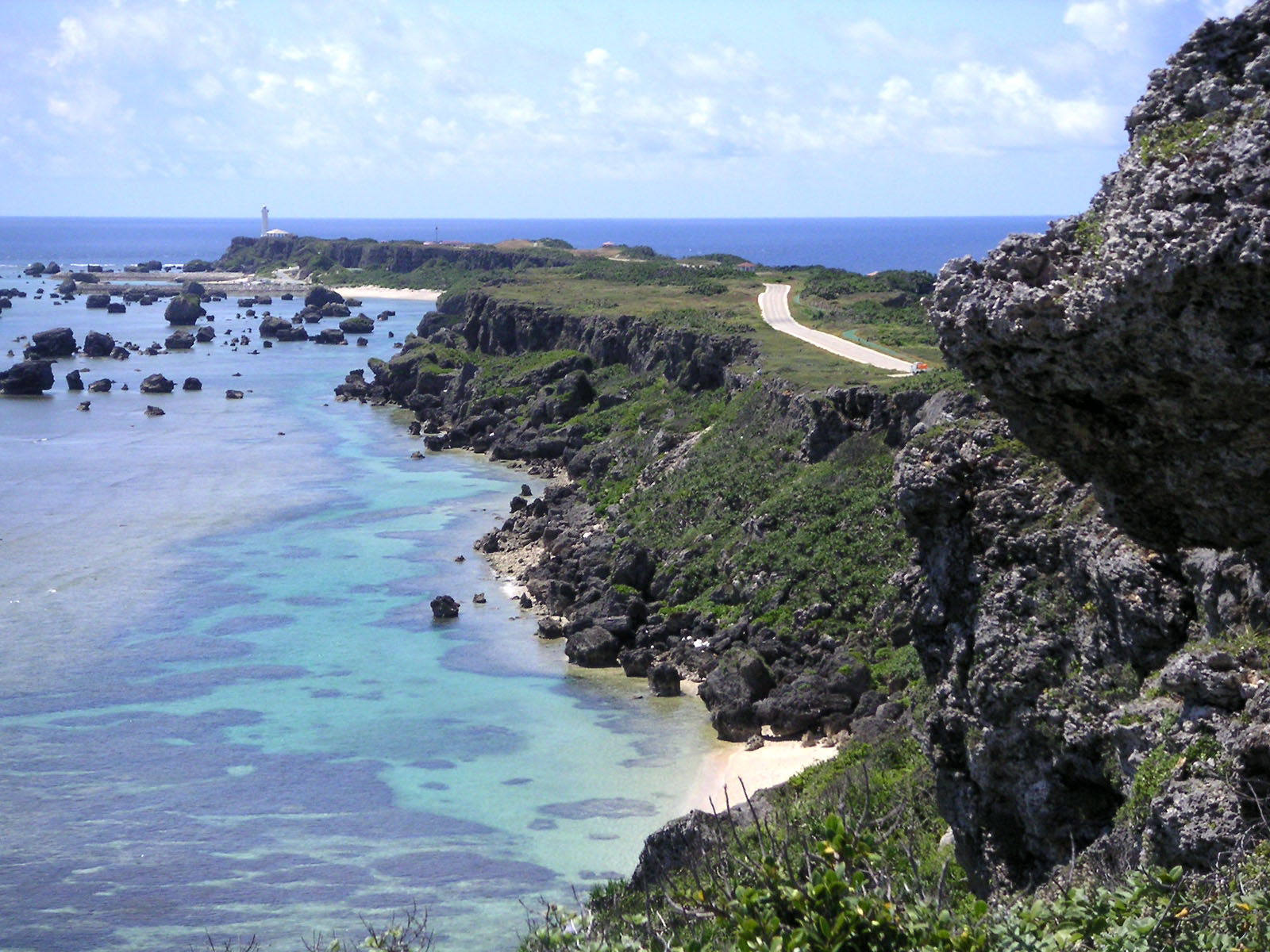
Higashi-Hennazaki

The climate of Miyakojima is a monsoon-influenced tropical rainforest climate (Köppen climate classification Af), closely bordering on a humid subtropical climate (Köppen climate classification Cfa) with the average temperature of the coldest month being just above 18 °C. Precipitation is abundant throughout the year; August is the wettest month, and January and July are the driest.

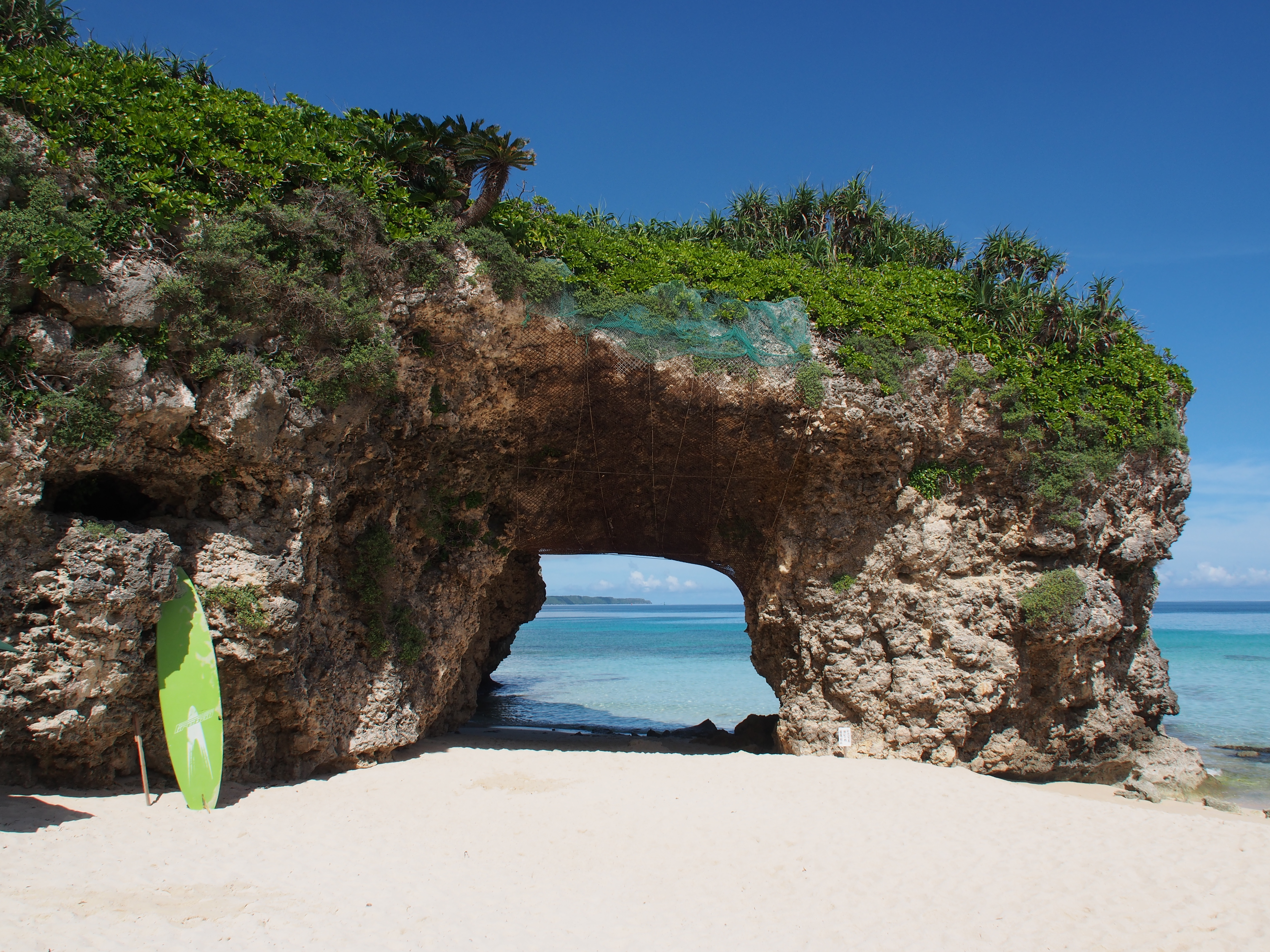
Miyako Sunayama Beach

Climate data for Miyakojima (1991–2020 normals, extremes 1937–present)
Month	Jan	Feb	Mar	Apr	May	Jun	Jul	Aug	Sep	Oct	Nov	Dec	Year
Record high °C (°F)	27.0 (80.6)	27.6 (81.7)	28.6 (83.5)	30.7 (87.3)	33.3 (91.9)	35.1 (95.2)	35.3 (95.5)	34.2 (93.6)	34.2 (93.6)	32.5 (90.5)	30.9 (87.6)	28.8 (83.8)	35.3 (95.5)
Mean daily maximum °C (°F)	20.6 (69.1)	21.1 (70.0)	22.8 (73.0)	25.1 (77.2)	27.7 (81.9)	30.3 (86.5)	31.7 (89.1)	31.3 (88.3)	30.1 (86.2)	27.8 (82.0)	25.3 (77.5)	22.2 (72.0)	26.4 (79.5)
Daily mean °C (°F)	18.3 (64.9)	18.6 (65.5)	20.1 (68.2)	22.5 (72.5)	25.0 (77.0)	27.7 (81.9)	28.9 (84.0)	28.6 (83.5)	27.6 (81.7)	25.5 (77.9)	23.1 (73.6)	20.0 (68.0)	23.8 (74.8)
Mean daily minimum °C (°F)	16.3 (61.3)	16.6 (61.9)	17.9 (64.2)	20.4 (68.7)	23.0 (73.4)	25.7 (78.3)	26.8 (80.2)	26.5 (79.7)	25.6 (78.1)	23.8 (74.8)	21.3 (70.3)	18.2 (64.8)	21.9 (71.4)
Record low °C (°F)	6.9 (44.4)	7.3 (45.1)	8.6 (47.5)	11.4 (52.5)	15.2 (59.4)	17.4 (63.3)	21.4 (70.5)	21.2 (70.2)	19.7 (67.5)	17.2 (63.0)	12.9 (55.2)	9.6 (49.3)	6.9 (44.4)
Average precipitation mm (inches)	138.8 (5.46)	119.8 (4.72)	138.7 (5.46)	148.7 (5.85)	222.3 (8.75)	194.7 (7.67)	151.6 (5.97)	257.4 (10.13)	259.3 (10.21)	157.9 (6.22)	139.8 (5.50)	147.2 (5.80)	2,076 (81.73)
Average snowfall cm (inches)	0 (0)	0 (0)	0 (0)	0 (0)	0 (0)	0 (0)	0 (0)	0 (0)	0 (0)	0 (0)	0 (0)	0 (0)	0 (0)
Average precipitation days (≥ 0.5 mm)	14.3	12.0	12.4	11.3	11.7	11.0	10.6	14.0	13.2	11.2	12.5	13.9	148.2
Average relative humidity (%)	72	74	76	79	82	84	80	81	79	75	74	71	77
Mean monthly sunshine hours	85.5	90.3	116.0	122.9	149.3	191.9	241.0	210.9	179.3	151.9	112.3	92.7	1,743.9
Source: Japan Meteorological Agency

== Environmental initiatives ==
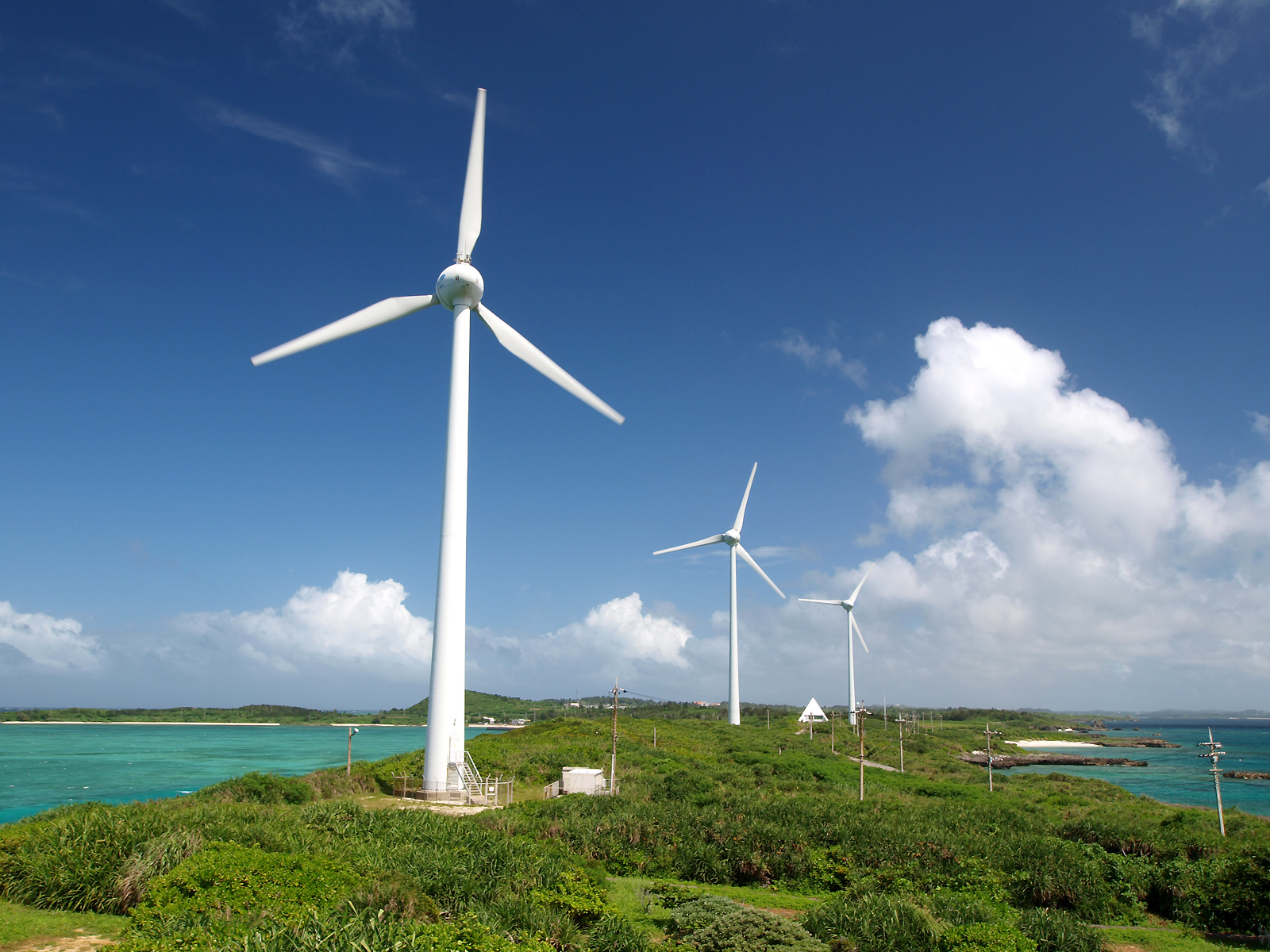
Wind Turbines in Nishi-Hennazaki, Miyakojima

In 2008, the city announced the first "Declaration of Eco Island Miyakojima" with a goal to encourage industrial development and environmental conservation, notably of ground water sources and coral reefs. This initiative was also focused on creating a self-sustaining energy supply primarily through low-cost solar energy.

As of 2009, the city has been certified as an Eco-Model City. A second version of the Declaration of Eco Island Miyakojima was introduced under the slogan "Toward the Future 1,000 Years From Now" in 2018, with an action plan released in 2019. This updated version maintains similar goals with some added initiatives such as the eradication of foreign animal species, namely peacocks, and the reduction of household waste discharge. Under this second declaration, a greater emphasis has been placed on the promotion of these environmental initiatives through actions such as the establishment of an Eco Island Miyakojima brand, the creation of a contests, and the integration of environmental sustainability education into local public schools.

In 2019, the city was awarded a gold medal, also known as the Ministry of Economy Trade and Industry Prize, in the New Energy Awards for its efforts in proliferating solar energy throughout the island.

== German influence ==
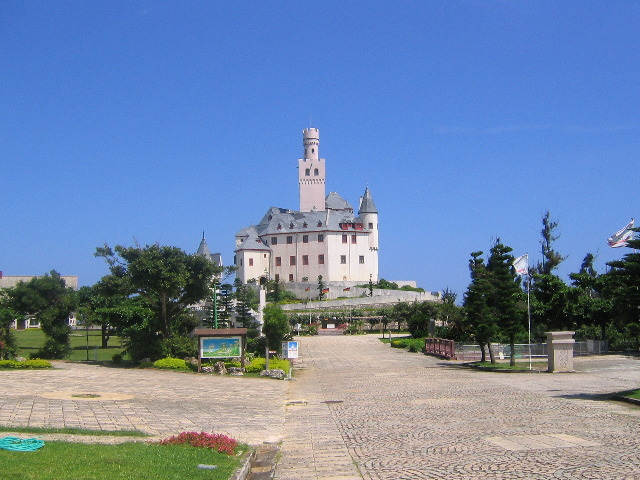
Ueno German Culture Village

In 1873, the German ship Robertson was shipwrecked on Miyako Island. The crew were saved and cared for by the local islanders. As a gift for the islanders' kindness, and as an excuse for German warships to enter Ryūkyūan waters, Kaiser Wilhelm I erected a monument on the island in 1876, known locally as the German Emperor's Tributary Monument or the Friendship Monument. After Japan annexed the Ryūkyū Kingdom, Japan used this as evidence of a history of friendship between Japan and Germany.

In 1987, the Ueno German Culture Village opened in Ueno village, Miyako. Internet websites under the name Ueno German Cultural Village can be easily found, however Ueno Village, Miyako Island, no longer exists as a jurisdiction since, as mentioned above, all of the separate cities, towns and villages on the island were merged into Miyakojima city in 2005.

== Sister cities ==
=== In Japan ===
- Muroran, Hokkaido (since 1998)
- Nishiaizu, Yama, Fukushima
- Joetsu, Niigata
- Setagaya Ward, Tokyo (since 1962)
- Fujieda, Shizuoka (since 2011)
- Shirakawa, Gifu
- Tsuyama, Okayama
- Naruto, Tokushima (since 2003)
- Shirakawa, Kamo, Gifu (since 2004)

=== Outside Japan ===
- Maui County, Hawaii, U.S. (since 1965)
- Keelung City, Taiwan (since 2007)

== Notable residents ==
- Hideki Irabu, baseball player
- Masanobu Kikukawa, martial artist
- Mikio Shimoji, politician
- Katsuyoshi Tomori, golfer
- Kazumasa Uesato, footballer

== Cultural Properties ==
Miyakojima City hosts one hundred and twenty-two designated or registered cultural properties and monuments, at the national, prefectural or municipal level.

- Name (Japanese) (Type of registration)

=== Cultural Properties ===
- Documents relating to the Motomura Family of the Shōei Clan (向裔氏本村家関係資料) (Municipal)
- Documents relating to the Nakasone Family of the Chūdō Clan (忠導氏仲宗根家関係資料) (Municipal)
- Former Nishinaka Sugar Cooperative refinery chimney (旧西中共同製糖場煙突) (National)
- Hirara First Elementary School main gate and stone wall (平良第一小学校の正門と石垣) (Municipal)
- Hisamatsu myāka (megalithic) tomb cluster (久松みゃーか(巨石墓)群) (Municipal)
- Industrial Benefactor Memorial (産業界之恩人記念碑) (Municipal)
- Kawamitsu Family's genealogy (河充氏の系図) (Municipal)
- Motomura Family inscription “報本“(本村家「報本」碑) (Municipal)
- Onga Satonushi Pēchin's tombstone (恩河里之子親雲上の墓碑) (Municipal)
- Ōno drainage tunnel (大野越排水溝) (National)
- Shimoji Family's tomb (下地家の墓) (Municipal)
- Sword and Ancient Document (刀剣及び古文書) (Municipal)
- Tuyumya Tombs (豊見親墓 3基) (National)
- West Tsuga Tomb (西ツガ墓) (Municipal)
- Zuifuku Tunnel (瑞福隧道) (Municipal)

=== Folk Cultural Properties ===
- Agiisu (Strength Competition Stones) of Gusukube (Nanamata, Aragusuku and Nishinaka Settlements) (ぐすくべのアギイス (力石) 3地区) (Municipal)
- Akana-gū Shrine (赤名宮) (Municipal)
- Akazaki Utaki Sacred Site (赤崎御嶽) (Municipal)
- Amagā spring of Tomori in Gusukube (城辺町の友利のあま井) (Prefectural)
- Isū-gā Spring (イスゥガー (磯井)) (Municipal)
- Katsu Fishing Stone Wall (魚垣 (カツ)) (Municipal)
- Kisama Utaki Sacred Site (喜佐真御嶽) (Prefectural)
- Kusu-nu-kā Sacred Well (クスヌカー (後の井)) (Municipal)
- Kyāza-gā Well (キャーザ井) (Municipal)
- Maya Utaki Sacred Site (真屋御嶽) (Municipal)
- Nanamata Miima-gā Spring (七又ミーマガー) (Municipal)
- Nugana-gā Spring (野加那泉) (Municipal)
- Sukapuyā Utaki Sacred Site (スカプヤー御嶽) (Municipal)
- Tsunuji Utaki Sacred Site (ツヌジ御嶽) (Municipal)
- Uipyāmutu Sanctuary (ウイピャームトゥの祭場) (Prefectural)
- Yamagā Upu-kā (山川ウプカー) (Municipal)

=== Historic Sites ===
- Abu-gā spring No. 1 (アブガーNo.1) (Municipal)
- Abu-gā spring No. 2 (アブガーNo.2) (Municipal)
- Ama-gā Spring (アマ井) (Municipal)
- Ana-gā spring (アナ井) (Municipal)
- Ara-gā Well (アラガー) (Municipal)
- Bora-motojima Site (保良元島遺跡) (Municipal)
- Dakifu-gā Well (ダキフガー) (Municipal)
- Edge Stone of the Well of the Matsumura Family (松村家の井戸の縁石) (Municipal)
- Funaha-gā Spring (フナハガー) (Municipal)
- German Emperor's Tributary Monument (ドイツ皇帝博愛記念碑) (Prefectural)
- German shipwreck site stele (ドイツ商船遭難之地碑) (Municipal)
- Harimizu paved road (漲水石畳道) (Municipal)
- Harimizu Utaki Sacred Site and its stone wall (漲水御嶽と石垣) (Municipal)
- Ikeda Bridge in Shimoji (下地町の池田矼) (Prefectural)
- Kagamihara-baba Hippodrome Site (鏡原馬場跡) (Municipal)
- Kanamara-abu Cave (カナマラアブ) (Municipal)
- Kan'nondō Shrine Sacred Mound (観音堂経塚) (Municipal)
- Kanzato-gā spring (神里ガー) (Municipal)
- Kawamitsu Ubutunu Old Tomb (川満大殿の古墓= (Municipal)
- Kinsūkyā-gā spring (金志川泉) (Municipal)
- Kōjin Migagama Utaki Sacred Site (好善ミガガマ御嶽) (Municipal)
- Kubaka Castle Site (クバカ城跡) (Municipal)
- Kurima-gā spring (来間川 (泉)) (Municipal)
- Kurohama Utaki Sacred Site (黒浜御嶽) (Municipal)
- Mamuya's residence, loom location and tomb (マムヤの屋敷跡・機織り場・墓) (Municipal)
- Muika-gā spring (cave spring) (盛加がー (洞井)) (Municipal)
- Nakasone Tuyumya's tomb (仲宗根豊見親の墓) (Prefectural)
- Nakaya-kanamori's myāka tomb (仲屋金盛ミャーカ) (Municipal)
- Navy Secret Suicide Boat Storage Shelter (海軍特攻艇格納秘匿壕) (Municipal)
- Nisumi Utaki Sacred Site (西銘御嶽) (Municipal)
- Noborudake spirit stones (野原岳の霊石・野原の霊石) (Prefectural)
- Nudokubi-abu Cave (ヌドクビアブ) (Municipal)
- Nugusuku-gā spring (野城泉 (ヌグスクガー)) (Municipal)
- Nūshi Utaki Sacred Site (乗瀬御嶽) (Municipal)
- Pinza-abu Site (ピンザアブ遺跡) (Municipal)
- Pyāzu Utaki Sacred Site (ピャーズ御嶽) (Municipal)
- Sabautsu-gā spring (サバウツガー) (Municipal)
- Sakishima Beacons: Ikema Lookout Office (先島諸島火番盛 池間遠見番所) (National)
- Sakishima Beacons: Karimata Lookout Office (先島諸島火番盛 狩俣遠見番所) (National)
- Sakishima Beacons: Kurima Lookout Office (先島諸島火番盛 来間遠見番所) (National)
- Sakishima Beacons: Shimajiri Lookout Office (先島諸島火番盛 島尻遠見番所) (National)
- Sakishima Beacons: Uruka Lookout Office (先島諸島火番盛 砂川遠見番所) (National)
- Shimajiri Mutuzuma former settlement and Nnaka-gā spring (島尻元島とンナカガー) (Municipal)
- Shimoji Island Giant Rock (Opi-iwa) (下地島巨岩 (帯岩)) (Municipal)
- Shimoji Niiya Risha's tomb stele (下地仁屋利社の墓碑) (Municipal)
- Stone walls of Shōun-ji Temple (祥雲寺の石垣) (Municipal)
- Sumiya Site (住屋遺跡) (Municipal)
- Sumuryā myāka tomb (スムリャーミャーカ) (Prefectural)
- Susabi myāka tomb (スサビミャーカ) (Municipal)
- Takausu Castle Site (高腰城跡) (Prefectural)
- Tauwainmii-abu Cave (タウワインミイアブ) (Municipal)
- Temaka Castle Site (テマカ城跡) (Municipal)
- Tiizu-abu Cave (ティーズアブ) (Municipal)
- Uipyāyama Site (上比屋山遺跡) (Prefectural)
- Upukā Spring (大川 (ウプカー)) (Municipal)
- Uputaki Castle Site (大嶽城跡) (Municipal)
- Uuni-no-shū Utaki Sacred Site (御船の親お嶽) (Municipal)
- Usubari-abu Cave (ウスバリアブ) (Municipal)
- Well of Minuzuma Site (ミヌズマ遺跡の井戸) (Municipal)
- Yamatobū Large Rock (ヤマトブー大岩) (Municipal)
- Yamato-gā Spring (大和井) (National)
- Yonahashi Stone Tomb (dolmen) (与那覇支石墓) (Municipal)
- Yūkui Sacred Site in Sawada (佐和田のユークイ) (Municipal)
- Yusuma-no-shū's tomb (Lord of the Four Islands's tomb) (四島の主の墓) (Municipal)

=== Places of scenic beauty ===
- Cape Higashi-henna (東平安名崎) (National)
- Former Nakasone Family Gardens (旧仲宗根氏庭園) (National)
- Sawada beach coral reef and lagoon (佐和田の浜珊瑚礁・礁湖面) (Municipal)
- Shiratorisaki reef coastal area (白鳥崎岩礁海岸一帯) (Municipal)
- South and west reef coast of Shimoji Island (下地島南、西岩礁海岸一帯) (Municipal)
- Tōri-ike ponds on Shimoji Island (下地島の通り池) (National)
- Yabiji (八重干瀬) (National)

=== Natural Monuments ===
- Bora limestone terraces in Miyako Island (宮古島保良の石灰華段丘) (National)
- Cape Higashi-henna wind-beaten raised coral coast plant community (東平安名岬の隆起珊瑚礁海岸風衝植物群落) (Prefectural)
- Deigo trees of the Amagoe-za Sacred Square (雨乞座のデイゴ) (Municipal)
- Karimata plant community (狩俣の植物群落) (Municipal)
- Kōjin Migagama Utaki plant community (好善ミガガマ御嶽植物群落) (Municipal)
- Kuninaka Utaki plant community (国仲御嶽の植物群落) (Prefectural)
- Kurima Island cliff vegetation (来間島断崖の植生) (Municipal)
- Maeyama Utaki plant community (前山御嶽の植物群落) (Municipal)
- Nakahara fossils (仲原化石) (Municipal)
- Plant community around Mae-gā spring and its sacred trees (前井と御神木その周辺の植物群落) (Municipal)
- Sea fig hugging an old tomb (古墓を抱くアコウ) (Municipal)
- Shimajiri fault escarpments and marine erosion platforms (島尻断層崖と海食台) (Municipal)
- Shimajiri mangrove forest (島尻のマングローブ林) (Municipal)
- Shimajiri whale fossils (シマジリクジラ化石) (Municipal)
- Solanum miyakojimense (flower) (イラブナスビ) (Municipal)
- Tobitori Utaki plant community (飛鳥御嶽の植物群落) (Municipal)
- Tomai Utaki plant community (トマイ御嶽の植物群落) (Municipal)
- Tōri-ike ponds on Shimoji Island (下地島の通り池) (National)
- Tsuzupisuki-abu Cave (ツヅピスキアブ) (Municipal)
- Ubutakinaka Cave (大竹中洞穴) (Municipal)
- Uputaki Park plant community (大嶽公園の植物群落) (Municipal)
- Yabiji (八重干瀬) (National)

== Gallery ==
Images of places in Miyako-jima
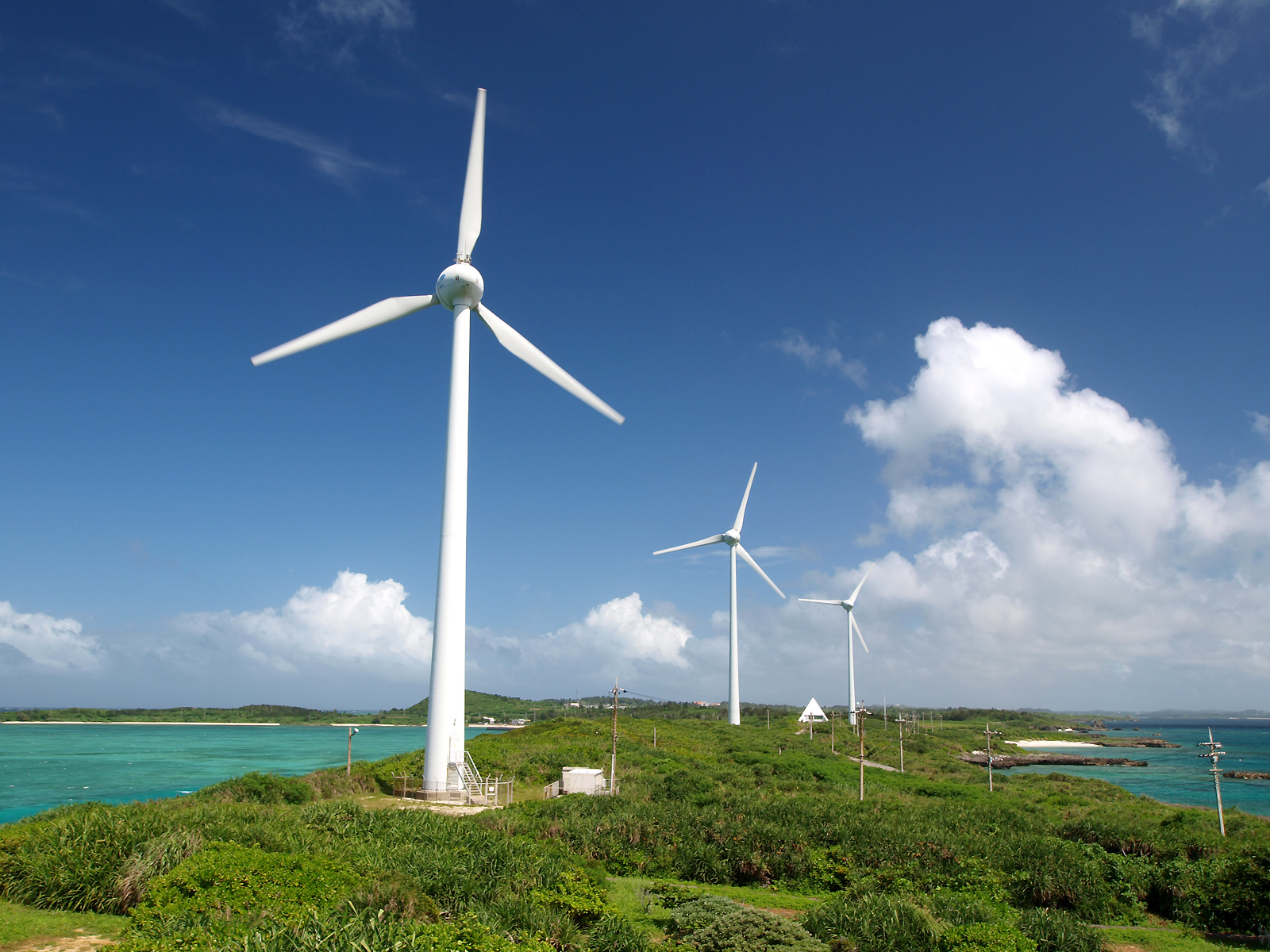
Nishi-Heian Cape

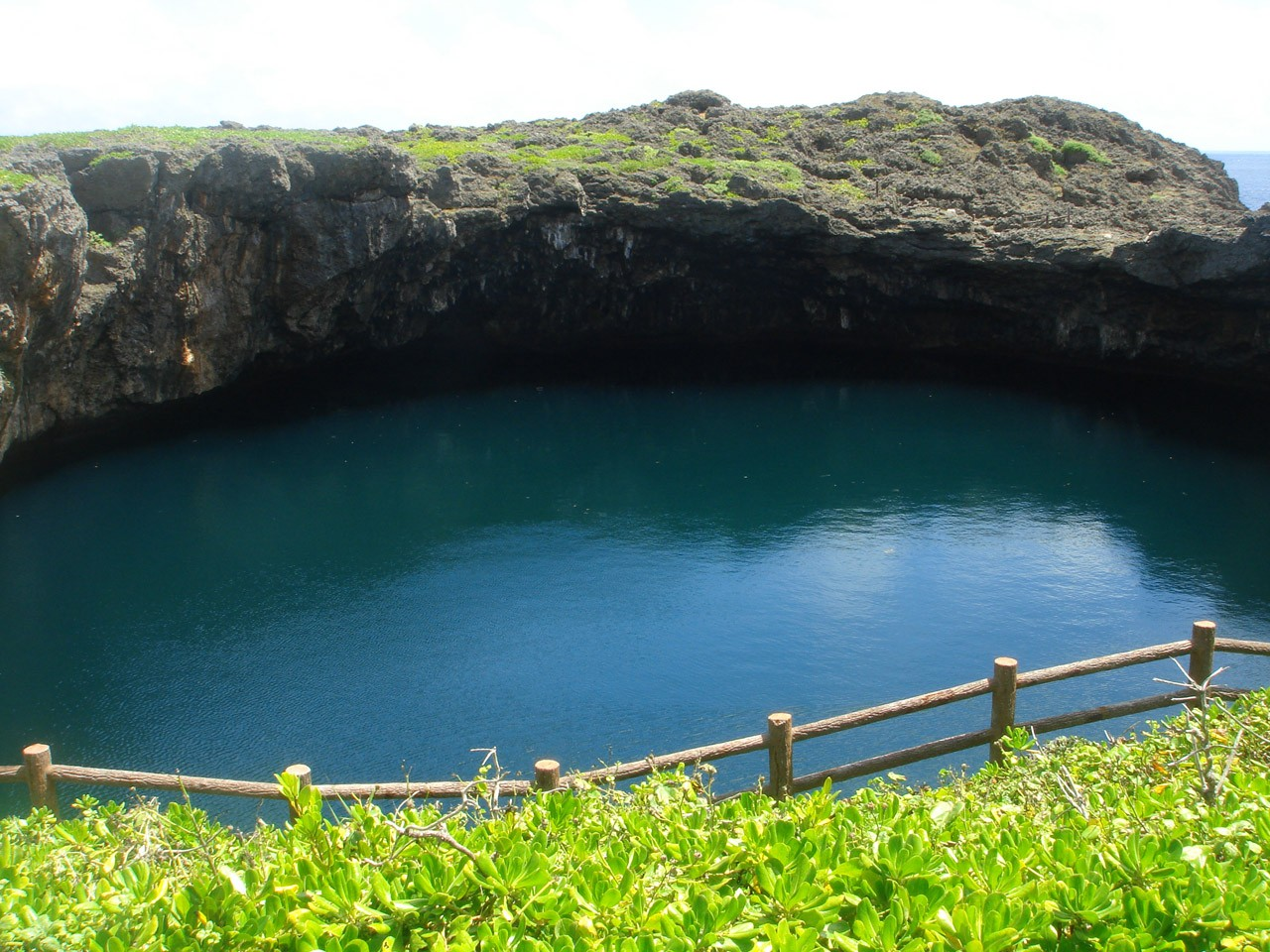
Toriike Pond

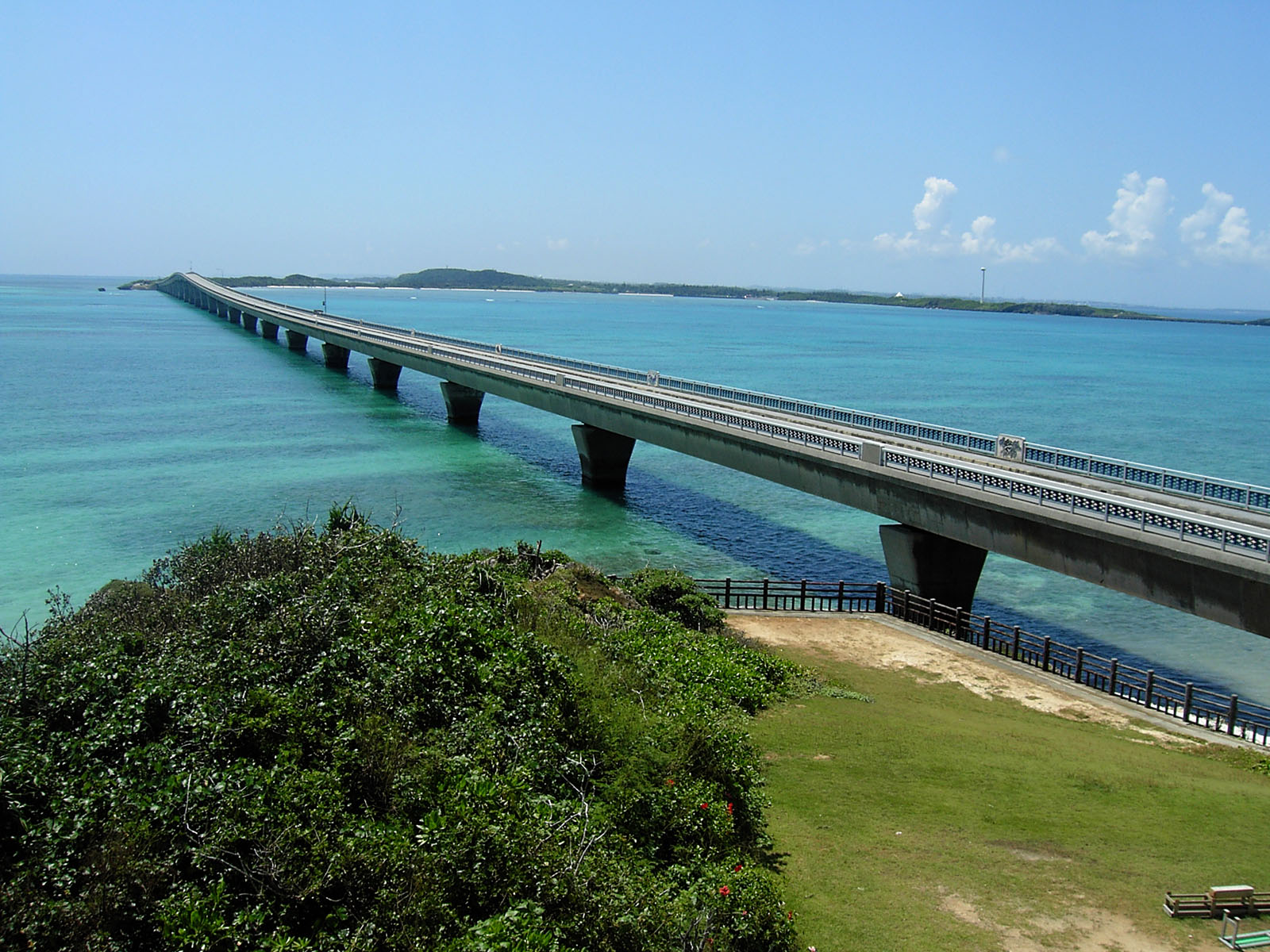
Ikema Bridge

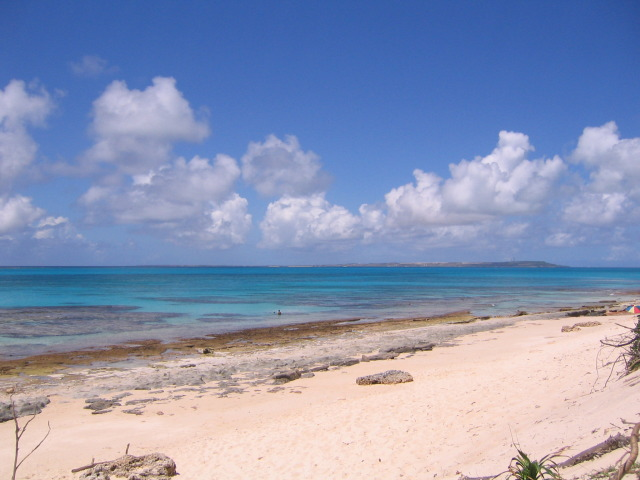
Nagamahama Beach

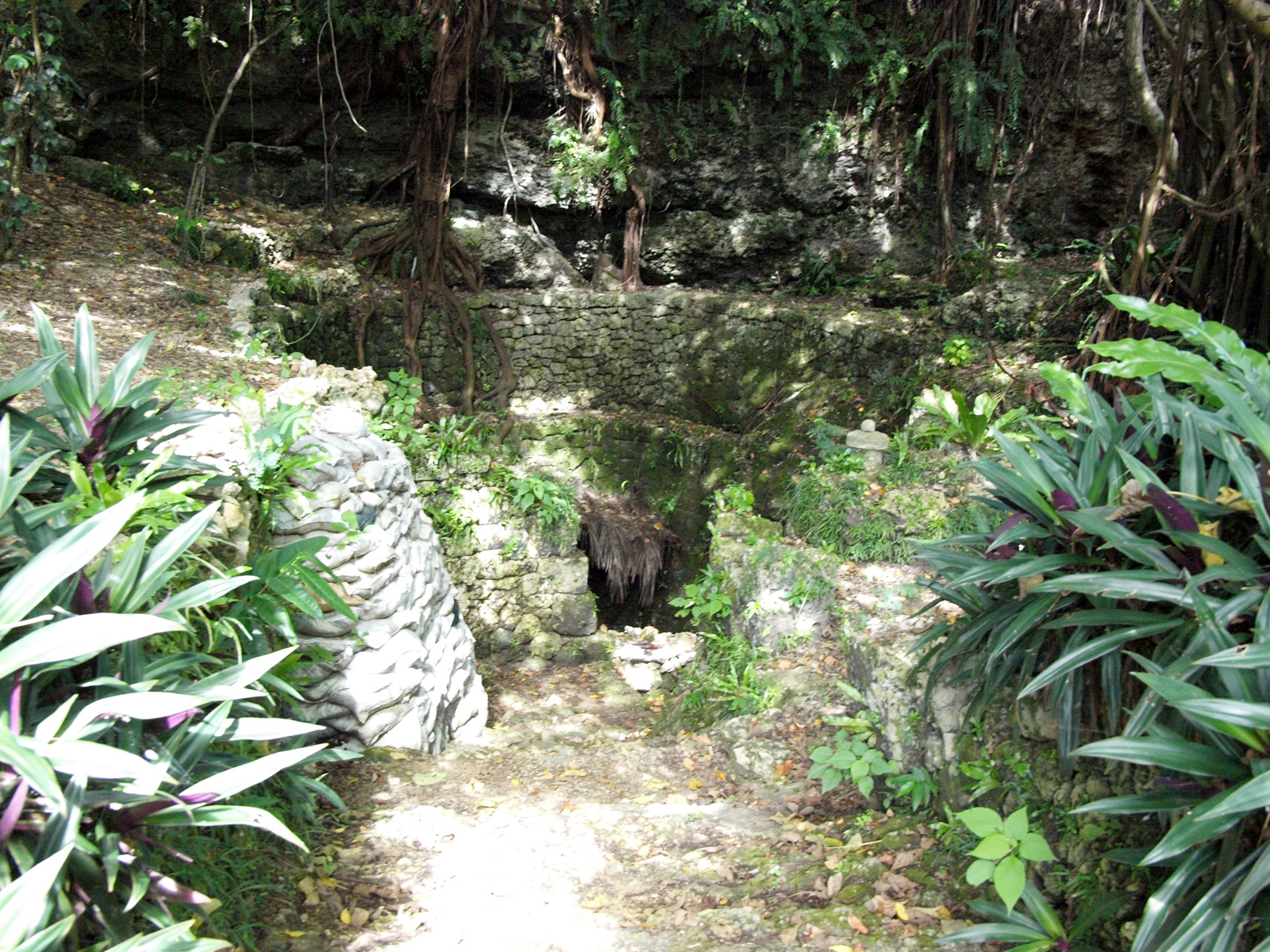
Yamatoi

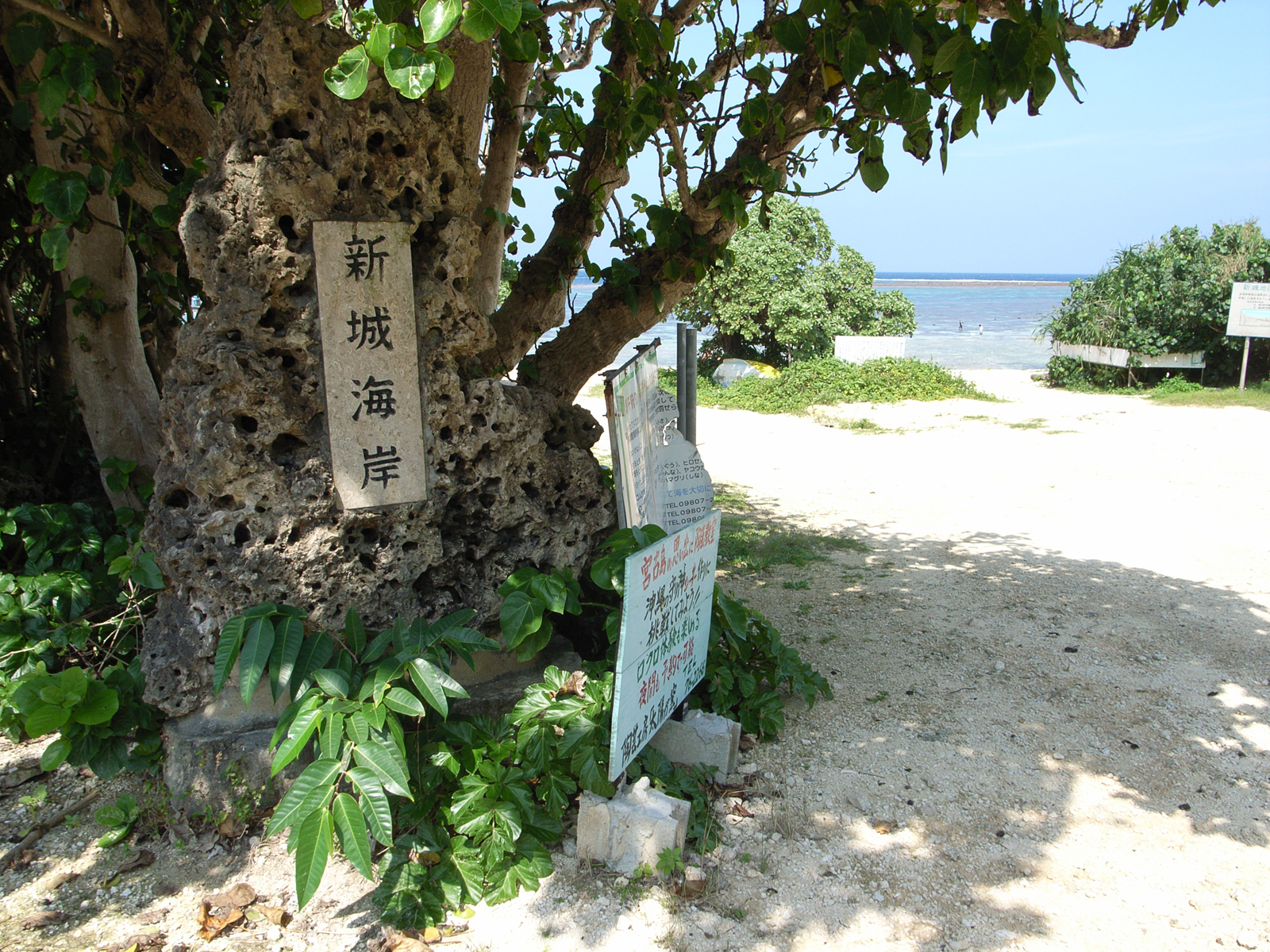
Aragusuku Beach
