= Gusukube, Okinawa =

Dissolved municipality in Okinawa prefecture, Japan

Gusukube (城辺町, Gusukube-chō; Miyako: Gusїkubi) was a town located in Miyako District, Okinawa Prefecture, Japan.

As of 2003, the town had an estimated population of 7,042, a population density of 122.26 persons per km^{2}, and a total area of 57.60 km^{2}.

On October 1, 2005, Gusukube, along with the city of Hirara, and the towns of Irabu and Shimoji, and the village of Ueno (all from Miyako District), was merged to create the city of Miyakojima.
