= Ueno, Okinawa =

Dissolved municipality in Okinawa prefecture, Japan

Ueno (上野村, Ueno-son; Miyako: Uinu) was a village located in Miyako District, Okinawa, Japan. It was home to the Ueno German Culture Village.

As of 2003, the village has an estimated population of 3,236 and a density of 170.5 persons per km^{2}. The total area was 18.98 km^{2}.

On October 1, 2005, Ueno, along with the city of Hirara, and the towns of Gusukube, Irabu and Shimoji (all from Miyako District), was merged to create the city of Miyakojima.
