= Hirara, Okinawa =

Dissolved municipality in Okinawa prefecture, Japan

Hirara (平良市, Hirara-shi), (Miyako: Pїsara) was a city located in Okinawa Prefecture, Japan on the island of Miyako. As of 2003, the city had an estimated population of 33,861 and a density of 521.58 persons per km^{2}. The total area was 64.92 km^{2}.

== History ==
Hirara was founded on March 7, 1947.

On October 1, 2005, Hirara, along with the towns of Gusukube, Irabu and Shimoji, and the village of Ueno (all from Miyako District), was merged to create the city of Miyakojima. This merger was one of a large number of mergers that was conducted in 2005, which was nicknamed "the great Heisei mergers".

The merger was conducted by the "Miyako District Municipal Merger Council", which was responsible for planning mergers in Miyako District. Before the merger, the district consisted of all of the Miyako Islands, but now (after the merger) it only consists of Tarama Village.

== Points of interest ==
- Miyakojima City Tropical Plant Garden
