= Miyako District, Okinawa =

District in Okinawa prefecture, Japan

Coordinates: 24°39′14″N 124°41′42″E

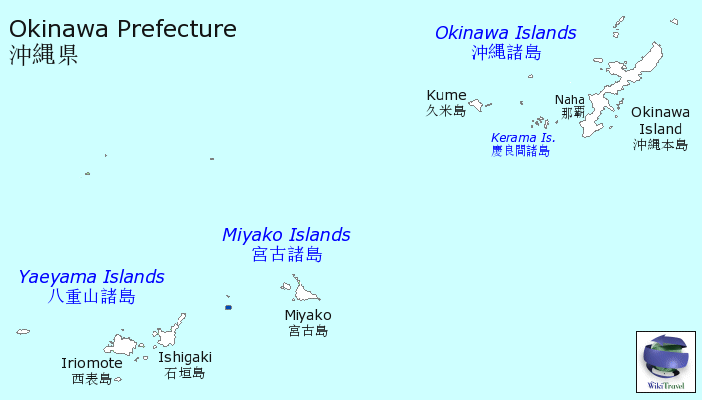
Miyako District (in blue) in Okinawa Prefecture

Miyako (宮古郡, Miyako-gun; Miyako: Myaaku, Tarama dialect: Meeku, Okinawan: Naaku) is a district located in Okinawa Prefecture, Japan, that consists of a single village, Tarama.

== Towns and villages ==
- Tarama

== History ==
Miyako District was formally established in 1896, and spanned all of the Miyako Islands, which are located approximately 300 kilometres (190 mi) west of the prefectural capital of Naha. Miyako Island served as the administrative center of the district. In the administrative reforms of 1908 the former magiri administrative system was abolished, and Miyako District was divided into four villages: Hirara, Shimoji, Gusukube, and Irabu. In 1913 the localities of Nakasuji, Shiokawa, and Minna were separated from Hirara Village to form a fifth village, Tarama. Hirara was elevated to town status in 1924.

The number of municipalities that formed the Miyako District greatly declined after World War II. Hirara was elevated to city status in 1947, leaving the district with fewer villages. A new village, Ueno, was formed in 1948. On October 1, 2005, Hirara, the towns of Irabu and Gusukube, and the village of Ueno merged to form the city of Miyakojima. At present the district consists of a single village, Tarama.

== Transportation ==
Tarama Airport in Tarama serves the Miyako District.

== See also ==
- Miyako Islands
- Miyako Strait
- Miyako-jima
