= List of Central Washington University people =

This page lists notable students, alumni, and faculty members of Central Washington University.

== Sports ==
=== Football ===
- Adam Bighill — CFL Linebacker of the BC Lions
- Keith Gilbertson — NCAA football coach formerly of the University of Idaho, University of California, Berkeley, University of Washington. Played football for the Wildcats for one season in 1967, later graduating in 1971
- Jon Kitna — NFL quarterback of the Seattle Seahawks, Cincinnati Bengals, Detroit Lions, and Dallas Cowboys. Led the team to an NAIA Div. II championship in 1995
- Greg Olson — NFL offensive coach, as of February 2022 for the Los Angeles Rams
- Mike Reilly — CFL quarterback of the Edmonton Eskimos, Formerly of the Pittsburgh Steelers, Green Bay Packers, St. Louis Rams, Seattle Seahawks

=== Baseball ===
- MLB pitcher Dave Heaverlo — San Francisco Giants, Oakland Athletics, Seattle Mariners
- MLB outfielder Billy North — Chicago Cubs, Oakland Athletics, Los Angeles Dodgers, San Francisco Giants

=== Basketball ===
- Joe Callero — Head men's basketball coach at California Polytechnic State University and former head coach of Seattle University

=== Martial Arts ===
- Miesha "Cupcake" Tate — former Strikeforce Women's Bantamweight Champion, former Ultimate Fighting Championship Bantamweight Champion
- Bryan Caraway — UFC bantamweight fighter, ex-boyfriend of Miesha Tate
- Matt Hume (business) — retired mixed martial artist; founder and head trainer at AMC Pankration in Seattle, V.P. of Operations at ONE Championship
- Anthony Hamilton — professional MMA fighter in the UFC's Heavyweight Division'

== Government or military - United States ==
- Ann Anderson (politician) — member of the Washington State Senate
- Bryan Christopher Black — US Army Special Forces soldier killed in action during the Tongo Tongo ambush in Niger on October 4, 2017.
- Brigadier General John R. Croft — Chief of Staff of the Wisconsin Air National Guard
- Duane Davidson — Washington State Treasurer
- Brigadier General Myron N. Dobashi — Commander of the Hawaii Air National Guard
- Deb Manjarrez — Member of the Washington House of Representatives
- General James N. Mattis — United States Marine Corps. Class of 1972. Commander of the United States Central Command 2010–2013. Secretary of Defense under President Donald Trump.
- Dorothy M. Metcalf-Lindenburger — astronaut assigned to the crew of STS-131, her first expedition.
- Douglas Albert Munro — only member of the United States Coast Guard to have received the Medal of Honor, the U.S. military's highest decoration. (October 11, 1919 – September 27, 1942)
- Craig Olson, Lieutenant Commander, Navy Blue Angels — Demonstration #5 Lead Solo Pilot. A Boeing F/A-18E/F Super Hornet instructor pilot at Naval Air Station Lemoore. Decorations include: Navy and Marine Corps Commendation Medal, three Navy and Marine Corps Achievement Medals, and various personal and unit awards.
- Ron Sims — Former Deputy Secretary of the United States Department of Housing and Urban Development (under President Barack Obama) and former King County Executive.
- Doug Sutherland — former Washington State Commissioner of Public Lands

== Other Government or Military ==
- Mohammad Mahmood Abubakar - Nigerian biologist and former Agriculture and Environment Minister of the Federal Government of Nigeria.
- Chobin Zukeran - former mayor of Nanjō, Okinawa and a former member of the House of Representatives of Japan, representing Okinawa 4th district (southern Okinawa Island and the Sakishima Islands). He is an outspoken proponent of the removal of American bases from Okinawa.

== Business ==
- Christine M. Day — CEO of athletic sportswear company Lululemon Athletica
- Stephen L. Nelson — author of "Quicken for Dummies" and 150 other books in the series, over 5 million copies sold worldwide. Named "most prolific computer book writer" by Wall Street Journal
- Shelley Powers — computer book author and technology architect
- Raymond Conner — former vice chairman of The Boeing Company and president and CEO of Boeing Commercial Airplanes

== Arts and Entertainment ==
- David L Boushey — American stuntman and the founder of the United Stuntmen's Association, the International Stunt School, the Society of American Fight Directors, and is a member of The Hollywood Stuntmen's Hall Of Fame.
- Craig T. Nelson — star of sitcom Coach and actor in the film Poltergeist
- Brian Thompson — known for his work in action films and television series
- Wanz — featured singer on Macklemore and Ryan Lewis hit song "Thrift Shop"

== Other ==
- Dr. David Boyd — trauma surgeon, and developer of Regional Trauma Emergency Medical Services (EMS).
- Mary Jo Estep (1910-1992) — teacher, sole survivor of the Battle of Kelley Creek
- Sadistik (Cody Foster) — Hip Hop Artist
- W. Hudson Kensel — historian of the American West.
- Quigg Lawrence — Anglican bishop
- Daniel D. McCracken — prominent computer scientist. He was a Professor of Computer Sciences at the City College of New York, and the author of over two dozen textbooks on computer programming.
- Susan Elaine Rancourt — American murder victim. Rancourt's name was given to university's Barto Hall residence hall.
- David L. Soltz — Provost of the university, 2001-2007
- Allan Byron Swift — Emmy Award-winning broadcaster, served as a member of the United States House of Representatives from 1979 to 1995. He represented the Second Congressional District of Washington as a Democrat.
