= Sakishima Islands =

Archipelago within the Ryukyu Islands

Native name:
- 先島諸島 (Sakishima-shotō)/
  先島群島(Sakishima-guntō) (Japanese)
- (in other languages)
  Miyako	Saksїzїma
  Yaeyama	Sakїzїma
  Okinawan	Sachishima
  Yonaguni	Satichima
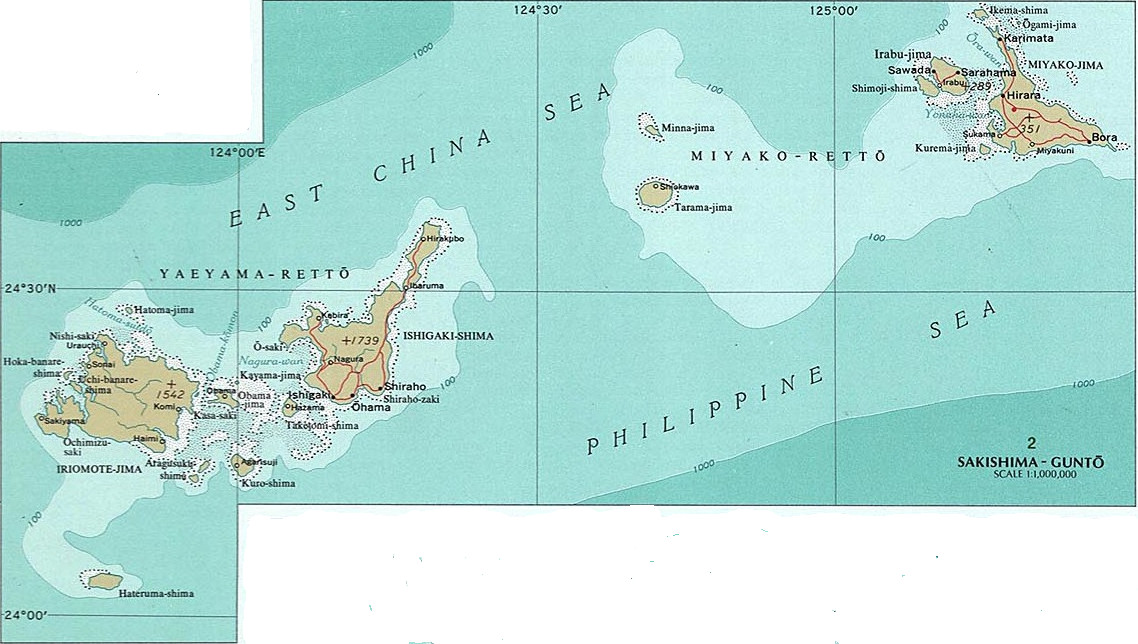
- Map of the Sakishima Islands (Yonaguni Island not shown)

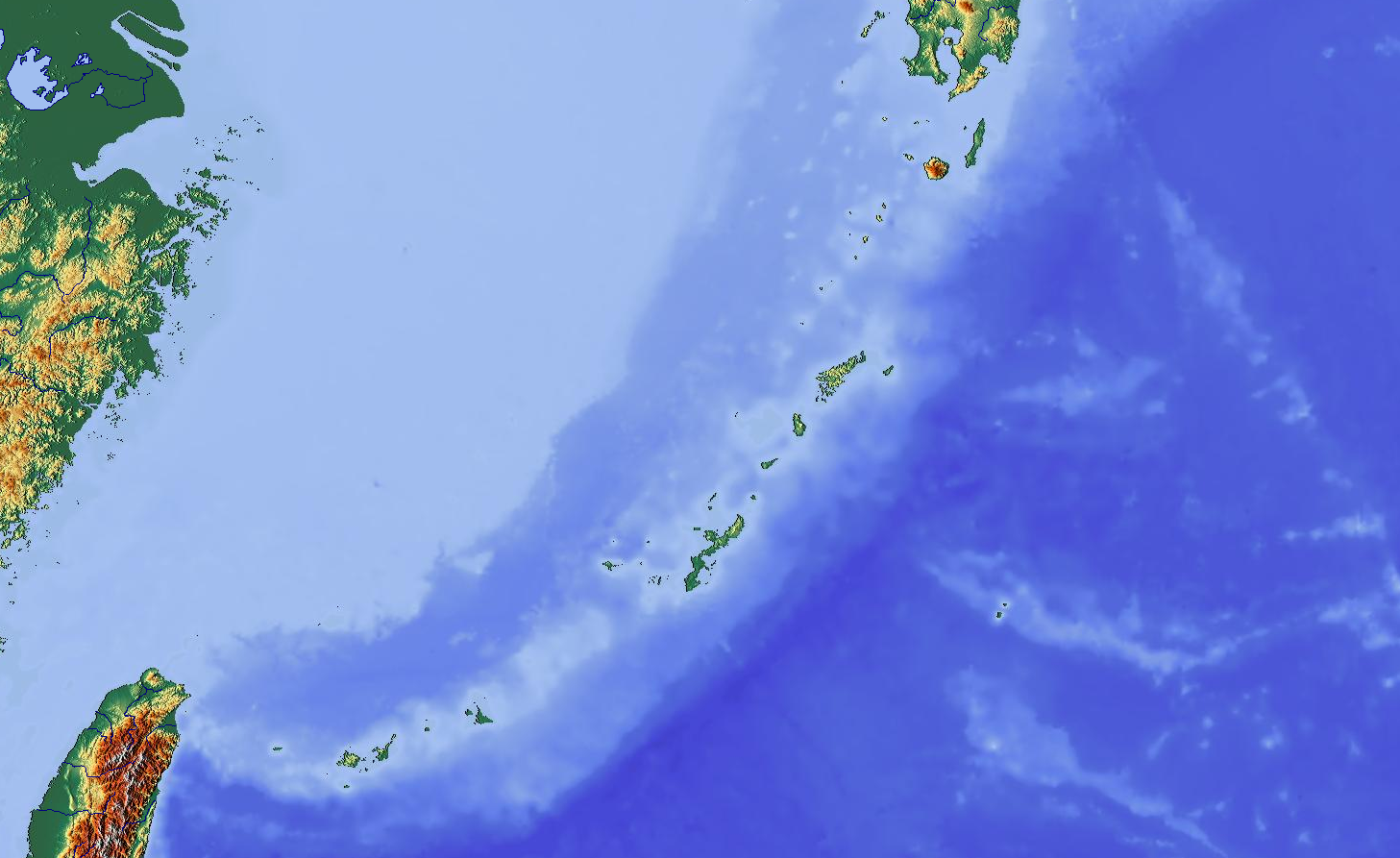
- Location within Ryukyu Islands

Geography
- Location: Between the southern border of the East China Sea and northwestern border of the Philippine Sea
- Coordinates: 24.709652°N 124.388477°E
- Archipelago: Japanese archipelago
- Total islands: 44 (20 inhabited)
- Major islands: Iriomote; Ishigaki; Miyako
- Area: 818.45 km^{2} (316.01 sq mi)
- Highest elevation: 526.0 m (1725.7 ft)
- Highest point: Mount Omoto

Administration
- Japan
- Prefecture: Okinawa
- Municipalities: Miyakojima; Ishigaki; Miyako District (Tarama); Yaeyama District (Taketomi, Yonaguni)
- Largest city: Miyakojima (pop. 54,931 (2020))

Demographics
- Population: 107,244 (October 1, 2020)
- Pop. density: 131.0/km^{2} (339.3/sq mi)
- Languages: Japanese
- Ethnic groups: Japanese, Ryukyuan

Additional information
- Time zone: JST (UTC+9)
  - Summer (DST): not observed (UTC+9)

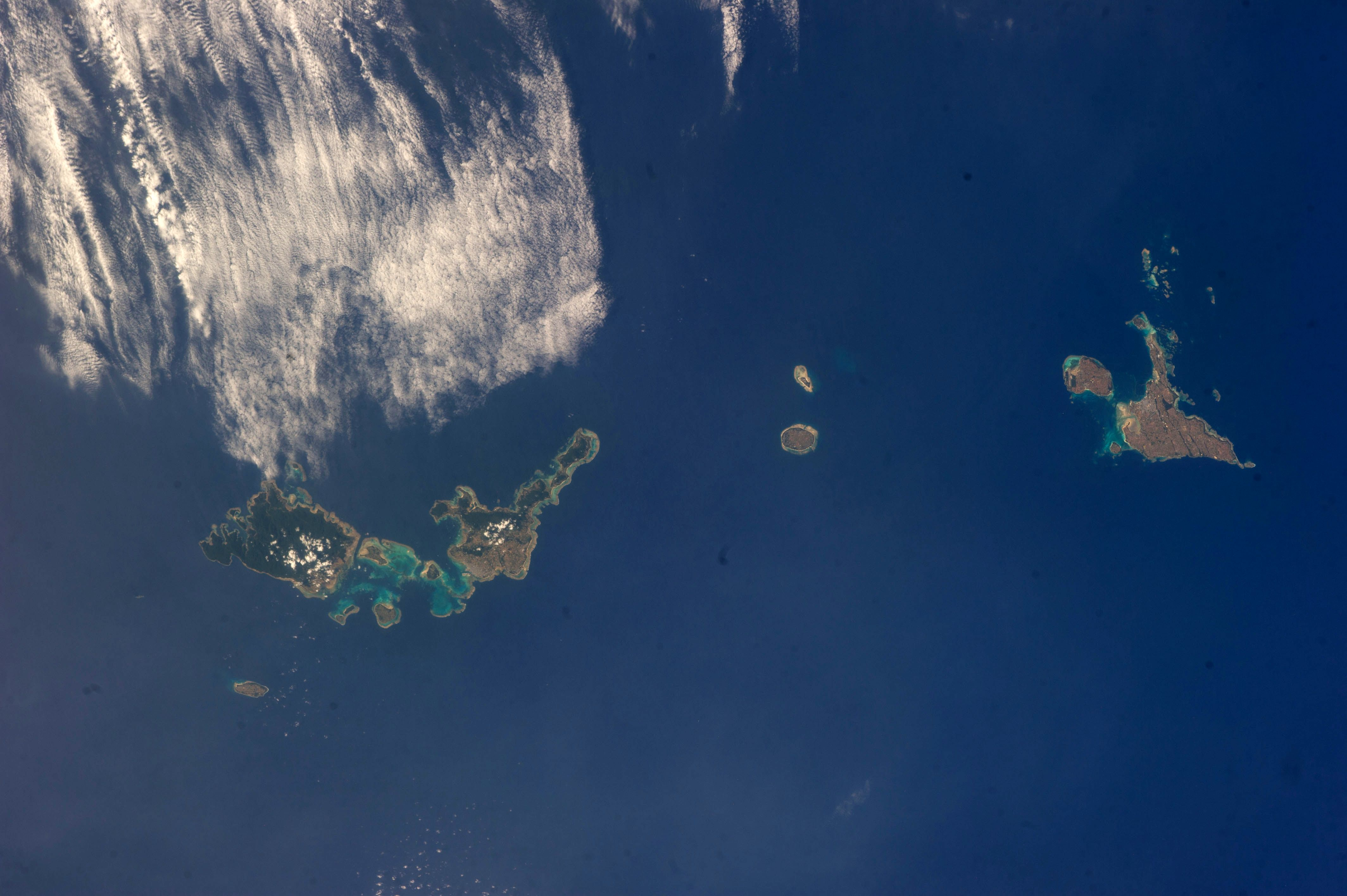
View of the Sakishima Islands from the ISS

The Sakishima Islands (Japanese: 先島諸島 / 先島群島, Hepburn: Sakishima-shotō / Sakishima-guntō; Okinawan: Sachishima; Miyako: Saksїzїma; Yaeyama: Sakїzїma; Yonaguni: Satichima) are an archipelago located at the southernmost end of the Japanese archipelago. They are part of the Ryukyu Islands and include the Miyako Islands and the Yaeyama Islands. The islands are administered as part of Okinawa Prefecture, Japan.

== Inhabited islands ==
Sakishima Islands

- Miyako Islands (former Miyako Subprefecture)
  - Miyakojima City
    - Ikema Island (Ikema-jima)
    - Irabu Island (Irabu-jima)
    - Kurima Island (Kurima-jima)
    - Miyako Island (Miyako-jima)
    - Ōgami Island (Ōgami-jima)
    - Shimoji Island (Shimoji-shima)
  - Tarama Village
    - Tarama Island (Tarama-jima)
    - Minna Island (Minna-jima)
- Yaeyama Islands (former Yaeyama Subprefecture)
  - Ishigaki City
    - Ishigaki Island (Ishigaki-jima)
  - Taketomi Town
    - Aragusuku Island (Aragusuku-jima)
    - Hateruma Island (Hateruma-jima)
    - Iriomote Island (Iriomote-jima)
    - Kohama Island (Kohama-jima)
    - Kuroshima Island (Kuroshima)
    - Taketomi Island (Taketomi-jima)
    - Yubu Island (Yubu-jima)
  - Yonaguni Town
    - Yonaguni Island (Yonaguni-jima)
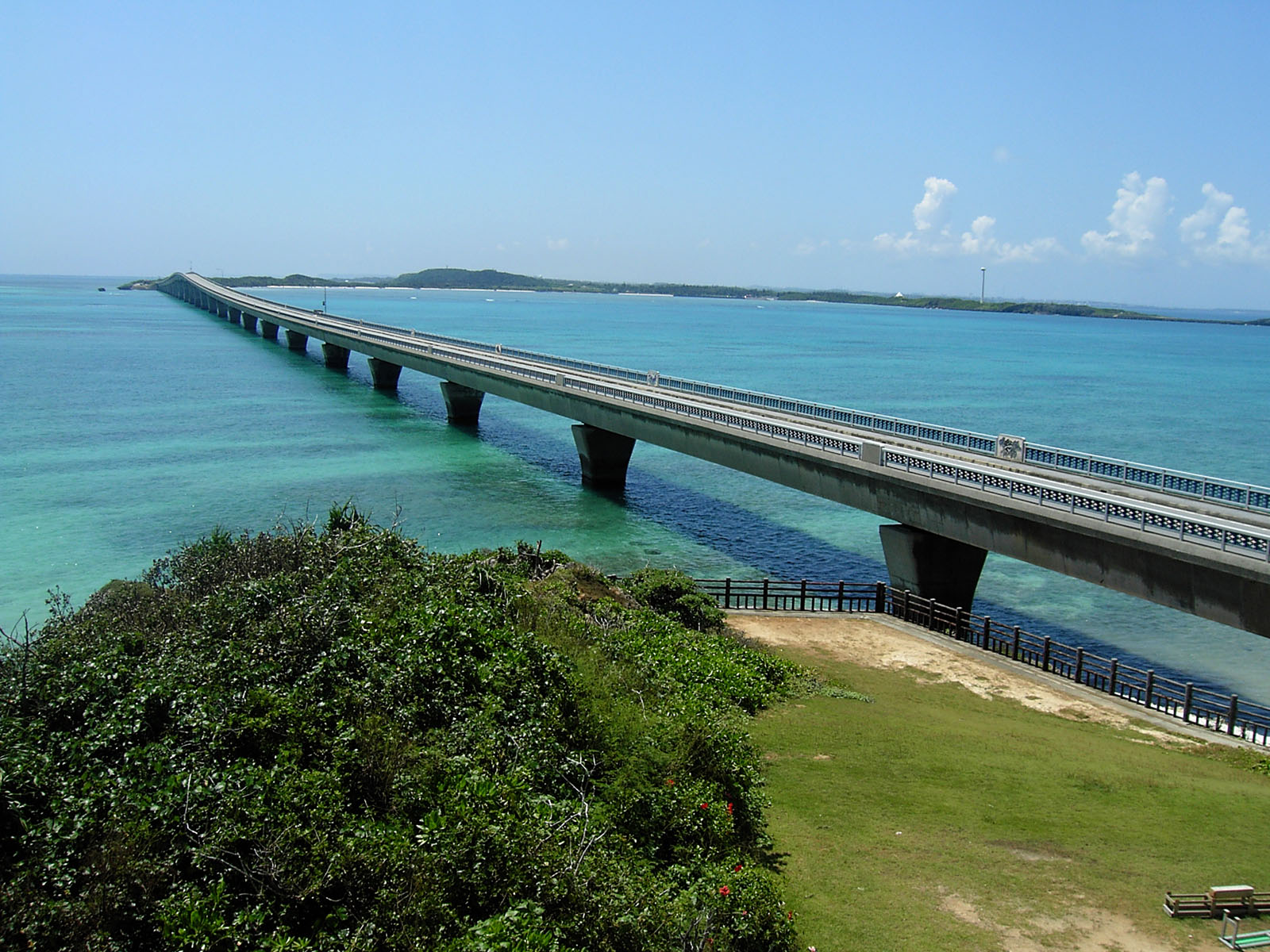
Ikema Bridge, between Miyako and Ikema

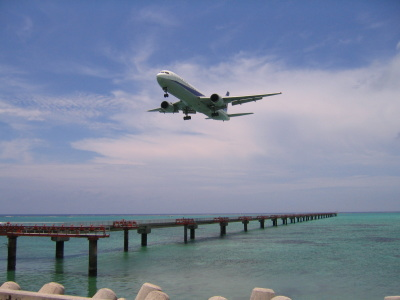
Shimoji

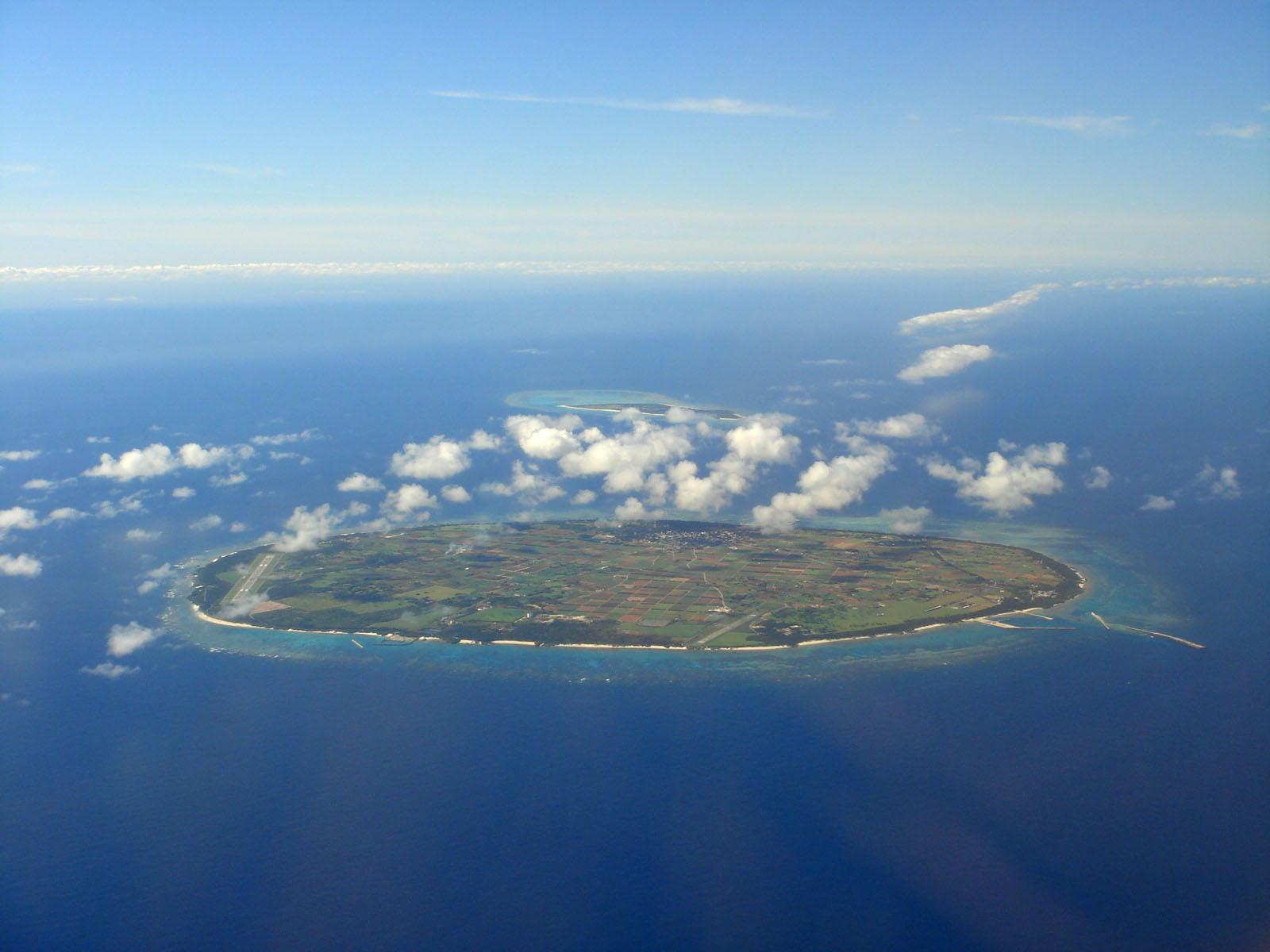
Tarama

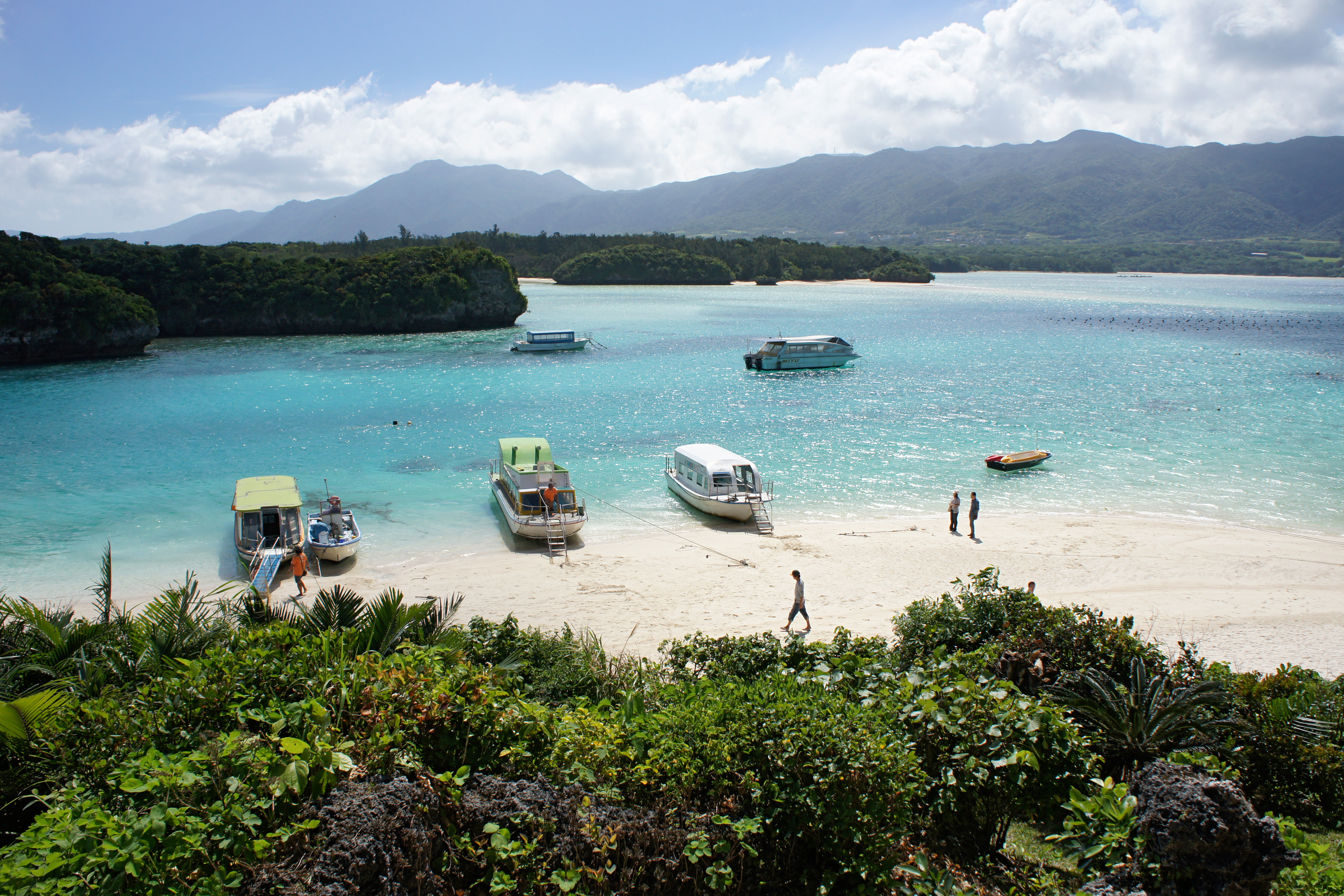
Ishigaki

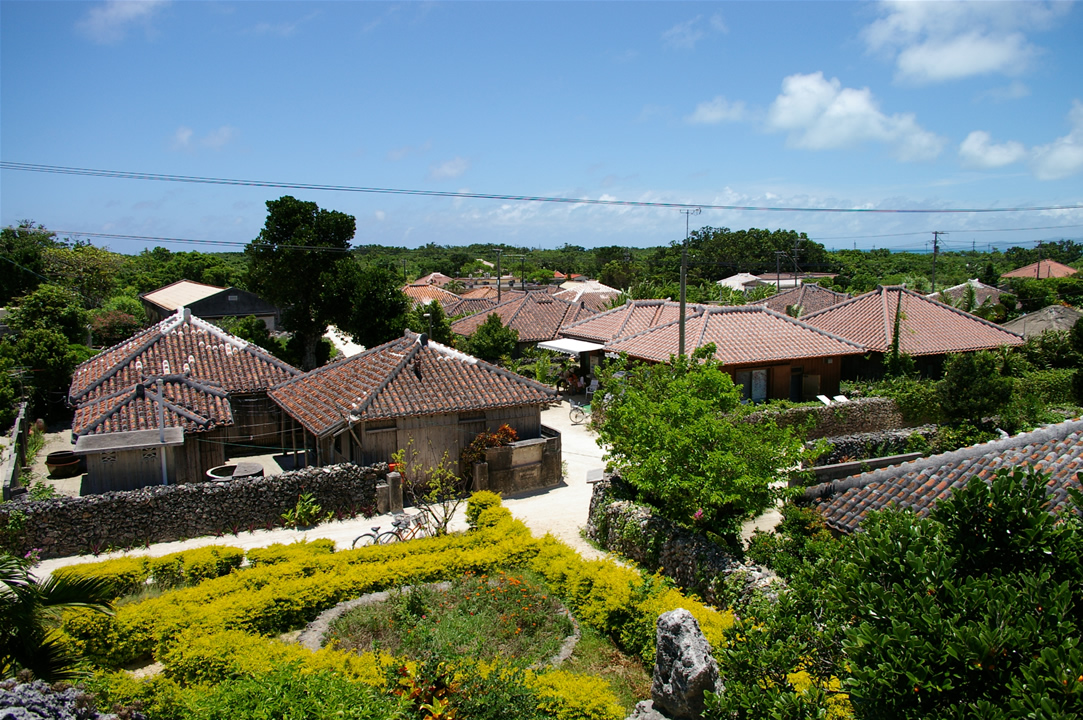
Taketomi

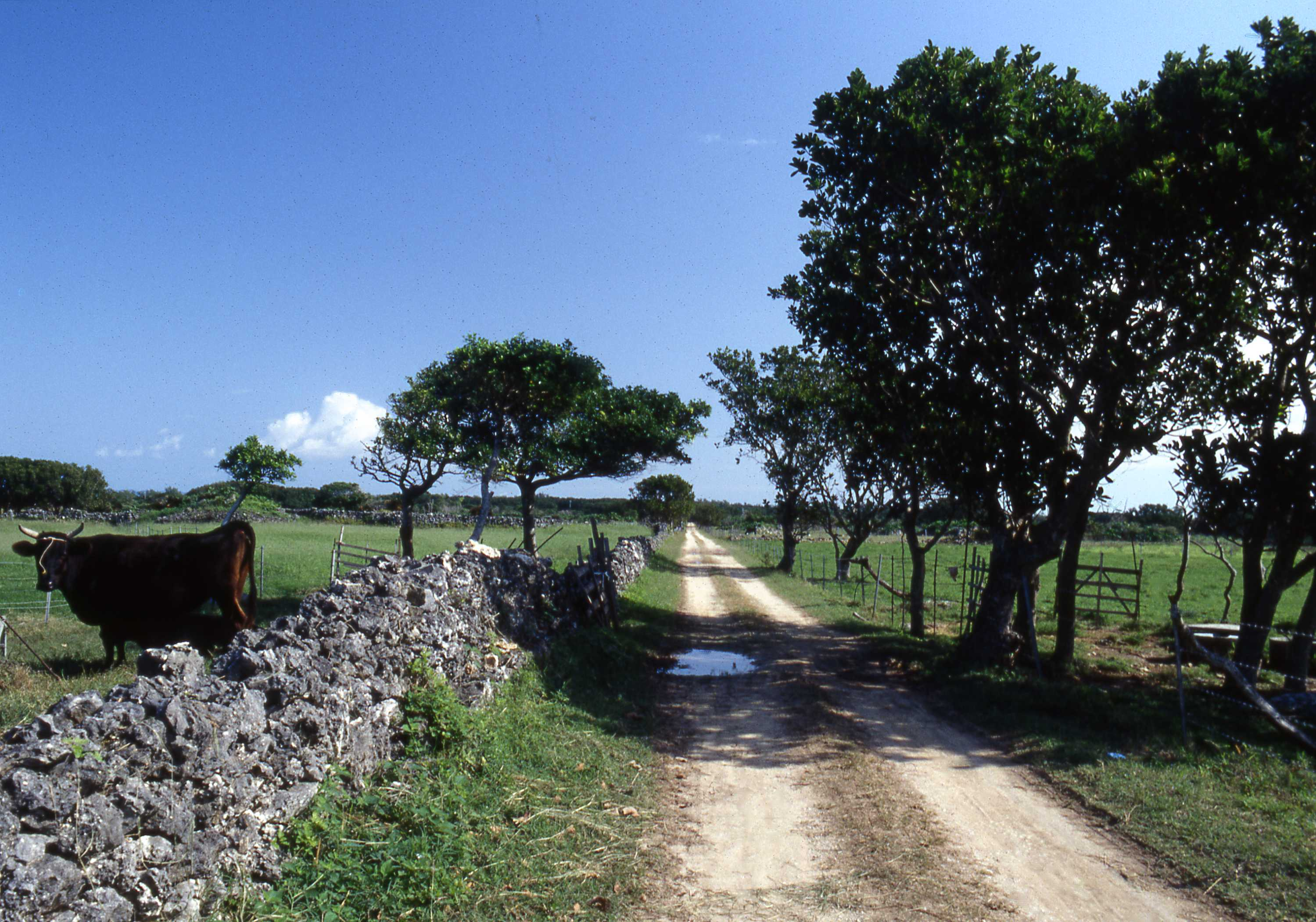
Kuroshima

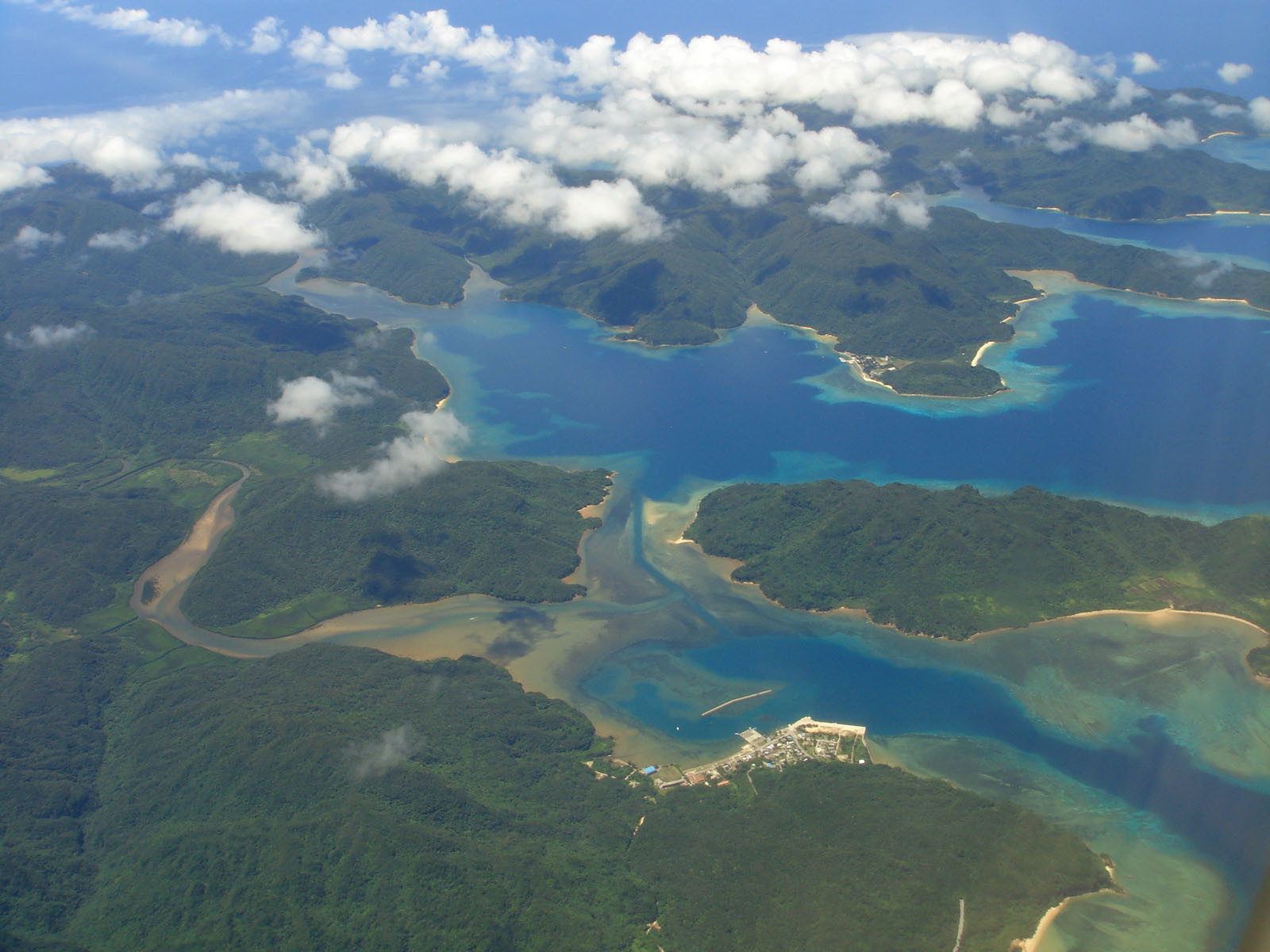
Iriomote

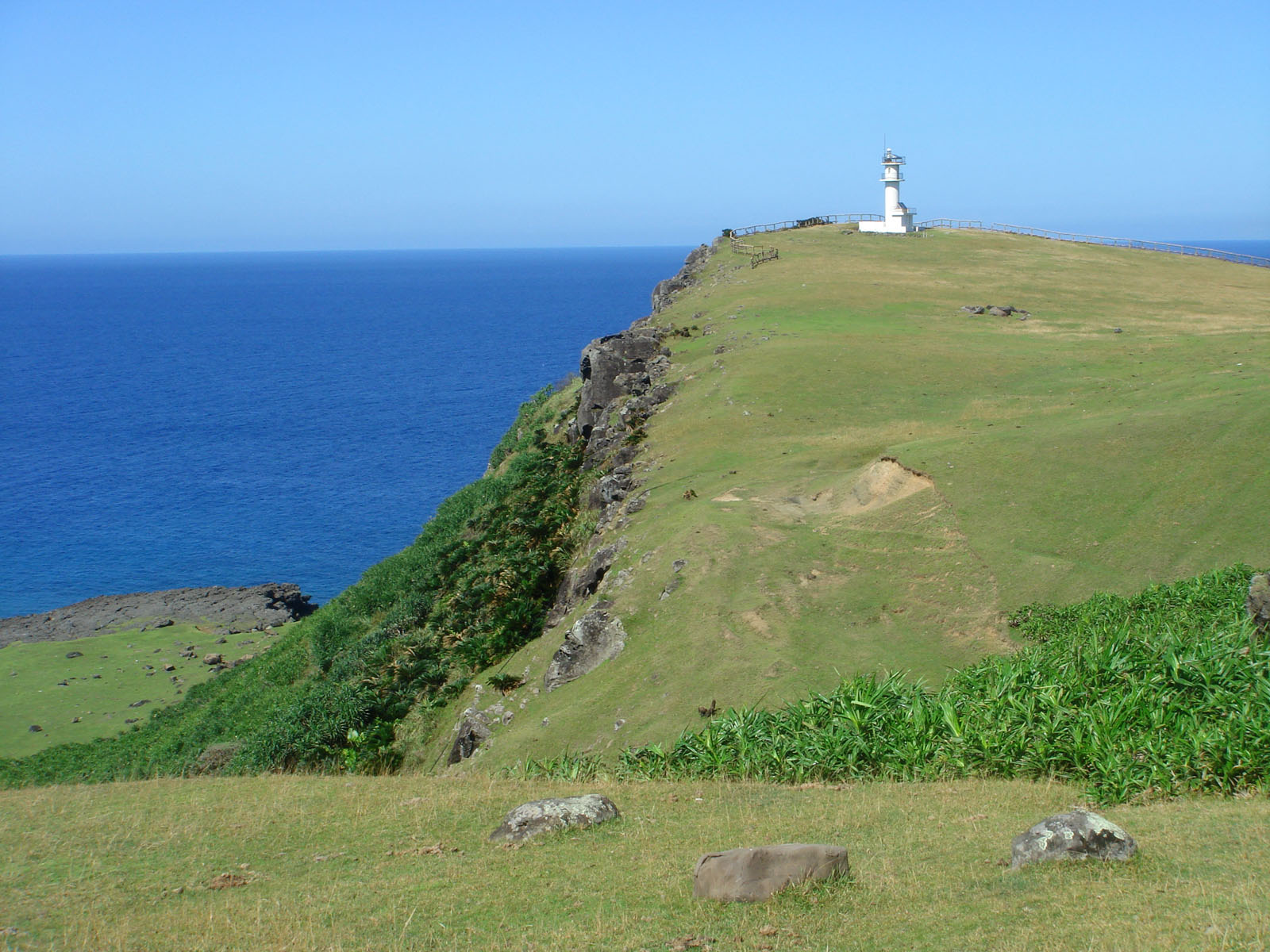
Yonaguni

== History ==
The Sakishima Islands were first documented in the Shoku Nihongi (797), which says that in 714 Ō no Ason Okeji (太朝臣遠建治) paid tribute to Dazaifu with 52 islanders from Amami (奄美), Shigaki (信覚), Kumi (球美) and other islands. Shigaki is believed to be the current Ishigaki (石垣), Kumi to be the current Kume (久米) or Komi (古見) settlement of Iriomote. The History of Yuan (1370) documented a castaway from Mìyágǔ (密牙古) arrived to Wenzhou in 1317. This is believed to be the first documentation of Miyako (宮古).

Stone tools and shell tools from 2,500 years ago have been excavated from shell mounds on the Sakishima Islands. Shell tools of the same era are also found in Taiwan and the Philippines, but not on Okinawa Island or Amami. Thus those islands are thought to have had a stronger or closer cultural relationship with Taiwan, the Philippines, and other regions which are Austronesian-speaking.

Local earthenware was made beginning in the 11th century. Many local leaders, known as aji, appeared in the 15th century. At the same time, the political authorities on Okinawa saw the outlying islands as useful stopping points along a maritime trade route, and gradually enhanced their influence. Yohanashiidu Tuyumya (与那覇勢頭豊見親) unified Miyako in 1365, and paid tribute to Satto, the king of the Chūzan kingdom of Okinawa.

=== Ryukyuan control ===
In 1500, Oyake Akahachi (遠弥計赤蜂 or 於屋計赤蜂), Aji of Ishigaki, unified most of the Yaeyama Islands and rose up in resistance against the Ryukyu Kingdom by refusing to pay further tribute. As he was planning to invade Miyako, Nakasone Tuyumya (仲宗根豊見親), Aji of Miyako, discovered the plan and launched a preemptive invasion of the Yaeyama Islands. Oyake Akahachi was defeated at Furusutobaru Castle, and Nakasone Tuyumya went on to conquer Yonaguni. King Shō Shin of Ryukyu responded to the initial rebellion by sending troops, but they arrived at Miyako after most of the fighting had ended. The Ryukyuan army consisted of 3,000 soldiers and 100 ships; Nakasone Tuyumya chose to surrender instead of fighting, handing over all of the Sakishima Islands to Ryukyu.

The Shimazu clan of the Japanese feudal domain of Satsuma invaded the kingdom during the 1609 Invasion of Ryukyu. Satsuma was able to capture Shuri Castle and King Shō Nei by early May, then sent a message to the Sakishima Islands demanding their surrender, which they complied with. In the following centuries of vassalage to Satsuma, the Ryukyuan government was placed under extreme tax pressure, and instituted a heavy poll tax in the Sakishima Islands. As a result of the extreme economic conditions, infanticide and other methods of population control became common, as they did throughout the Ryukyu Islands; remains of the sites where this took place can still be found throughout the Sakishima Islands. Yaeyama islanders were taxed even more heavily than those of Miyako, as the rebel Oyake Akahachi was from Yaeyama. The kingdom prohibited migration of islanders, isolating them to prevent group resistance. The Yaeyama earthquake in 1771 caused a tsunami which killed 12,000, or a half of the entire Sakishima population. Because the soil was adversely affected by salination, famines were frequent, and the population of the islands further decreased until the early Meiji period.

=== Japanese control ===
After the Meiji Restoration, in 1872, the Japanese government unilaterally declared that the Ryukyu Kingdom was then Ryukyu Domain and began incorporating the islands as a part of Japan. In 1879, after the Ryukyuan government resisted and disobeyed orders from Tokyo, Japan abolished the domain, deposed the king, and established Okinawa Prefecture. The Qing dynasty of China, however, opposed the action, claiming sovereignty over the former kingdom. Japan proposed to cede the Sakishima Islands, provided China add "most favored nation" status of Japan to the Sino-Japanese Treaty of Amity. China agreed at first, but after objections from Viceroy Li Hongzhang, the agreement was not made. China effectively conceded its claims to sovereignty over Ryukyu, including the Sakishima Islands, following its defeat by Japan in the Sino-Japanese War of 1894–95.

The modernization of Sakishima by the Japanese government was slow compared with Japan or even Okinawa. The heavy poll tax continued until as late as 1903. Meanwhile, the islands, as well as Taiwan, used Western Standard Time (UTC+8) until 1937, 1 hour behind the Central Standard Time of Japan (UTC+9).

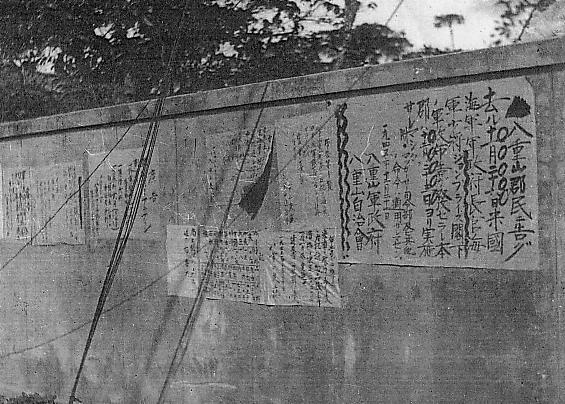
A notice board by the Yaeyama Community Association, December 1945

During World War II, there was an air battle waged against the Sakishima Islands' two largest islands that lasted for 82 days in order to neutralize Kamikaze airfields. Twenty-five US escort carriers, five larger fleet carriers with their air groups consisting of fighters and torpedo bombers along with heavy naval patrol bombers and an assortment of destroyers and destroyer escorts along with the British Pacific Fleet bombed, rocketed and fired their guns at runways and other targets daily while the land battle raged on Okinawa 175 miles away. This was the least publicized battle for its size that took place involving the Americans and British during the war. The thirty-two thousand seasoned Imperial Japanese Army (IJA) and Naval (IJN) troops on Miyako did not surrender until 27 days after Japan formally surrendered. The amount of ordnance expended against the Sakishima Islands may have exceeded the ordnance spent on the island of Iwo Jima. The Sakishima Islands did not suffer a ground invasion during World War II, although a great deal of anti-submarine warfare and convoy battles took place in the waters immediately surrounding the archipelago in the years leading up to the Okinawa campaign. A number of American and Japanese submarines were lost on the approaches to these islands as they formed a vital outlying defense to the Empire's shipping bottlenecks in the Formosa (Taiwan) and Luzon Straits.

In June 1945, the Japanese government ordered locals to evacuate to northern Ishigaki and Iriomote, where 3,647 of them lost their lives to malaria. In contrast, air raids killed much fewer: 174. After the Imperial Japanese Army was defeated on Okinawa later that month, there was a vacuum of military and government control in the Sakishima Islands. Some garrison troops robbed crops from farms or engaged in violence against locals. To counter them, the residents of Ishigaki formed the Yaeyama Community Association (八重山自治会). Since it acted as a temporary local government, some historians later described the association as the Yaeyama Republic (八重山共和国).

=== American control ===
United States Occupation authorities declared the establishment of military rule in December 1945, restoring Miyako Subprefecture and Yaeyama Subprefecture. The local association ceased operation. In 1952, the Treaty of San Francisco confirmed these islands to be under American control. Malaria was eradicated from the island in 1961. The islands were returned to Japan in 1972, along with the rest of Okinawa Prefecture.

=== Today ===
Today the Sakishima Islands enjoy a thriving tourist industry. As part of the Sakishima Islands are the Senkaku Islands, which fall under Okinawa Prefecture and Ishigaki City politically. The Japanese Self Defense Force and Japan Coast Guard maintain a large presence in the Sakishima Islands.

== Culture ==
There are three native languages on the islands; Miyako language on the Miyako Islands, Yonaguni language on Yonaguni, and Yaeyama language on the other Yaeyama Islands. All these languages belong to the Southern Ryukyuan branch of the Ryukyuan languages group, which in turn belong to the Japonic languages group. These languages are not mutually intelligible. As on Okinawa, therefore, standard Japanese language is used in formal situations, while Okinawan Japanese, that is, standard Japanese with native Ryukyuan words, pronunciation changes, etc. mixed in, is quite commonly used as well.

== See also ==
- 1771 Great Yaeyama Tsunami
