= Government of the Ryukyu Islands =

Self-government of native Okinawans, 1952–1972

The Government of the Ryukyu Islands (琉球政府, Ryūkyū Seifu) was the self-government of native Okinawans during the American occupation of Okinawa. It was created by proclamation of the United States Civil Administration of the Ryukyu Islands (USCAR) on April 1, 1952, and was abolished on May 14, 1972, when Okinawa was returned to Japan, in accordance with the 1971 Okinawa Reversion Agreement. The government was headed by a Chief Executive (行政主席, Gyōsei Shuseki), and had an elected legislature. It often had conflicts with USCAR, who could overrule all of their decisions. The Ryukyuan government was the driving force behind the movement for Okinawa to return to Japanese administration.

The government consisted of an executive branch, a legislative branch, and a judicial branch; the legislature made its own laws. From 1952 to 1960, the Chief Executive was appointed by USCAR. He was then nominated by the leader of the dominant party of the legislature (1960–66), elected in the legislature (1966–68), and finally elected by the citizens (1968–72).

== Background ==
In 1945, the Okinawa Advisory Council was established by order of the United States Armed Forces, to administer the Okinawa Islands, the prefecture office of which had been eliminated as a result of Battle of Okinawa. The surviving prefecture offices, including those of Miyako Subprefecture and Yaeyama Subprefecture, established their own independent administrations. On February 2, 1946, after the decision to partition Japan's territory south of the 30th parallel north, Ōshima Subprefecture (including the Amami Islands and Tokara Islands) separated from the jurisdiction of Kagoshima Prefecture and came under the command of the United States Military Government of the Ryukyu Islands. On August 4, 1950, after multiple reorganizations, the Government of the Okinawa Islands, Government of the Miyako Islands, Government of the Yaeyama Islands, and Government of the Amami Islands were established.

Originally, these administrative organizations were lower branches of the United States Military Government of the Ryukyu Islands. In 1950, this military government changed its name to the "United States Civil Administration of the Ryukyu Islands." USCAR directed and supervised these subordinate governments, with the power to unconditionally veto their decisions.

Until 1952, the island governments were headed by popularly elected governors and frequently exhibited speech and conduct contrary to the intentions of USCAR, such as demands to return to Japanese administration. In response, USCAR created the Government of the Ryukyu Islands (GRI), headed by Ryukyu residents designated by USCAR itself. This government had its own courts, legislature, and executive, forming the judicial, legislative, and executive branches of government, respectively. However, there was no change in the policy allowing USCAR to annul any government decision, and the government was under USCAR surveillance. Nonetheless, the movement to return to rule by the Japanese mainland was popular to the extent that every legislative session, from the very first, passed a resolution to return to Japanese administration. The Ryukyuan government and legislature were the driving force behind the later movement for Okinawa Prefecture to return to Japanese control, against the wishes of USCAR.

== Members of government ==
=== Chief executives ===
No.	Portrait	Name (Birth–Death)	Took office	Left office	Political party
1		Shūhei Higa (1902–1956) (Note: Provisional to 1 April 1952.)	1 April 1951	25 October 1956	Ryūkyū Democratic Party
2		Jūgō Tōma (1895–1971) (Note: Acting to 1 November 1956.)	25 October 1956	10 November 1959	Independent
3		Seisaku Ōta (1904–1999)	10 November 1959	31 October 1964	Okinawa Liberal Democratic Party
4		Seiho Matsuoka (1897–1989)	31 October 1964	1 December 1968	Okinawa Liberal Democratic Party
5		Chōbyō Yara (1902–1997) (Note: Afterwards served as the Governor of Okinawa Prefecture, from 1972 to 1976.)	1 December 1968	14 May 1972	Okinawa Social Mass Party

== Bibliography ==
- Teraya, Eiichi. 沖縄行政機構変遷史 : 明治12年〜昭和59年. (1984)
