= Dobashi (disambiguation) =

Dobashi is a government-appointed official in Nagaland who serves as an interpreter, customary law expert and judicial assistant within the state's traditional and administrative system.

Dobashi may also refer to a Japanese surname (written: 土橋). Notable people with the surname include:

- Hiroyuki Dobashi (土橋 宏由樹; born 1977), Japanese footballer
- Katsuyuki Dobashi (土橋 勝征; born 1968), Japanese baseball player
- Masayuki Dobashi (土橋 正幸; 1935–2013), Japanese baseball player and manager
- Myron N. Dobashi (born 1943), United States Air Force general
- Shigeyuki Dobashi (土橋 茂之; born 1970), Japanese boxer

== See also ==
- Dobashi Station (disambiguation), multiple railway stations in Japan
- Dobhashi, Persianised register of the Bengali language
