= Soltz =

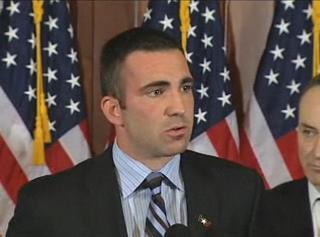
- Jon Soltz, American military official with the name

Origin
- Region of origin: Lithuania, Belarus

Soltz is a Lithuanian and Belarusian Jewish surname. It means "someone who lives by Sluch River".

Notable people with the surname include:

- Aaron Soltz (1872-1945), Soviet politician and lawyer
- David L. Soltz, American environmental biologist
- Jon Soltz, American military official
- Nathan Soltz, American politician
