= Minna Island, Tarama =

Island within Ryukyu Islands

Minna Island
Native name: 水納島
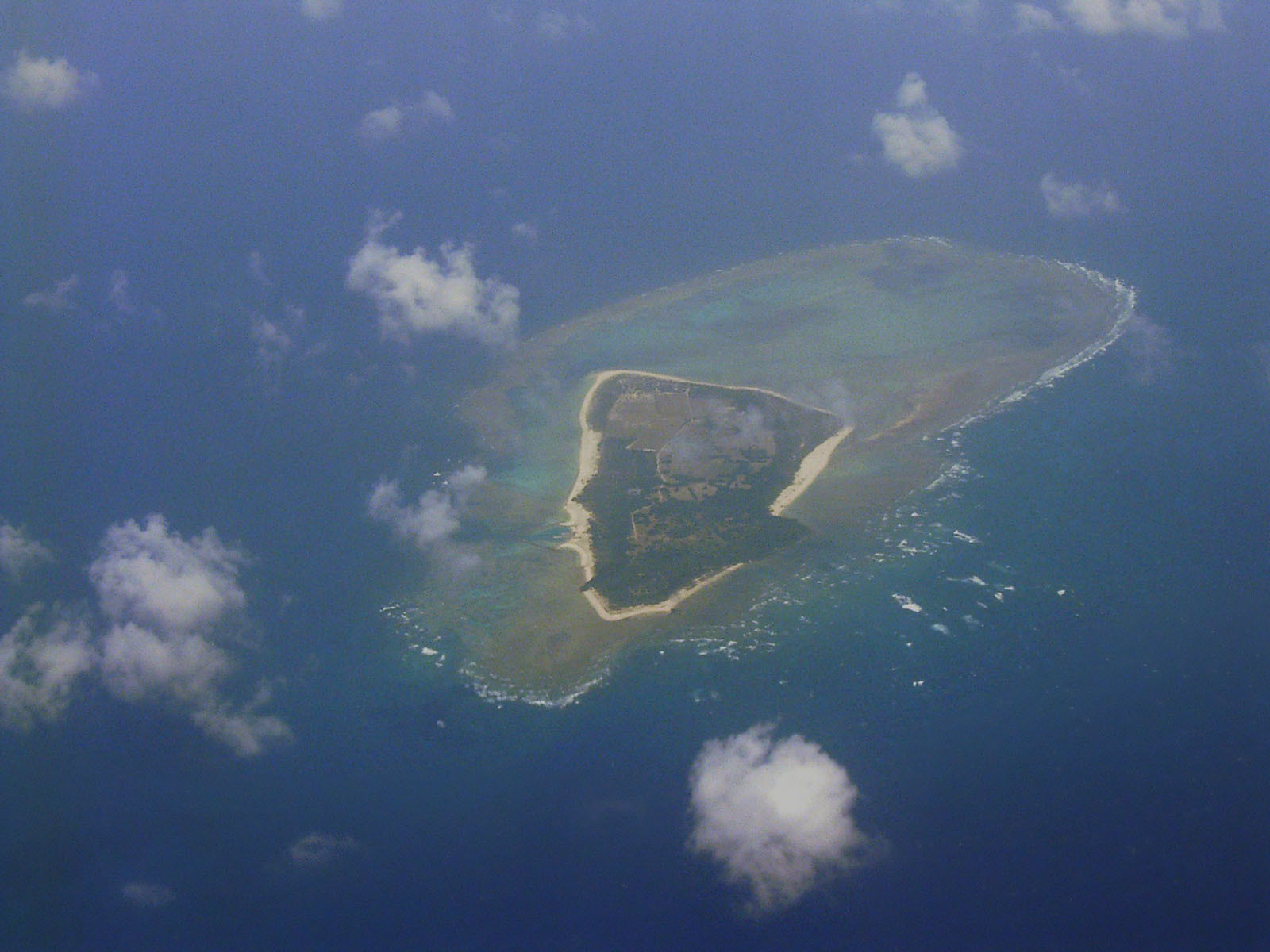
- Interactive map of Minna Island

Geography
- Coordinates: 24°45′17″N 124°41′42″E
- Archipelago: Miyako Islands
- Adjacent to: East China Sea
- Area: 2.16 km^{2} (0.83 sq mi)

Administration
- Japan
- Prefecture: Okinawa Prefecture

Demographics
- Population: 5 (2015 national census)

Minna Island (Miyako and Japanese: 水納島, romanized: Minnajima) is an island in the Miyako Islands in the jurisdiction of Tarama, Miyako District, Okinawa Prefecture, Japan.

== Geography ==
Minnajima is part of the Miyako Islands and is 8 km north of Tarama Island. The island is surrounded by an atoll, primarily spreading to the west, with the East China Sea to the north and the Pacific Ocean to the south.

== History ==
Minnajima was historically host to a fishing village, with the local population reaching more than 200 adults. Due to regular typhoon damage and water shortages, The majority of the residents of Minnajima were relocated to the Takano district of Hirara in 1961.

A lighthouse was built on the southeastern portion of the island, first lit in 1972. The light is 21m above sea level and is visible up to a distance of 12.0 nautical miles.

As of 2016, there are 5 residents who raise over 100 cattle on the island.

- 1734 – Hisashiya Asatoshi was executed, and his eldest son was exiled to Minna Island.
- 1771 – The Great Yaeyama Tsunami devastated the island.
- 1900 – A branch school was set up on the island.
- 1961 – A majority of the residents were relocated.
- 1978 – The branch school closed.
- 1983 – A fresh water supply facility was completed.
- 1989 – Submarine power transmission from Tarama to the island.
- 2011 – Tarama Prefectural Natural park is established around Tarama and Minna Island.

=== Historic Sites ===
- Sakishima Beacons National Historic Site.

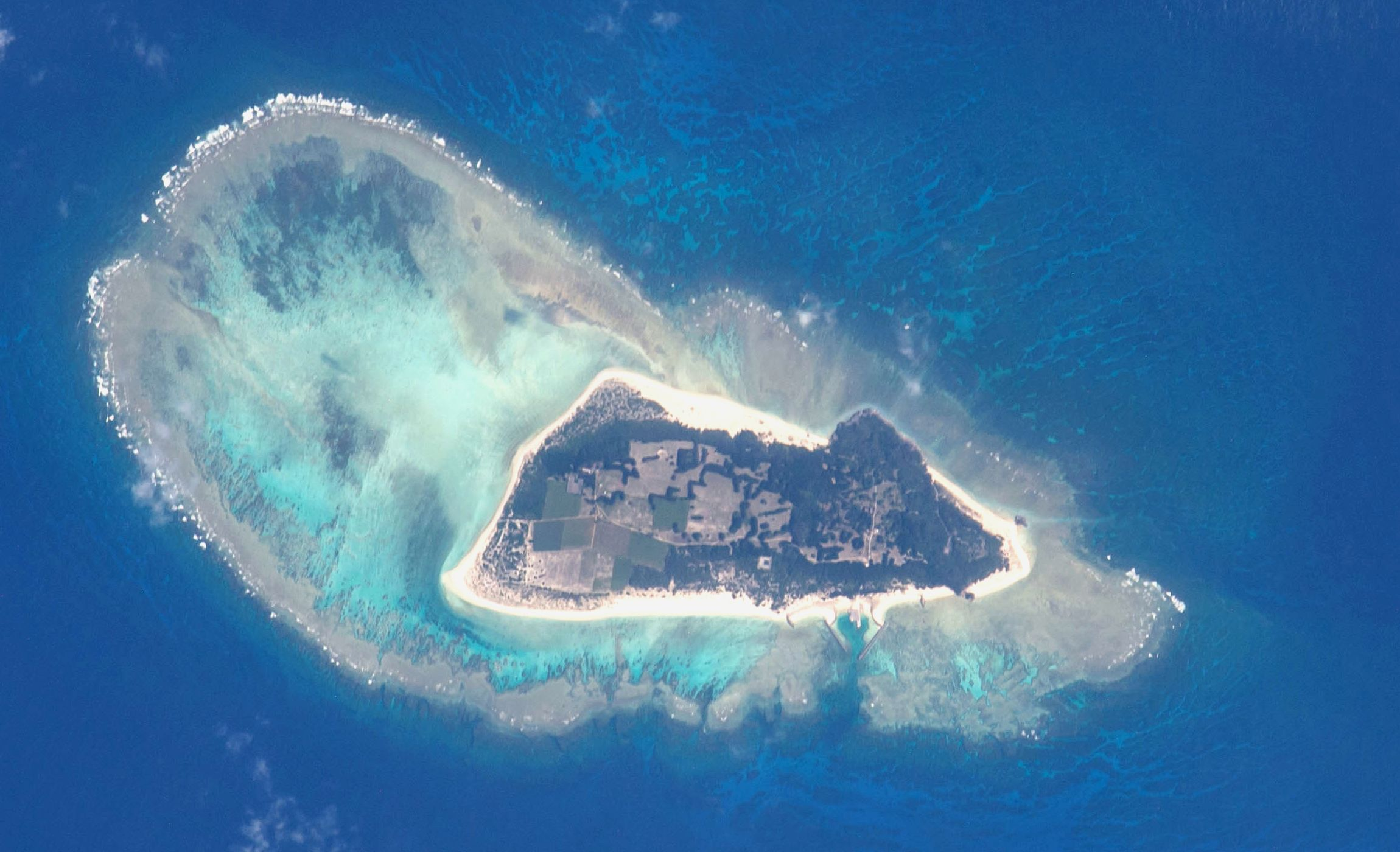
Minna Island from the International Space Station in 2015.

== Infrastructure ==
- Electricity is transmitted through submarine cables from a power station on Tarama Island.
- A combination of groundwater purification and rainwater collection is used to provide fresh water to the island.
- Telephone cables have been run to the island, and cellphone service through NTT Docomo is available over the entire island.
- Two cottages and multiple campsites are available for visitors, but food will have to be prepared in advance, as there are no shops on the island.
- A heliport was built next to the lighthouse, but is only used by the Japan Coast Guard in an emergency.
- Access to the island is provided by ship from Tarama Island.
