= Shelley Powers =

American author and web designer

- Education: Central Washington University (BA, BS)
- Occupations: Author, web developer, architect
- Known for: Burningbird, O'Reilly Media

Shelley Powers is an American author, web developer and technology architect. She works with and writes about open source, LAMP technologies and web service development, CSS/XHTML design, web graphics and the use of these technologies in the semantic web.

For her work as an author and her long-running tech weblog Burningbird, Powers was called "one of the more visible women in technology" by Virginia DeBolt of BlogHer in 2008. She has been an advocate for women in computing. She told the BlogHer interviewer, "Women are making great strides in every field of science and technology, except computers and engineering. Our numbers are decreasing every year -- a fact that should alarm not only women, but men."

== Personal life ==
In 2020, Powers moved from St. Louis to Savannah, Georgia. She graduated from Central Washington University with a B.A. in Industrial Psychology and a B.S. in Computer science.

== Career ==
In the late 1980s, while at Boeing, Powers began working with data and data interchange. At Boeing, she learned about the Product Data Exchange Specification (PDES). After this, she moved to Sierra Geophysics, a subsidiary of Halliburton, where she learned about POSC.

Powers's career as a computer book author began when she was working as a Powerbuilder developer in the 1990s and posted on help forums. An editor for Waite Group Press saw her posts and asked her to co-author a book on the software.

== Bibliography ==
- Learning Node (O'Reilly, 2012) ISBN 1-449-32307-3
- HTML5 Media (O'Reilly, 2011) ISBN 1-449-30445-1
- JavaScript Cookbook (O'Reilly, 2010) ISBN 978-0-596-80613-2
- Learning JavaScript, 2nd edition (O'Reilly, 2008) ISBN 0-596-52187-1
- Painting the Web (O'Reilly, 2008) ISBN 0-596-51509-X
- Adding Ajax (O'Reilly, 2007) ISBN 0-596-52936-8
- Practical RDF (O'Reilly, 2003) ISBN 0-596-00263-7
- Unix Power Tools (O'Reilly, 2002) ISBN 0-596-00330-7
- Essential Blogging (O'Reilly, 2002) ISBN 0-596-00388-9
- Developing ASP Components (O'Reilly, 2001) ISBN 1-56592-750-8
