= Stephen L. Nelson =

Stephen L. Nelson (born 1959) is the author of more than 160 books about using personal computers, including Quicken for Dummies, QuickBooks for Dummies, MBA's Guide to Microsoft Excel, and Excel Data Analysis for Dummies. The Wall Street Journal once called him the Louis L'Amour of computer books because at the time (December 2000), he had written more computer books than any other author.

Nelson has an undergraduate degree in accounting from Central Washington University, an MBA in finance from the University of Washington, and an MS in taxation from Golden Gate University.

A Seattle CPA, Nelson often writes about the small business and personal finance applications of computers. As an adjunct tax professor at Golden Gate University's graduate tax school, he also occasionally teaches their course, "Choice of Entity: S Corporations vs. Limited Liability Companies."

He also maintains a small business accounting web site including free pdf versions of half a dozen of his books, and two websites with do-it-yourself setup kits for forming limited liability companies and S corporations in the United States.
