= Miyako Subprefecture =

Former subprefecture of Okinawa, Japan

Coordinates: 24°47′30″N 125°17′34″E

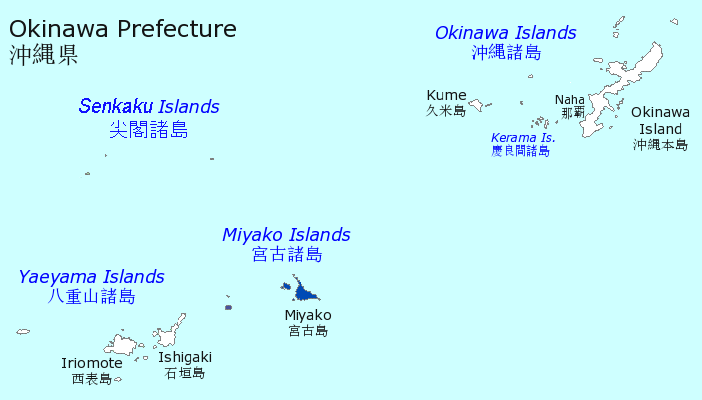
Miyako Subprefecture's location in Okinawa Prefecture

Miyako Subprefecture (宮古支庁, Miyako-shichō) was a subprefecture of Okinawa Prefecture, Japan. It was abolished in March 2009. Most of its functions were taken over by the Miyako Office of the prefecture.

It included the following cities and towns of Miyako Islands:

- Miyakojima (city on Miyakojima, Ikemajima, Ōgamijima, Kurimajima, Irabujima, and Shimojishima)
- Tarama (village on Taramajima and Minnajima), constituting Miyako District

== Offices ==
- Miyako Subprefecture: 1125 Hirara Nishizato, Miyakojima-shi, Okinawa-ken. 906-0012
