= Dobashi Station =

Dobashi Station may refer to:

- Dobashi Station (Ehime), a railway station on the Gunchū Line in Matsuyama, Ehime Prefecture, Japan
- Dobashi Station (Hiroshima), a tram stop of Hiroshima Electric Railway in Hiroshima, Hiroshima Prefecture, Japan
