= Myron Dobashi =

United States Air Force general

Myron N. Dobashi
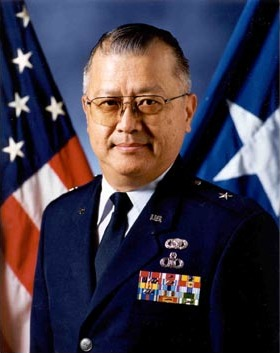
- Born: August 1, 1943 (age 83); Kauaʻi, Hawaii
- Military career
- Allegiance: United States of America
- Branch: United States Air Force
- Service years: 1965–2003
- Rank: Brigadier general

Myron N. Dobashi (born August 1, 1943) is a retired brigadier general in the National Guard of the United States and former commander of the Hawaii Air National Guard.

== Career ==
Dobashi joined the United States Air Force in 1965 and was stationed at Truax Air Force Base in Madison, Wisconsin, until 1967. From there he was deployed overseas to serve in the Vietnam War. He later joined the Hawaii Air National Guard in 1969. From 1996 to 1999, he held command of the 201st Combat Communications Group before being promoted to commander of the Hawaii Air National Guard from 1999 to 2003.

Awards he received include the Legion of Merit with oak leaf cluster, the Bronze Star Medal, the Meritorious Service Medal with oak leaf cluster, the Air Force Commendation Medal with oak leaf cluster, the Outstanding Unit Award with valor device and silver and bronze oak leaf cluster, the Combat Readiness Medal with silver oak leaf cluster and bronze oak leaf cluster, the National Defense Service Medal with oak leaf cluster, the Vietnam Service Medal with service star, the Humanitarian Service Medal, the Air Force Overseas Service Ribbon - Short Tour, the Air Force Longevity Service Award with silver oak leaf cluster and two bronze oak leaf clusters, the Small Arms Expert Marksmanship Ribbon, the Air Force Training Ribbon, the Vietnam Gallantry Cross, and the Vietnam Campaign Medal.

== Education ==
- B.A. (History), Central Washington State College
