= David L. Soltz =

David Lee Soltz is an American environmental biologist and the 18th President of Bloomsburg University of Pennsylvania.

Soltz studied as an undergraduate at University of California, Berkeley, and received his PhD in biology in 1974 from the University of California, Los Angeles, with a doctoral dissertation on variation in the life history and social organization of Nevada pupfish populations. After receiving his PhD, he joined the faculty of California State University at Los Angeles, eventually serving as Dean of its College of Natural and Social Sciences. He then served as Provost and senior vice president for academic affairs at Central Washington University in Ellensburg, Washington from 2001 to 2007. In November 2007, he was appointed President of Bloomsburg University of Pennsylvania and took up his post in January 2008.
