= Yaeyama Subprefecture =

Coordinates: 24°20′25″N 124°11′16″E

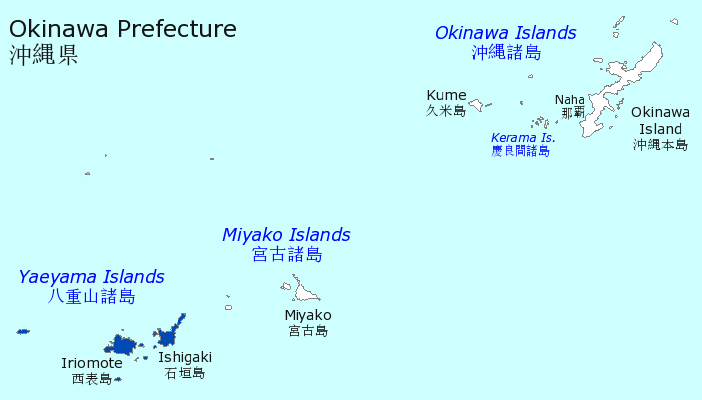
Yaeyama Subprefecture's location in Okinawa Prefecture

Yaeyama Subprefecture (八重山支庁, Yaeyama-shichō) was a subprefecture of Okinawa Prefecture, Japan. It was abolished in March 2009. Most of its functions were taken over by the Yaeyama Office of the prefecture.

It included the following cities and towns of Yaeyama and Senkaku Islands:

- Ishigaki (city on Ishigaki and Senkaku Islands)
- Taketomi (town on Iriomote, Taketomi, Kohama, Kuroshima, Hateruma, Hatoma, and others)
- Yonaguni (town on Yonaguni)

== Offices ==
- Yaeyama Subprefecture: 438-1 Maezato, Ishigaki-shi, Okinawa-ken. 907-0002
