= 1771 Great Yaeyama Tsunami =

1771 earthquake and tsunami in Japan

- Location within East China Sea
- Local date: April 24, 1771
- Local time: ~8 A.M.
- Magnitude: 7.4 M_{s}
- Epicenter: 24.0°N 124.3°E
- Areas affected: Ryūkyū Kingdom: Ryukyu Islands
- Tsunami: Yes
- Casualties: 13,486 deaths
- The Yaeyama Great Earthquake

The 1771 Great Yaeyama Tsunami (also called 明和の大津波, the Great Tsunami of Meiwa) was caused by the Yaeyama Great Earthquake at about 8 A.M. on April 24, 1771, south-southeast of Ishigaki Island, part of the former Ryūkyū Kingdom and now part of present-day Okinawa, Japan. According to records, 8,439 people were killed on Ishigaki Island and 2,548 on Miyako Island.

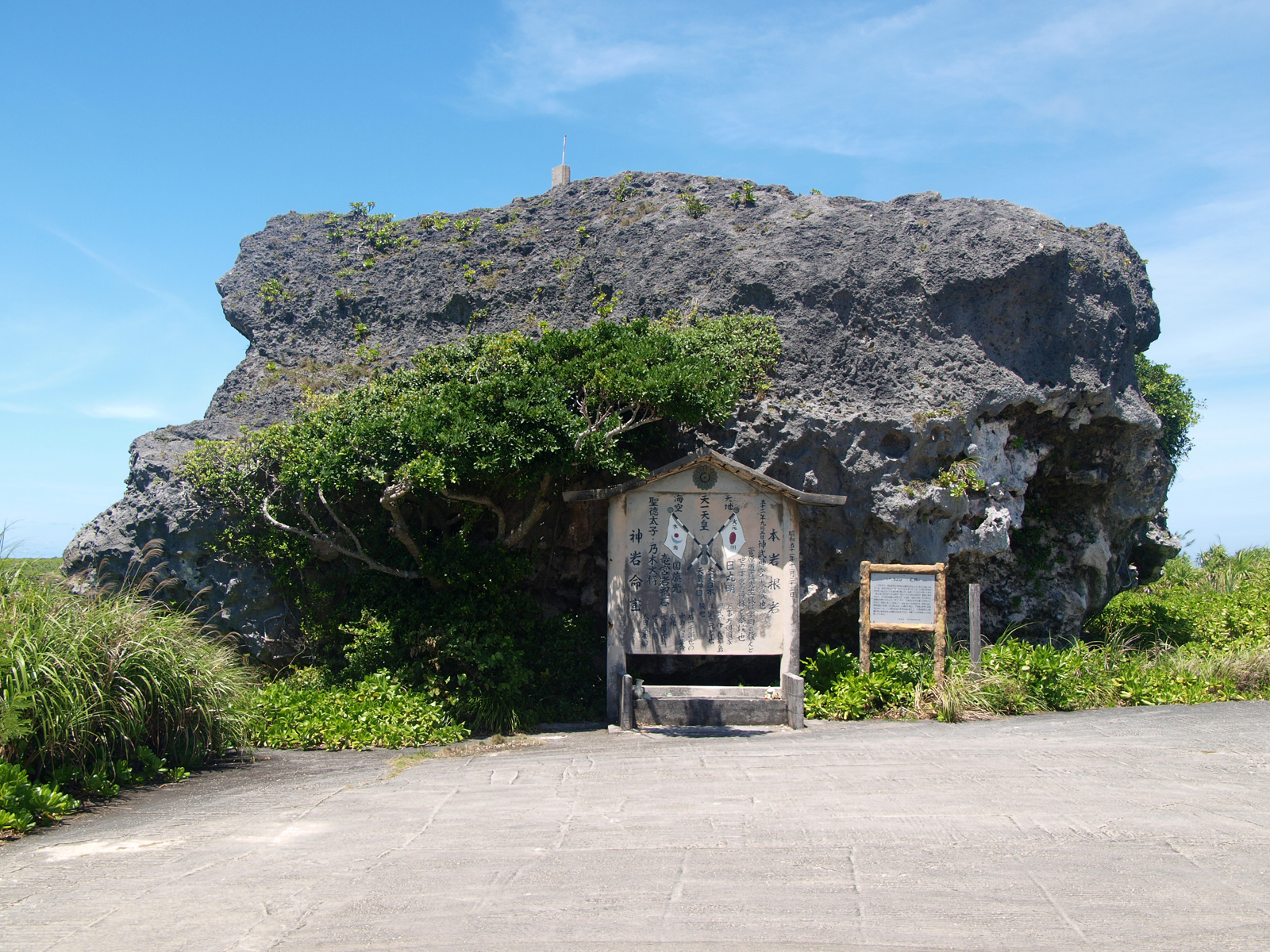
Obi Rock on Shimoji island, Miyakojima. The rock is said to have been left by the tsunami.

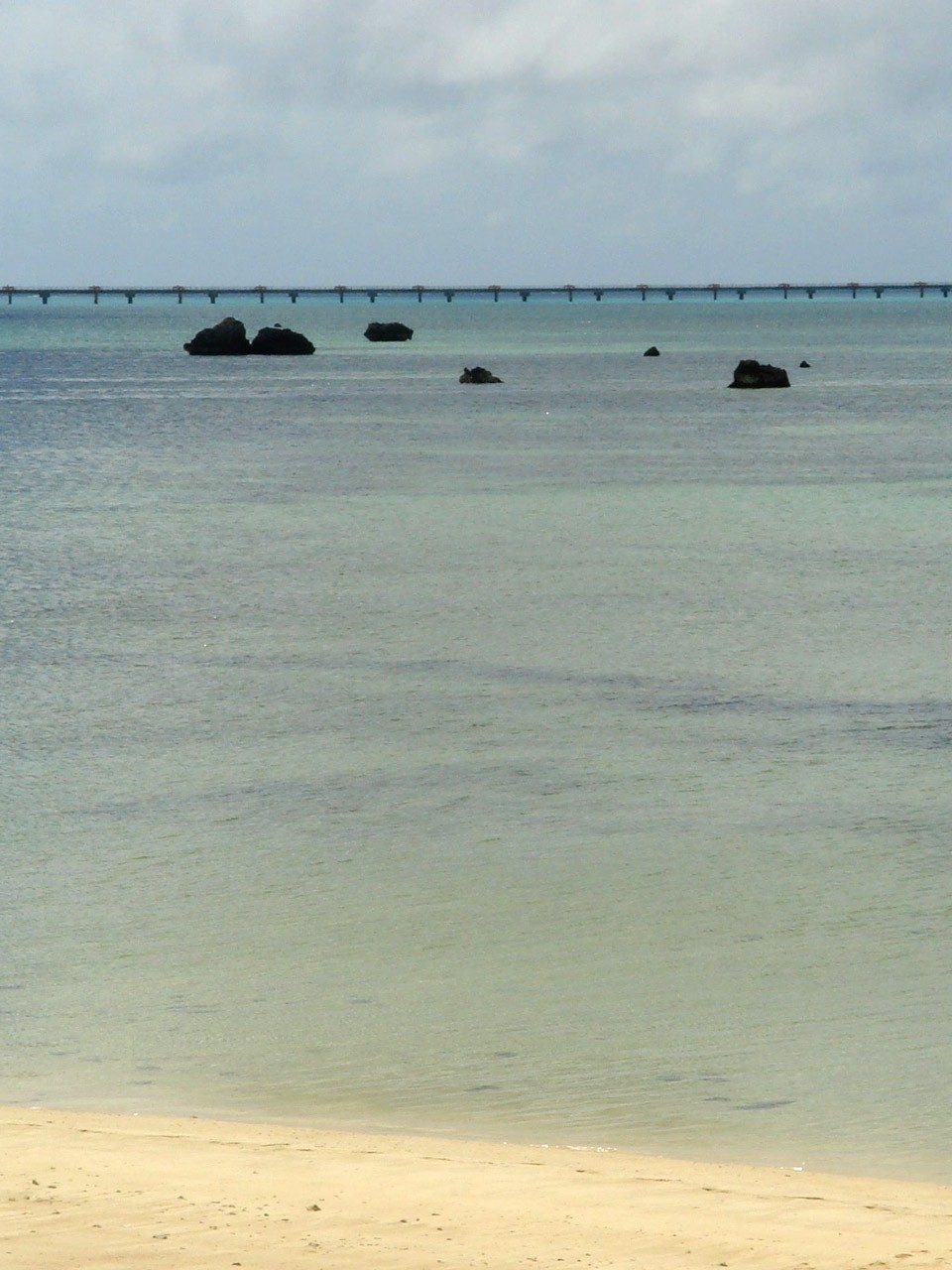
Sawada beach on Shimoji island. The rocks are believed to be remnants of the tsunami

== Earthquake analysis ==
According to the Japanese government publication Rika-Nenpyō (理科年表) or Chronological Scientific Tables, the epicenter was 40 kilometres (25 mi) south-southeast of Ishigaki Island with a magnitude of 7.4. According to the Mamoru Nakamura Laboratory, University of the Ryukyus, the earthquake was due to the activity of the fault east of Ishigaki and it is estimated that the magnitude was 7.5. Further simulation led to the activity of faults in the Ryukyu oceanic trench and the magnitude was 8.0. Also, there is a hypothesis that claims the magnitude was 8.5. The depth was 6 kilometres (3.7 mi). This trench lies between the Philippine Sea plate and the Eurasian plate. The disparity in the amount of recorded shaking (maximum 4 JMA) and the size of the tsunami has led to the interpretation of this event as a tsunami earthquake.

== Damage ==
=== Earthquake ===
It is considered that the earthquake registered an intensity of 4 (on the Japanese scale) in the Yaeyama Islands, and the damage by the earthquake itself was not as serious as the ensuing tsunami.

=== Tsunami ===
The dead and missing amounted to 12,000 people, and more than 2,000 houses were destroyed on Ishigaki and Miyakojima. It has been estimated local agriculture was severely damaged because of sea water invasion and the population decreased to about one third of what it was before the earthquake. On Ishigaki island, the run-up was first estimated around 40 to 80 meters high from historical documents. However, taking into account the rough precision of the measuring instruments at this time and considering geomorphological parameters, the maximum run-up has been re-estimated to ~30m.

Following the tsunami, the damage it caused was such that it led to a famine that lasted for 80 years.

== Boulders ==
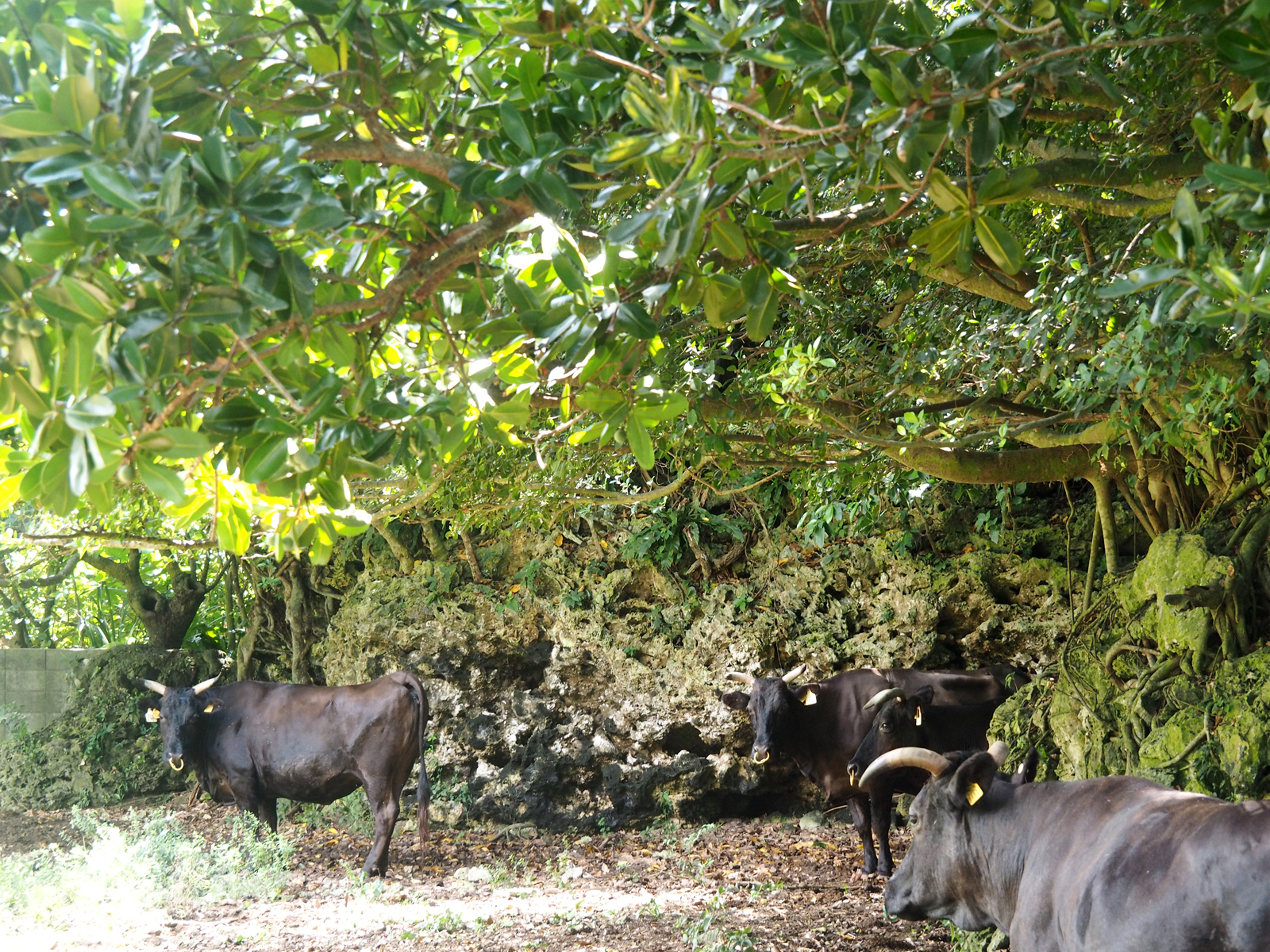
Ishigaki takakoruse ishi, boulder dragged on land by the tsunami. It was moved approximately on 55m.

There are many huge boulders on the coasts of the Yaeyema and Miyako islands that are believed to have been deposited by tsunamis. There was a legend that an islet disappeared, but this has never been verified. This set of rocks is called the Ishigaki East Coast Tsunami Rocks. Among them, Yasura-ufukane, Amatariya–Suuari and Taka-koru sishi have been dragged by the 1771 Meiwa tsunami.

== See also ==
- 1741 eruption of Oshima–Ōshima and the Kampo tsunami
- 1792 Unzen earthquake and tsunami
- List of earthquakes in Japan
- List of historical earthquakes
- List of tsunamis
